= List of SNCF stations in Bourgogne-Franche-Comté =

This article contains a list of current SNCF railway stations in the Bourgogne-Franche-Comté region of France, sorted by department.

== Côte-d'Or (21) ==
- Aiserey
- Auxonne
- Beaune
- Blaisy-Bas
- Brazey-en-Plaine
- Bretigny-Norges
- Chaugey
- Collonges
- Corgoloin
- Dijon-Porte-Neuve
- Dijon-Ville
- Gemeaux
- Genlis
- Gevrey-Chambertin
- Is-sur-Tille
- Lantenay
- Les Laumes
- Liernais
- Longecourt
- Mâlain
- Manlay
- Meursault
- Montbard
- Neuilly-lès-Dijon
- Nuits-Saint-Georges
- Ouges
- Pagny
- La Roche-en-Brenil
- Ruffey
- Saint-Jean-de-Losne
- Saint-Julien-Clenary
- Santenay-les-Bains
- Saulieu
- Saulon
- Seurre
- Sincey-lès-Rouvray
- Thenissey
- Velars
- Verrey
- Villers-les-Pots
- Vougeot-Gilly-lès-Cîteaux

== Doubs (25) ==
- Arc-et-Senans
- Avoudrey
- Baume-les-Dames
- Besançon Franche-Comté TGV
- Besançon-Mouillère
- Besançon-Viotte
- Boujailles
- Byans
- Clerval
- Colombier-Fontaine
- Dannemarie-Velesmes
- Deluz
- École-Valentin
- Étalans
- Franois
- Frasne
- Gilley
- L'Hôpital-du-Grosbois
- L'Isle-sur-le-Doubs
- Labergement-Sainte-Marie
- Laissey
- Liesle
- Mamirolle
- Montbéliard
- Montferrand-Thoraise
- Morre
- Morteau
- Novillars
- Pontarlier
- La Rivière
- Roche-lez-Beaupré
- Sainte-Colombe
- Saint-Vit
- Saône
- Torpes-Boussières
- Le Valdahon
- Voujeaucourt

== Haute-Saône (70) ==
- Aillevillers
- Champagney
- Héricourt
- Lure
- Luxeuil-les-Bains
- Ronchamp
- Vesoul

== Jura (39) ==
- Andelot
- Arbois
- Champagnole
- Champagnole-Paul-Émile-Victor
- La Chaumusse-Fort-du-Plasne
- La Chaux-des-Crotenay
- Cousance
- Dole-Ville
- Domblans-Voiteur
- Lons-le-Saunier
- Montbarrey
- Morbier
- Morez
- Mouchard
- Orchamps
- Poligny
- Ranchot
- Saint-Amour
- Saint-Claude
- Saint-Laurent-en-Grandvaux
- Saint-Lothain

== Nièvre (58) ==
- Béard
- Cercy-la-Tour
- Chantenay-Saint-Imbert
- La Charité
- Clamecy
- Corbigny
- Cosne-sur-Loire
- Decize
- Flez-Cuzy-Tannay
- Fourchambault
- Garchizy
- Imphy
- Luzy
- La Marche
- Mesves-Bulcy
- Nevers
- Nevers-le-Banlay
- Nevers-les-Perrières
- Pougues-les-Eaux
- Pouilly-sur-Loire
- Saincaize
- Saint-Pierre-le-Moûtier
- Tracy-Sancerre
- Tronsanges
- Vauzelles

== Saône-et-Loire (71) ==
- Autun
- Blanzy
- Brion-Laizy
- Broye
- Chagny
- Chalon-sur-Saône
- Chauffailles
- Cheilly-lès-Maranges
- Ciry-le-Noble
- La Clayette-Baudemont
- Cordesse-Igornay
- Crêches-sur-Saône
- Le Creusot
- Le Creusot TGV
- Digoin
- Étang-sur-Arroux
- Fleurville-Pont-de-Vaux
- Fontaines-Mercurey
- Galuzot
- Génelard
- Gilly-sur-Loire
- Louhans
- Mâcon-Loché TGV
- Mâcon-Ville
- Marmagne-sous-Creusot
- Mervans
- Mesvres
- Montceau-les-Mines
- Montchanin
- Navilly
- Paray-le-Monial
- Pontanevaux
- Romanèche-Thorins
- Rully
- Saint-Agnan
- Saint-Léger-sur-Dheune
- Saint-Symphorien-de-Marmagne
- Sennecey-le-Grand
- Senozan
- Tournus

== Territoire de Belfort (90) ==
- Bas-Évette
- Belfort
- Belfort – Montbéliard TGV
- Chèvremont
- Danjoutin
- Delle
- Petit-Croix
- Trois-Chênes

== Yonne (89) ==
- Arcy-sur-Cure
- Augy-Vaux
- Auxerre-Saint-Gervais
- Avallon
- Champigny-sur-Yonne
- Champs-Saint-Bris
- Châtel-Censoir
- Chemilly-Appoigny
- Coulanges-sur-Yonne
- Cravant-Bazarnes
- Étigny-Véron
- Joigny
- Laroche-Migennes
- Lucy-sur-Cure-Bessy
- Mailly-la-Ville
- Monéteau-Gurgy
- Nuits-sous-Ravières
- Pont-sur-Yonne
- Saint-Florentin-Vergigny
- Saint-Julien-du-Sault
- Sens
- Sermizelles-Vézelay
- Tonnerre
- Vermenton
- Villeneuve-la-Guyard
- Villeneuve-sur-Yonne
- Vincelles
- Voutenay

== See also ==
- SNCF
- List of SNCF stations for SNCF stations in other regions
