= TER Bourgogne =

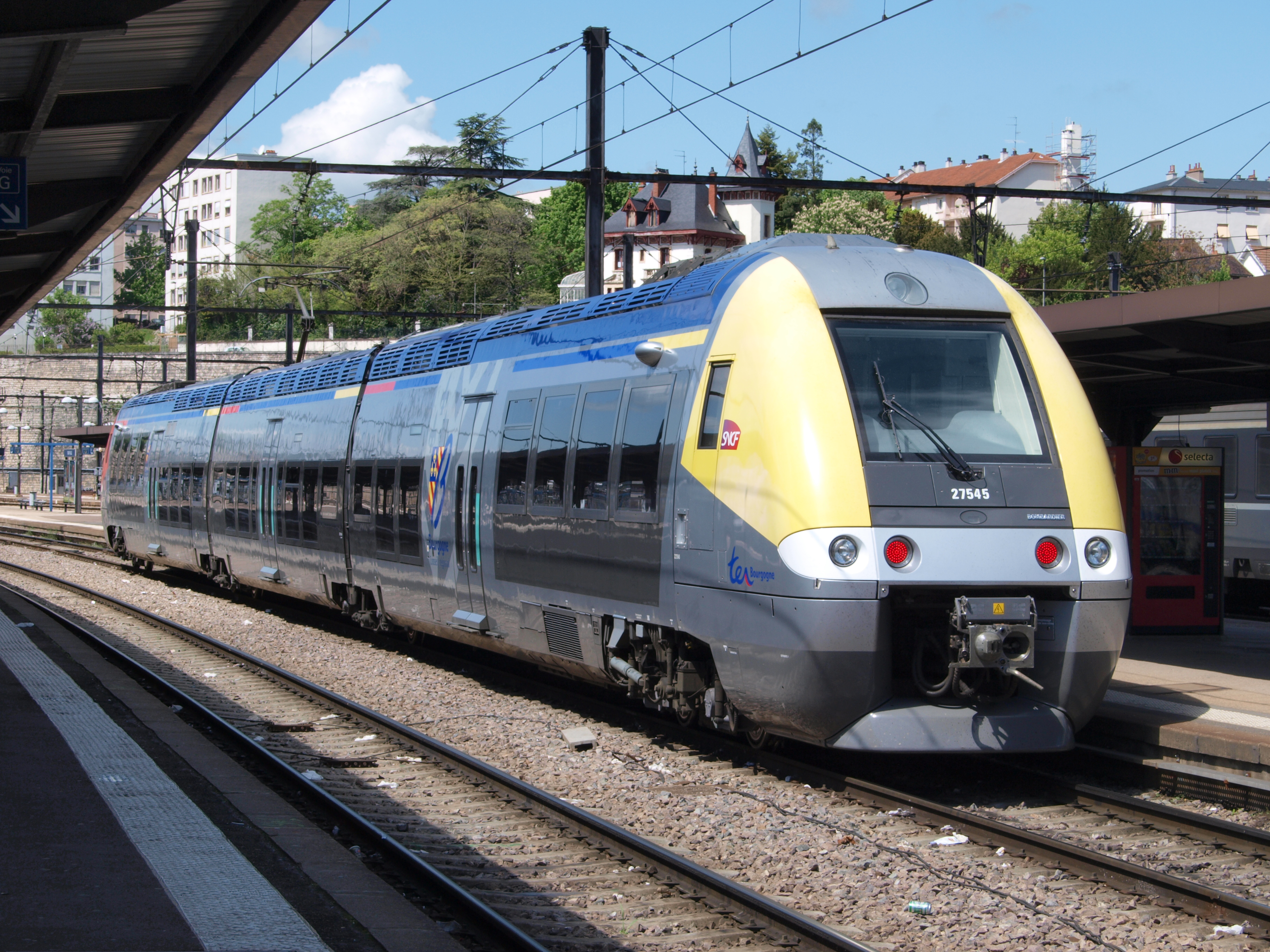
- Z 27500 in Dijon-Ville station, in TER Bourgogne branding.

Overview
- Website: http://www.sncf.com/en/trains/ter

Technical
- Track gauge: 1,435 mm (4 ft 8 1/2 in) standard gauge

TER Bourgogne was the regional rail network serving the Burgundy region of France. In 2017 it was merged into the new TER Bourgogne-Franche-Comté.

== Network ==
=== Rail ===
Line	Route	Frequency	Notes
1	Dijon ... Chalon-sur-Saône ... Mâcon-Ville ... Villefranche-sur-Saône ... Lyon-Part-Dieu		express service
2	Montchanin ... Paray-le-Monial ... Moulins-sur-Allier		
3	Dijon ... Beaune ... Montchanin ... Étang-sur-Arroux ... Cercy ... Nevers		
4	Dijon – Montchanin – Etang – Autun		
5	Chalon-sur-Saône ... Montchanin		
6	Nevers ... Moulins-sur-Allier ... Paray-le-Monial ... Lamure-sur-Azergues ... Lozanne ... Saint-Germain-au-Mont-d'Or ... Lyon-Perrache		
7	Nevers – Cosne – Paris-Bercy		
8	Nevers – Moulins – Clermont		
9	Dijon ... Louhans – Saint-Amour – Bourg-en-Bresse		
10	Dijon ... Is-sur-Tille		
11	Dijon ... Montbard ... Laroche-Migennes ... Auxerre		
12	Dijon ↔ Les Laumes-Alésia ↔ Montbard ↔ Tonnerre ↔ Laroche-Migennes ↔ Sens ↔ Paris-Bercy		
14	Corbigny ... Clamecy ... Cravant-Bazarnes ... Auxerre – Laroche-Migennes ... Sens – Paris-Bercy branch line: Avallon ... Cravant-Bazarnes		
15	Paris-Bercy – Sens ↔ Laroche-Migennes ↔ Auxerre branch line: Paris-Lyon – Melun ↔ Moret-Véneux-les-Sablons ↔ Montereau ↔ Sens		
† Not all trains call at this station

=== Road ===
- 13 Autun – Avallon
- 16 Autun – Chagny
- 17 Châtillon-sur-Seine – Montbard
- 18 Clamecy – Avallon – Montbard

== Rolling stock ==
- SNCF Class Z 5600
- SNCF Class Z 5300

== See also ==
- SNCF
- Transport express régional
- Réseau Ferré de France
- List of SNCF stations in Burgundy
- Burgundy
