= Collonges station =

Railway station in Collonges-lès-Premières, France

Collonges
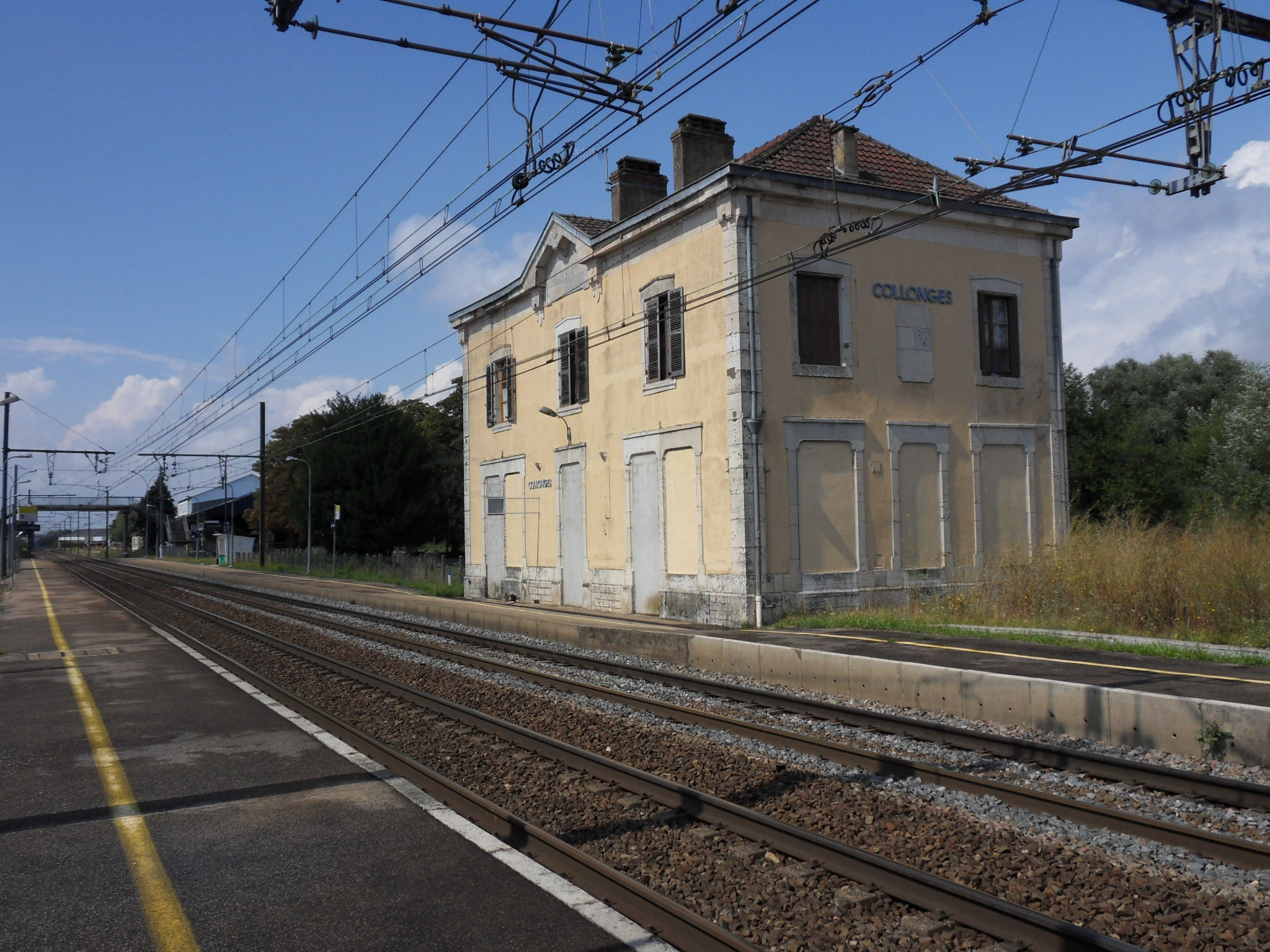
- The station in 2013

General information
- Location: Collonges-lès-Premières; France
- Coordinates: 47°13′17″N 5°15′55″E
- Owner: SNCF
- Lines: Dijon–Vallorbe line; LGV Rhin-Rhône
- Distance: 336.9 km (209.3 mi) from Paris-Lyon
- Train operators: SNCF

Other information
- Station code: 87713321

Passengers
- 2018: 26,571

Services
| Preceding station | TER Bourgogne-Franche-Comté | Following station |
|---|---|---|
| Genlis towards Dijon | TER | Villers-les-Pots towards Besançon |
Location

Collonges station (French: Gare de Collonges) is a railway station in the commune of Collonges-lès-Premières, in the French department of Côte-d'Or, in the Bourgogne-Franche-Comté region. It is an intermediate stop on the Dijon–Vallorbe line of SNCF. The high-speed LGV Rhin-Rhône to Besançon diverges east of the station.

== Services ==
The following services stop at Collonges:

- TER Bourgogne-Franche-Comté: regional service between Dijon-Ville and Besançon-Viotte.
