= Collonges =

Collonges is the name of several places:

== France ==
Collonges is the name or part of the name of several communes in France:

- Collonges, in the Ain département
- Collonges-au-Mont-d'Or, in the Rhône département
- Collonges-la-Rouge, in the Corrèze département
- Collonges-lès-Bévy, in the Côte-d'Or département
- Collonges-lès-Premières, in the Côte-d'Or département
- Collonges-sous-Salève, in the Haute-Savoie département

== Switzerland ==
- Collonges, in the canton of Valais

== See also ==
- Collonge (disambiguation)
