= École-Valentin =

- Commune
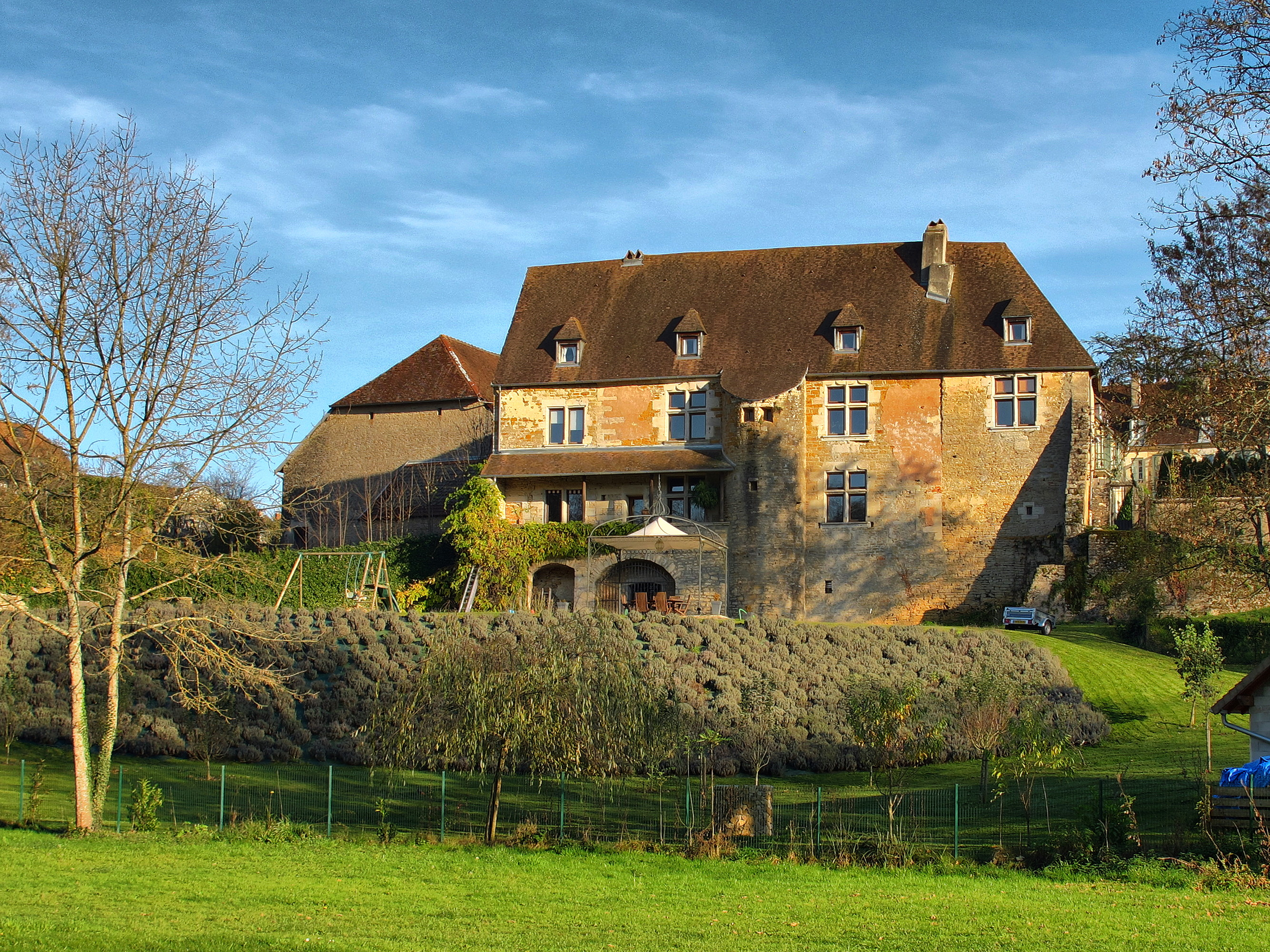
- École castle
- Location of École-Valentin
- Location within France Location within Bourgogne-Franche-Comté
- Coordinates: 47°16′23″N 5°59′07″E
- Country: France
- Region: Bourgogne-Franche-Comté
- Department: Doubs
- Arrondissement: Besançon
- Canton: Besançon-2
- Intercommunality: Grand Besançon Métropole

Government
  - Mayor (2020–2026): Yves Guyen
- Area^{1}: 3.22 km^{2} (1.24 sq mi)
- Highest elevation: 383 m (1,257 ft)
- Lowest elevation: 283 m (928 ft)
- Population (2023): 2,579
  - Density: 801/km^{2} (2,070/sq mi)
- Time zone: UTC+01:00 (CET)
  - Summer (DST): UTC+02:00 (CEST)
- INSEE/Postal code: 25212 /25480
- ^{1} French Land Register data, which excludes lakes, ponds, glaciers > 1 km^{2} (0.386 sq mi or 247 acres) and river estuaries.

École-Valentin is a commune in the Doubs department in the Bourgogne-Franche-Comté region in eastern France.

== Population ==
Historical population
| Year | Pop. | ±% p.a. |
|---|---|---|
| 1968 | 629 | — |
| 1975 | 1,093 | +8.21% |
| 1982 | 1,240 | +1.82% |
| 1990 | 1,860 | +5.20% |
| 1999 | 2,153 | +1.64% |
| 2007 | 2,319 | +0.93% |
| 2012 | 2,334 | +0.13% |
| 2017 | 2,609 | +2.25% |
| 2023 | 2,579 | −0.19% |
Source: INSEE

== Geography ==
The town, located north of Besançon, is crossed by the National Road 57. It is part of the Besançon urban area. The toll of the "Besançon North" exit of the A36 motorway is located in the village of Ecole-Valentin. École-Valentin station has rail connections with Besançon and the TGV station Besançon Franche-Comté. A major shopping area is located in the town of École-Valentin (as well as the neighboring towns of Miserey-Salines and Châtillon-le-Duc).

== Transport ==
- Gare d'École-Valentin

== Sights ==
- Fountain below the village, called St. George fountain, dating from 1630, located on the ancient Roman paved road linking Besançon Vesoul, where the animals could drink.
- Priory
- Church of St. George: 1892/83
- Castle built from 1557 to 1559 by the Commander of the Order of the Hospital of the Holy Spirit, Claude Buffet.

== International relations ==
It is twinned with Rathcoole in County Dublin, Ireland.

== See also ==
- Communes of the Doubs department
