= Collonges-et-Premières =

- Commune
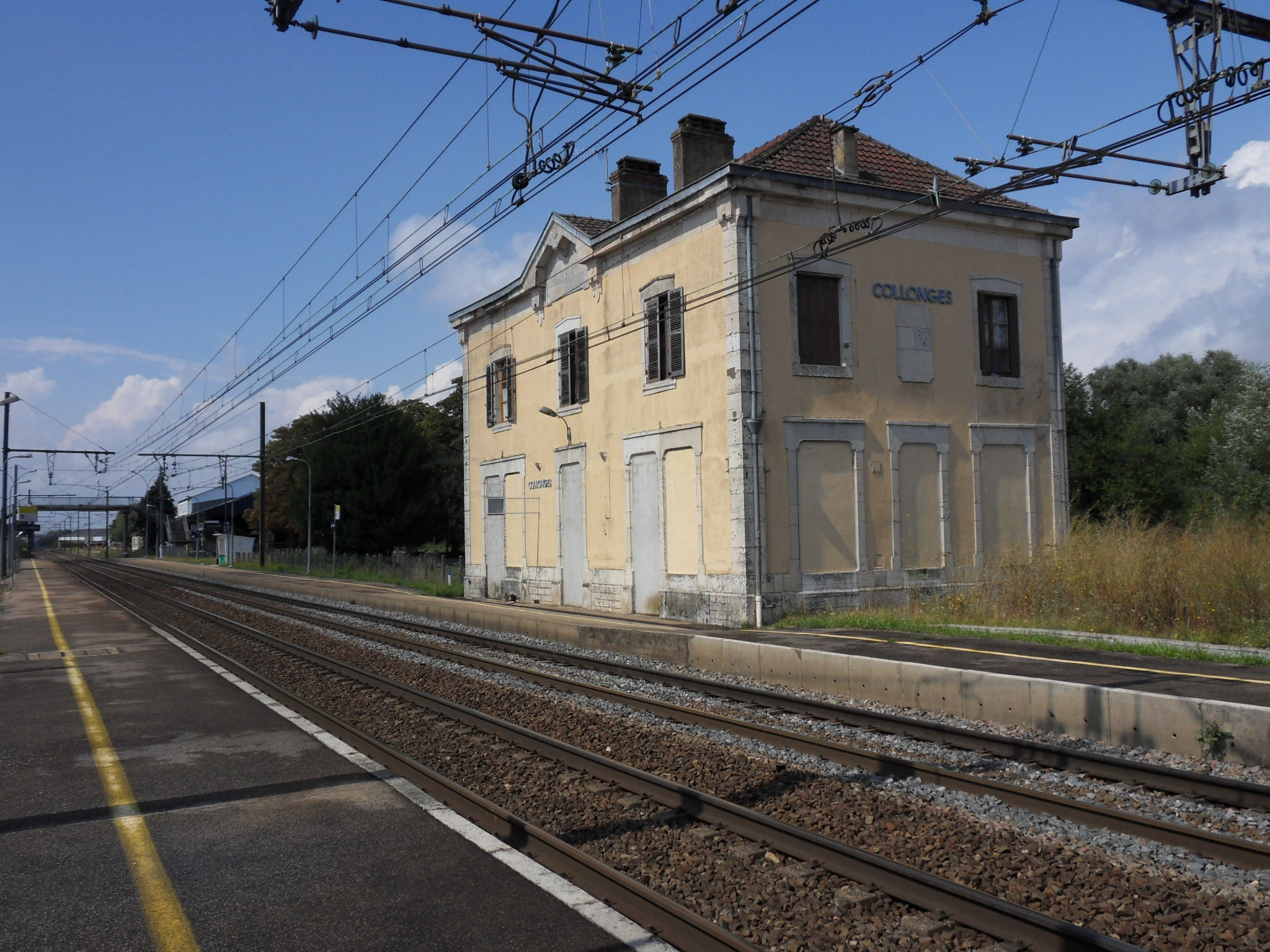
- Train station

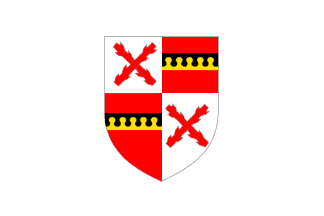
- Flag
- Location of Collonges-et-Premières
- Location within France Location within Bourgogne-Franche-Comté
- Coordinates: 47°13′32″N 5°16′09″E
- Country: France
- Region: Bourgogne-Franche-Comté
- Department: Côte-d'Or
- Arrondissement: Dijon
- Canton: Genlis
- Intercommunality: Plaine Dijonnaise

Government
  - Mayor (2022–2026): Vincent Crouzier
- Area^{1}: 12.56 km^{2} (4.85 sq mi)
- Highest elevation: 227 m (745 ft)
- Lowest elevation: 192 m (630 ft)
- Population (2023): 1,067
  - Density: 84.95/km^{2} (220.0/sq mi)
- Time zone: UTC+01:00 (CET)
  - Summer (DST): UTC+02:00 (CEST)
- INSEE/Postal code: 21183 /21110
- ^{1} French Land Register data, which excludes lakes, ponds, glaciers > 1 km^{2} (0.386 sq mi or 247 acres) and river estuaries.

Collonges-et-Premières (French pronunciation: [kɔlɔ̃ʒ e pʁəmjɛʁ]) is a commune in the Côte-d'Or department in eastern France. It is the result of the merger, on 28 February 2019, of the communes of Collonges-lès-Premières and Premières. Collonges station has rail connections to Dijon, Dole and Besançon.

== Population ==
Populations of the area corresponding with the commune of Collonges-et-Premières at 1 January 2025.

Historical population
Year	Pop.	±% p.a.
1968	425	—
1975	390	−1.22%
1982	538	+4.70%
1990	775	+4.67%
1999	788	+0.19%
2007	877	+1.35%
2012	922	+1.01%
2017	1,037	+2.38%
2023	1,067	+0.48%
Source: INSEE

== See also ==
- Communes of the Côte-d'Or department
