= Dijon-Porte-Neuve station =

French train station

Dijon Porte-Neuve
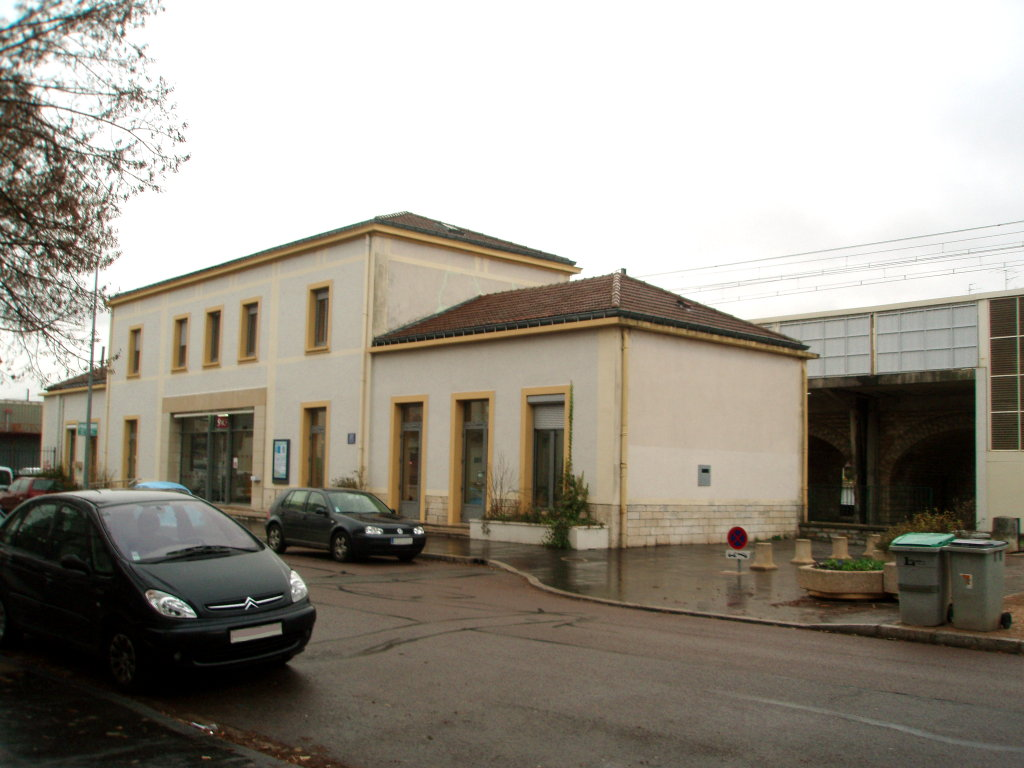
- Passengers building, city side (December 2008)

General information
- Location: 2 avenue Junot; 21000 Dijon; France
- Coordinates: 47.32308691°N 5.0551604°E
- Line: Dijon-Is-sur-Tille railway
- Tracks: 2

Other information
- Station code: 87713008

History
- Opened: 1870

Services
Preceding station	TER Bourgogne-Franche-Comté	Following station
Ruffey towards Is-sur-Tille	TER	Dijon-Ville Terminus
Preceding station	TER Grand Est	Following station
Is-sur-Tille towards Paris-Est	C04	Dijon-Ville Terminus
Location

Dijon-Porte-Neuve station (called Gare de Dijon-Porte-Neuve in France) is a French train station located at Junot Avenue in Dijon. It is in the Côte-d'Or department, within France's Bourgogne-Franche-Comté region. Gare de Dijon-Porte-Neuve is the secondary station for the city of Dijon, with the primary station being Gare de Dijon-Ville. TER (Transport express régional) trains take six minutes to go from one station to the other, crossing the city. Gare de Dijon-Porte-Neuve is an SNCF (Société Nationale des Chemins de fer Français) train station, served by TER Bourgogne-Franche-Comté trains.

== Location ==
Gare de Dijon-Porte-Neuve is located at kilometre post 321.935 on the "Dijon-Ville – Is-sur-Tille Line". This situates it between the Dijon-Ville and the Ruffey-lès-Echirey stations. Gare de Dijon-Porte-Neuve is at an altitude of 243 metres (797 ft), whereas the altitude of Dijon's main train station, Dijon-ville, is 247.48 metres (811.9 ft). The Gare de Dijon-Porte-Neuve passenger station is located next to its freight station, which extends north toward the Toison d'Or neighborhood of Dijon.

== History ==
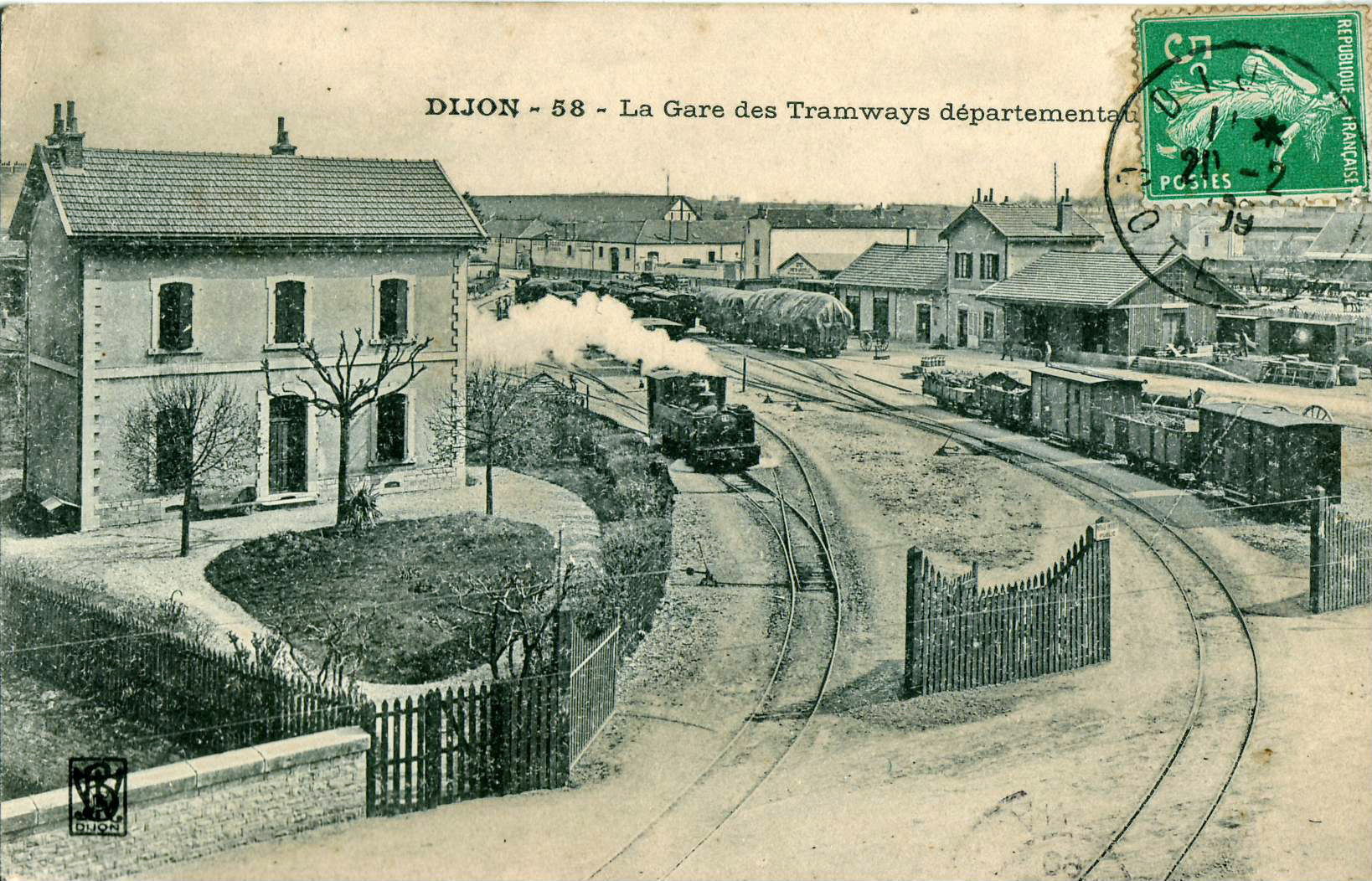
Gare de Dijon-Porte-Neuve, next to the Departmental Railways of the Côte-d'Or Station (circa 1908)

The French railway company Chemins de fer de Paris à Lyon et à la Méditerranée (PLM) was awarded a concession in 1863 to build a rail line from Dijon to Langres, and from there to France's border with Belgium. The large existing PLM train station was judged as not suitable for the new line and a site to the east of the city was chosen instead. Gare de Dijon-Porte-Neuve opened in 1870, after the beginning of the Franco-Prussian War.

The new station was located adjacent to the existing station of the Departmental Railways of the Côte-d'Or, a secondary (not part of France's national railway network) narrow gauge railway servicing the following lines: Meuilley — Dijon, Dijon — Champlitte, and Dijon — Chatillon-sur-Seine. The last of these secondary lines would eventually close in 1948.

For the LGV Rhin-Rhône Project, which had its first branch open on 11 December 2011, the Dijon government will expand and modernize Gare de Dijon-Porte-Neuve. In a related development, the train and bus station in the town center underwent a reorganization in 2008.

== Passenger and freight service ==
Gare de Dijon-Porte-Neuve is an SNCF railway station building without a ticket window. It is equipped with a TER automated ticketing system and also has nearby parking for bicycles and other vehicles. The train platforms are situated on a concrete walkway, with stairways providing access. The station is served by TER Bourgogne-Franche-Comté trains on the line from the Dijon-Ville station to Is-sur-Tille. The station is also open for freight.

== TGV project ==
Due to the decision to increase the western branch of the LGV Rhin-Rhône to pass through Dijon, and the need for a new TGV station on this line, the current Gare de Dijon-Porte-Neuve will become Dijon's new TGV station, with an expected re-opening in 2025. Improvements to Dijon-Porte-Neuve have already included the creation of a tram station and a link to Gare de Dijon-Ville, using the Dijon Tramway, which began operation in September 2012.
