= Collonge =

Collonge may refer to:

== Places ==
France

- Collonge-en-Charollais, in the Saône-et-Loire department
- Collonge-la-Madeleine, in the Saône-et-Loire department

Switzerland

- Collonge-Bellerive, in the canton of Geneva

== See also ==
- Collonges (disambiguation)
