= Vesoul station =

Railway station in Vesoul, France

Coordinates: 47°37′03″N 6°09′06″E

Vesoul station (French: Gare de Vesoul) is the railway station serving the commune of Vesoul, in the Haute-Saône department of eastern France.

== Services ==
The station is served by regional trains towards Lure, Belfort, Culmont-Chalindrey and Paris.

Preceding station	TER Bourgogne-Franche-Comté	Following station
Terminus	TER	Lure towards Belfort
Preceding station	TER Grand Est	Following station
Culmont–Chalindrey towards Paris-Est	C04	Lure towards Mulhouse

Views of the passenger building

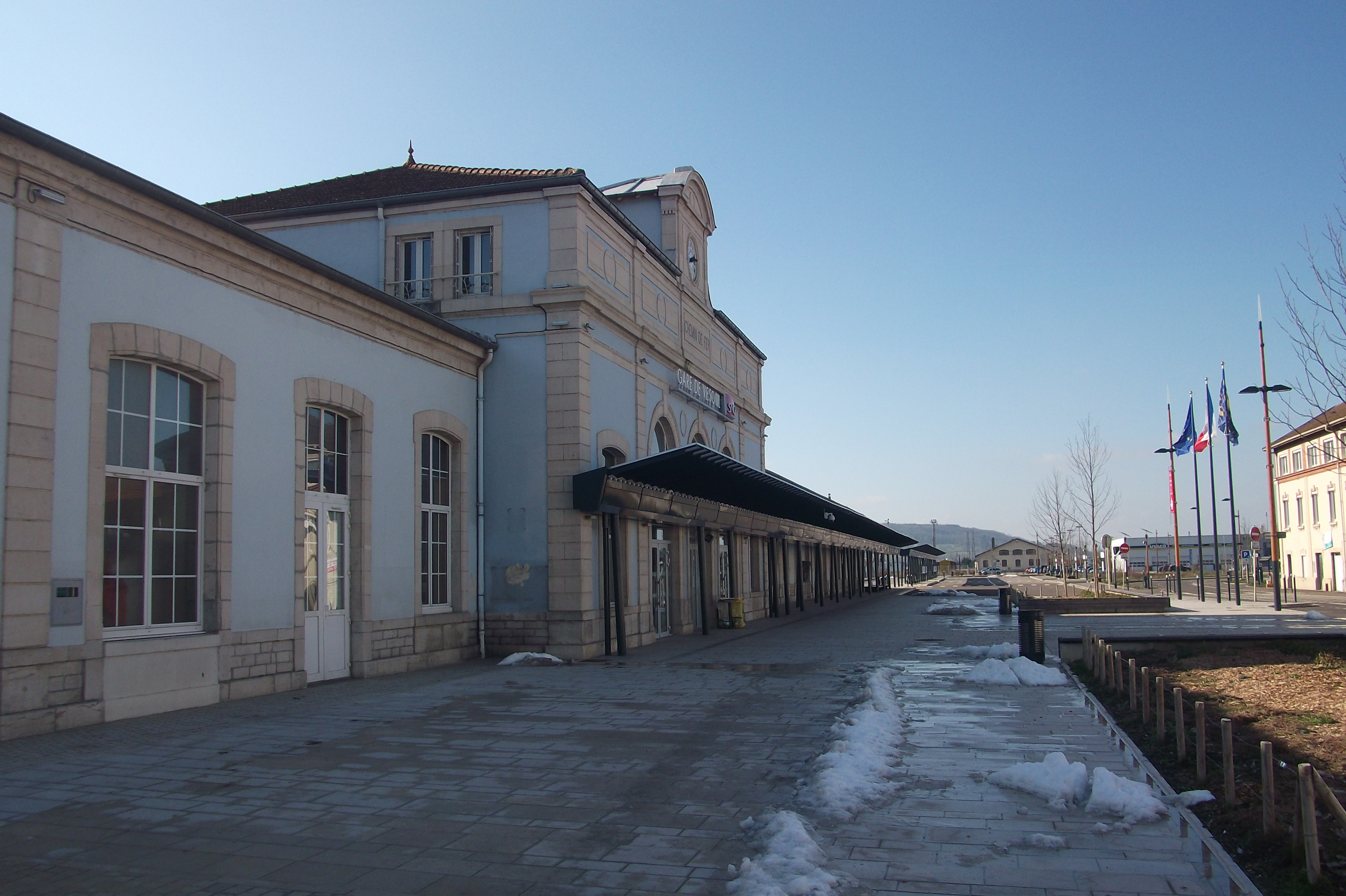

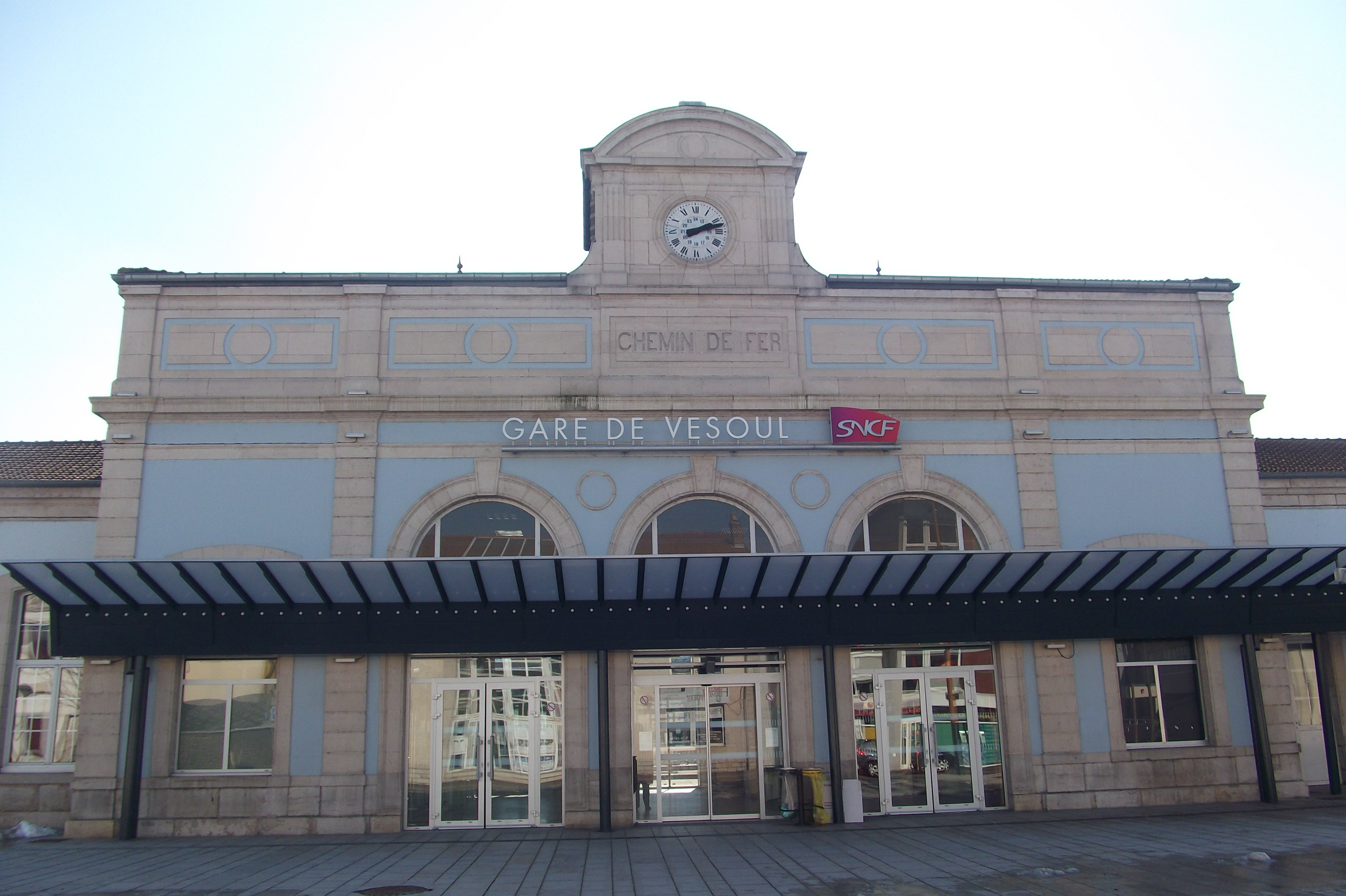

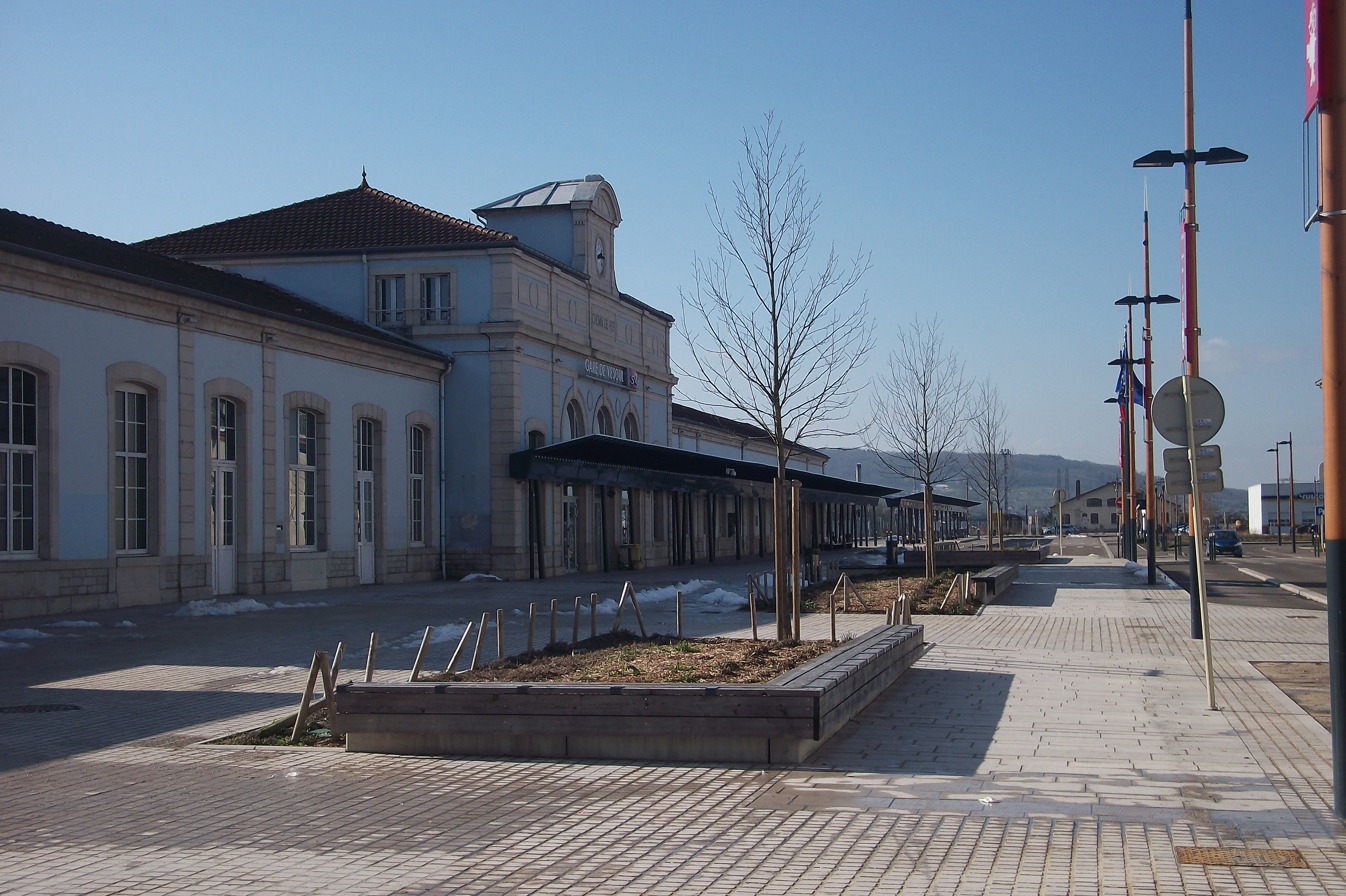
