= Genlis station =

Railway station in Genlis, France

Genlis
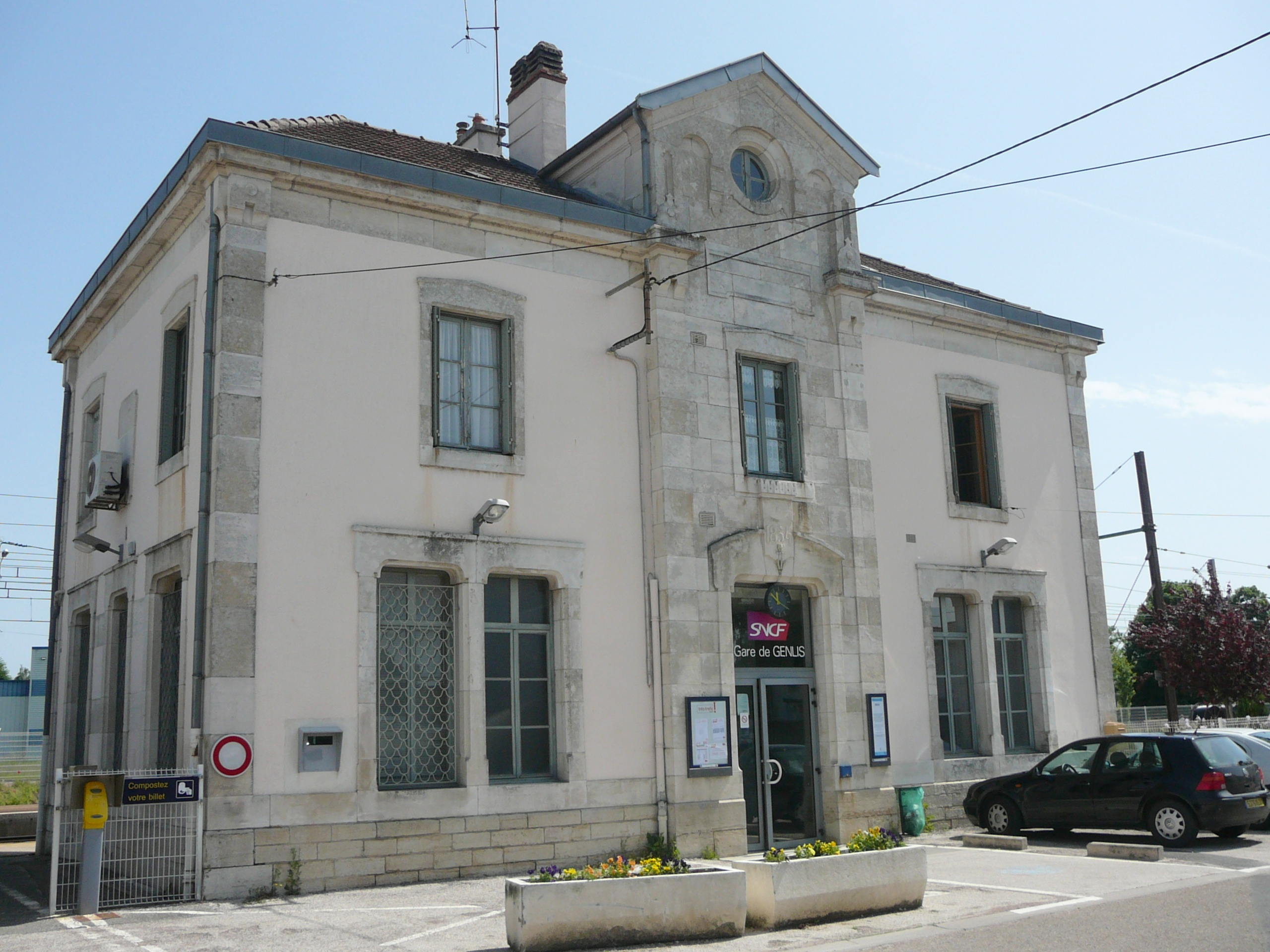
- The station building in 2009

General information
- Location: Genlis; France
- Coordinates: 47°14′40″N 5°13′24″E
- Owner: SNCF
- Line: Dijon–Vallorbe line
- Distance: 332.8 km (206.8 mi) from Paris-Lyon
- Train operators: SNCF

Other information
- Station code: 87713313

Passengers
- 2018: 220,044

Services
Preceding station	TER Bourgogne-Franche-Comté	Following station
Neuilly-lès-Dijon towards Dijon	TER	Collonges towards Besançon
Location

Genlis station (French: Gare de Genlis) is a railway station in the commune of Genlis, in the French department of Côte-d'Or, in the Bourgogne-Franche-Comté region. It is an intermediate stop on the Dijon–Vallorbe line of SNCF.

== Services ==
The following services stop at Genlis:

- TER Bourgogne-Franche-Comté: regional service between Dijon-Ville and Besançon-Viotte.
