= Collonges-lès-Premières =

- Part of Collonges-et-Premières
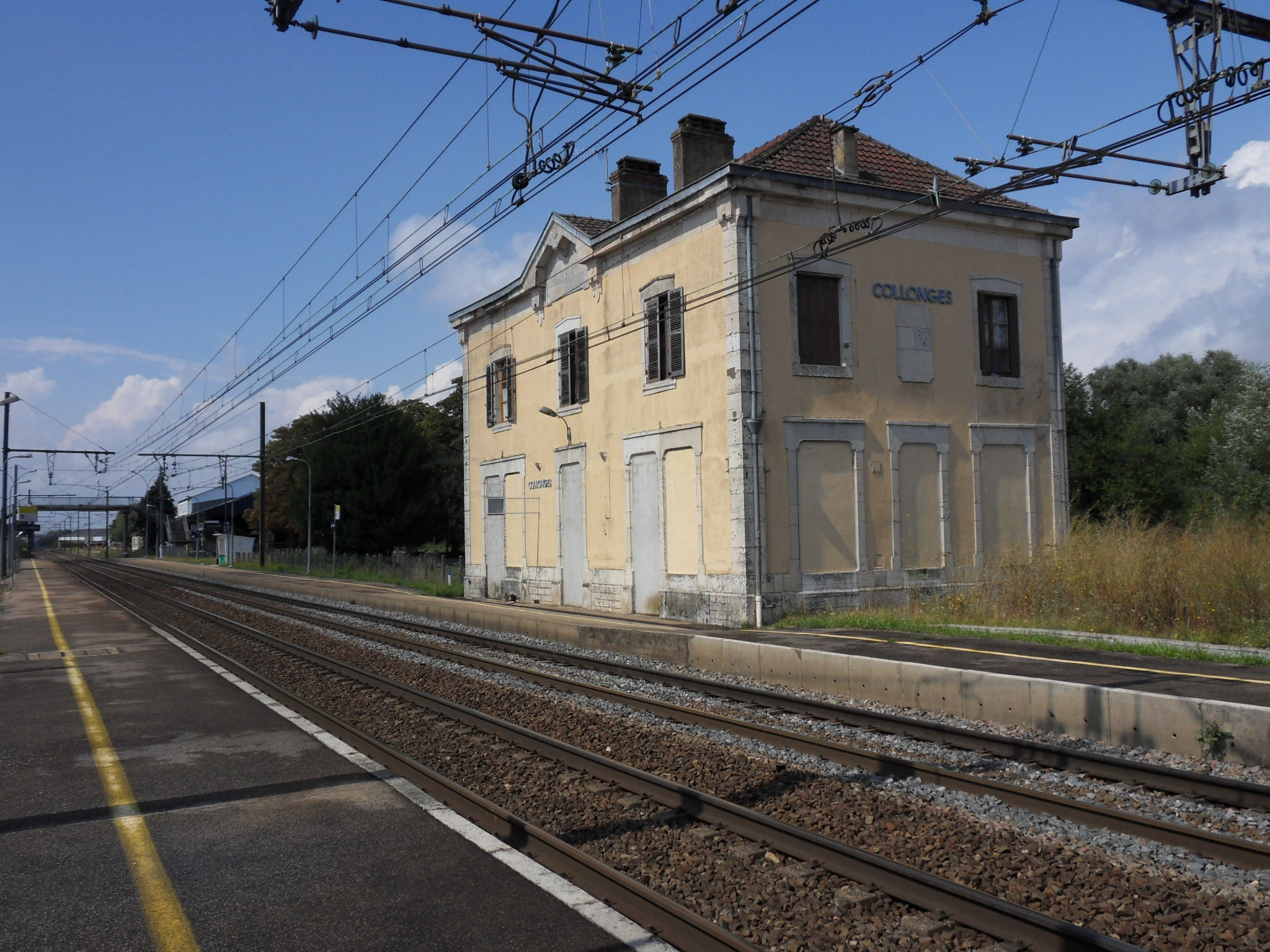
- Train station

- Coat of arms
- Location of Collonges-lès-Premières
- Location within France Location within Bourgogne-Franche-Comté
- Coordinates: 47°13′32″N 5°16′09″E
- Country: France
- Region: Bourgogne-Franche-Comté
- Department: Côte-d'Or
- Arrondissement: Dijon
- Canton: Genlis
- Commune: Collonges-et-Premières
- Area^{1}: 9.42 km^{2} (3.64 sq mi)
- Highest elevation: 227 m (745 ft)
- Lowest elevation: 192 m (630 ft)
- Population (2023): 922
  - Density: 97.9/km^{2} (253/sq mi)
- Time zone: UTC+01:00 (CET)
  - Summer (DST): UTC+02:00 (CEST)
- Postal code: 21110
- ^{1} French Land Register data, which excludes lakes, ponds, glaciers > 1 km^{2} (0.386 sq mi or 247 acres) and river estuaries.

Collonges-lès-Premières (French pronunciation: [kɔlɔ̃ʒ lɛ pʁəmjɛʁ], literally Collonges near Premières) is a former commune in the Côte-d'Or department in eastern France. On 28 February 2019, it was merged into the new commune of Collonges-et-Premières.

== Transportation ==
The commune has a railway station, Collonges, on the Dijon–Vallorbe line.

== See also ==
- Communes of the Côte-d'Or department
