= Belfort-Montbéliard TGV station =

High speed railway station in Meroux, Territoire de Belfort, France

Belfort-Montbéliard TGV
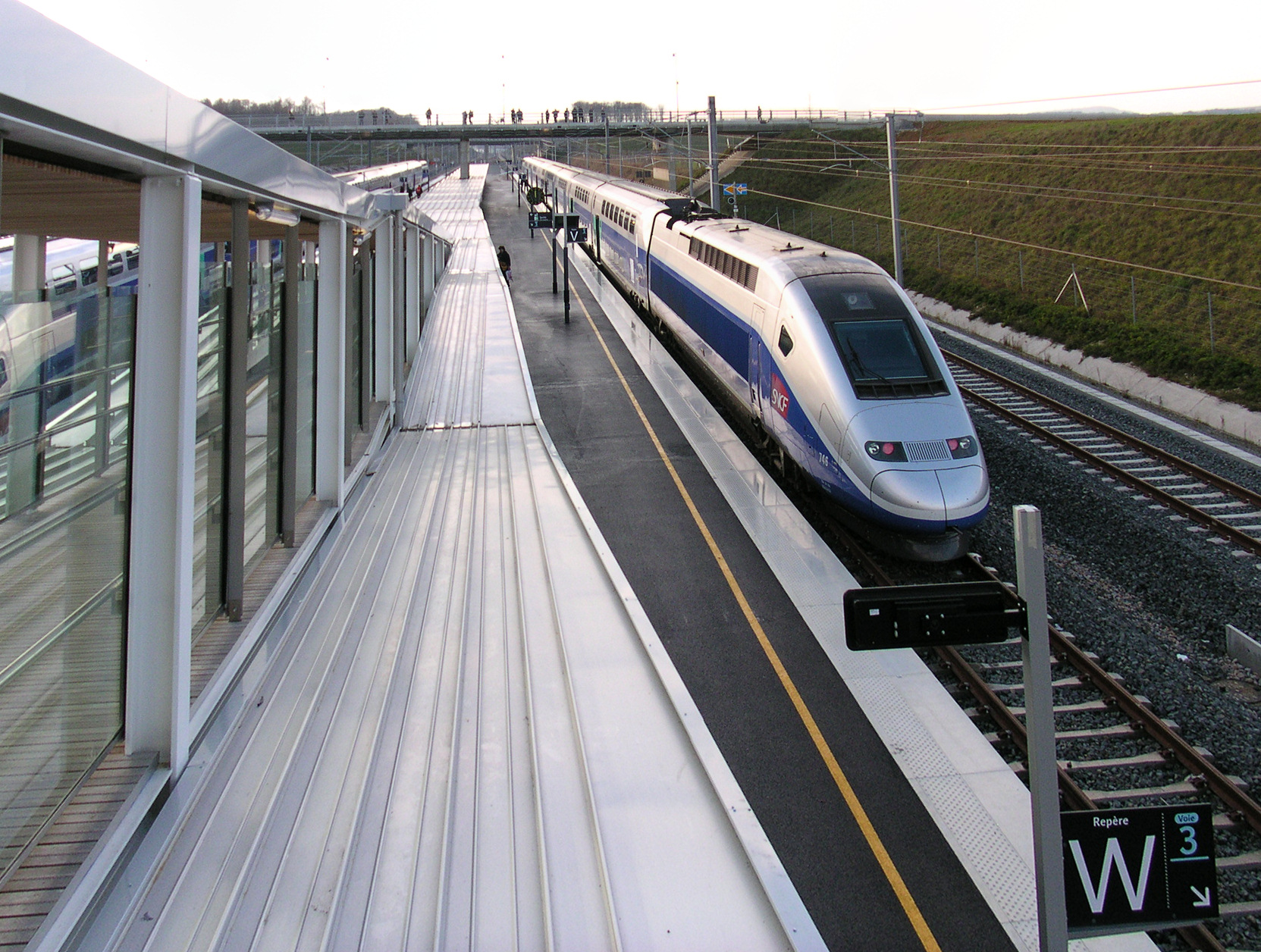
- TGV Duplex at Belfort-Montbéliard TGV railway station

General information
- Location: Meroux, Territoire de Belfort, Franche-Comté, France
- Coordinates: 47°35′09″N 6°53′51″E
- Lines: LGV Rhin-Rhône; Belfort–Delle railway (from 2018)
- Platforms: 2
- Tracks: 4

Other information
- Station code: 87300822

History
- Opened: 11 December 2011
Location

Belfort-Montbéliard TGV is a high speed railway station located in Meroux, Territoire de Belfort, eastern France. The station was opened in 2011 and is located on the LGV Rhin-Rhône connecting railway. The train services are operated by SNCF. It serves the cities of Belfort and Montbéliard and surrounding areas. The station lies 9 km south of Belfort and 18 km northeast of Montbéliard.

At the station, the railway line from Belfort to Delle crosses the high speed line with an overpass. There is a stop on this line, Meroux, at a short walking distance of the TGV station, which offers access to TER Bourgogne-Franche-Comté services to Belfort and Delle, and RegioExpress services to Delle and Delémont (Switzerland).

== Train services ==
From Belfort-Montbéliard TGV, train services depart to major French cities such as: Paris, Dijon, Besançon, Mulhouse, Strasbourg, Lyon, Marseille, Montpellier and Lille.

International services operate to Switzerland: Basel and Zurich.

- High speed services (TGV) Paris - Dijon - Belfort - Mulhouse - Basel - Zurich
- High speed services (TGV) Paris - Dijon - Belfort - Mulhouse
- High speed services (TGV) (Nice -) Marseille - Lyon - Dijon - Strasbourg (- Nancy )
- High speed services (TGV) Marseille / Montpellier - Lyon - Belfort - Mulhouse - Strasbourg / Metz / Luxembourg
- High speed services (ICE) Marseille - Avignon - Lyon - Belfort - Mulhouse - Strasbourg - Frankfurt
- High speed services (TGV) Lille - Paris-Charles de Gaulle Airport - Dijon - Belfort - Mulhouse

Preceding station	SNCF	Following station
Paris-Lyon Terminus	TGV Lyria	Mulhouse-Ville towards Zürich Hbf
Besançon Franche-Comté TGV towards Paris-Lyon	TGV inOui	Mulhouse-Ville Terminus
Besançon Franche-Comté TGV towards Marseille	TGV inOui	Mulhouse-Ville towards Frankfurt
Besançon Franche-Comté TGV towards Marseille or Montpellier	TGV inOui	Mulhouse-Ville towards Luxembourg
Besançon Franche-Comté TGV towards Nice-Ville	TGV inOui	Mulhouse-Ville towards Nancy-Ville
Besançon Franche-Comté TGV towards Montpellier	TGV inOui	Mulhouse-Ville towards Metz
Preceding station	DB Fernverkehr	Following station
Besançon Franche-Comté TGV towards Marseille	ICE/TGV 84	Mulhouse-Ville towards Frankfurt (Main) Hbf
Preceding station	TER Bourgogne-Franche-Comté	Following station
Danjoutin towards Belfort	TER	Morvillars towards Delle
