= Petit-Croix =

- Commune
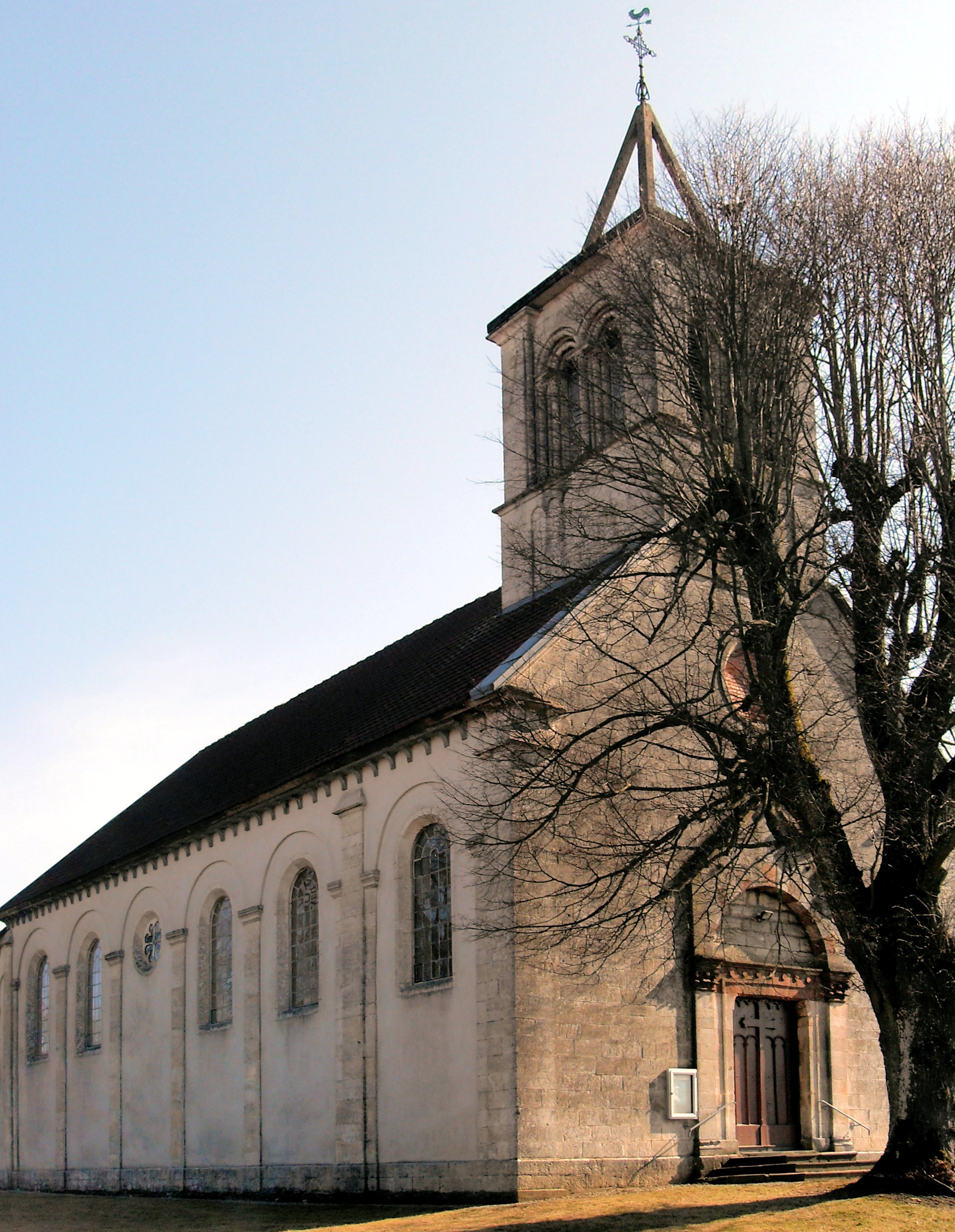
- Church of the Nativity of Our Lady

- Coat of arms
- Location of Petit-Croix
- Location within France Location within Bourgogne-Franche-Comté
- Coordinates: 47°36′51″N 6°58′25″E
- Country: France
- Region: Bourgogne-Franche-Comté
- Department: Territoire de Belfort
- Arrondissement: Belfort
- Canton: Grandvillars
- Intercommunality: Grand Belfort

Government
  - Mayor (2024–2026): Isabelle Segura
- Area^{1}: 3.79 km^{2} (1.46 sq mi)
- Highest elevation: 376 m (1,234 ft)
- Lowest elevation: 336 m (1,102 ft)
- Population (2023): 308
  - Density: 81.3/km^{2} (210/sq mi)
- Time zone: UTC+01:00 (CET)
  - Summer (DST): UTC+02:00 (CEST)
- INSEE/Postal code: 90077 /90130
- ^{1} French Land Register data, which excludes lakes, ponds, glaciers > 1 km^{2} (0.386 sq mi or 247 acres) and river estuaries.

Petit-Croix (French pronunciation: [pəti kʁwa], literally Little Cross) is a commune in the Territoire de Belfort department in Bourgogne-Franche-Comté in northeastern France.

== See also ==
- Communes of the Territoire de Belfort department
