= Dijon-Ville station =

Railway station in Dijon, France

Dijon-Ville
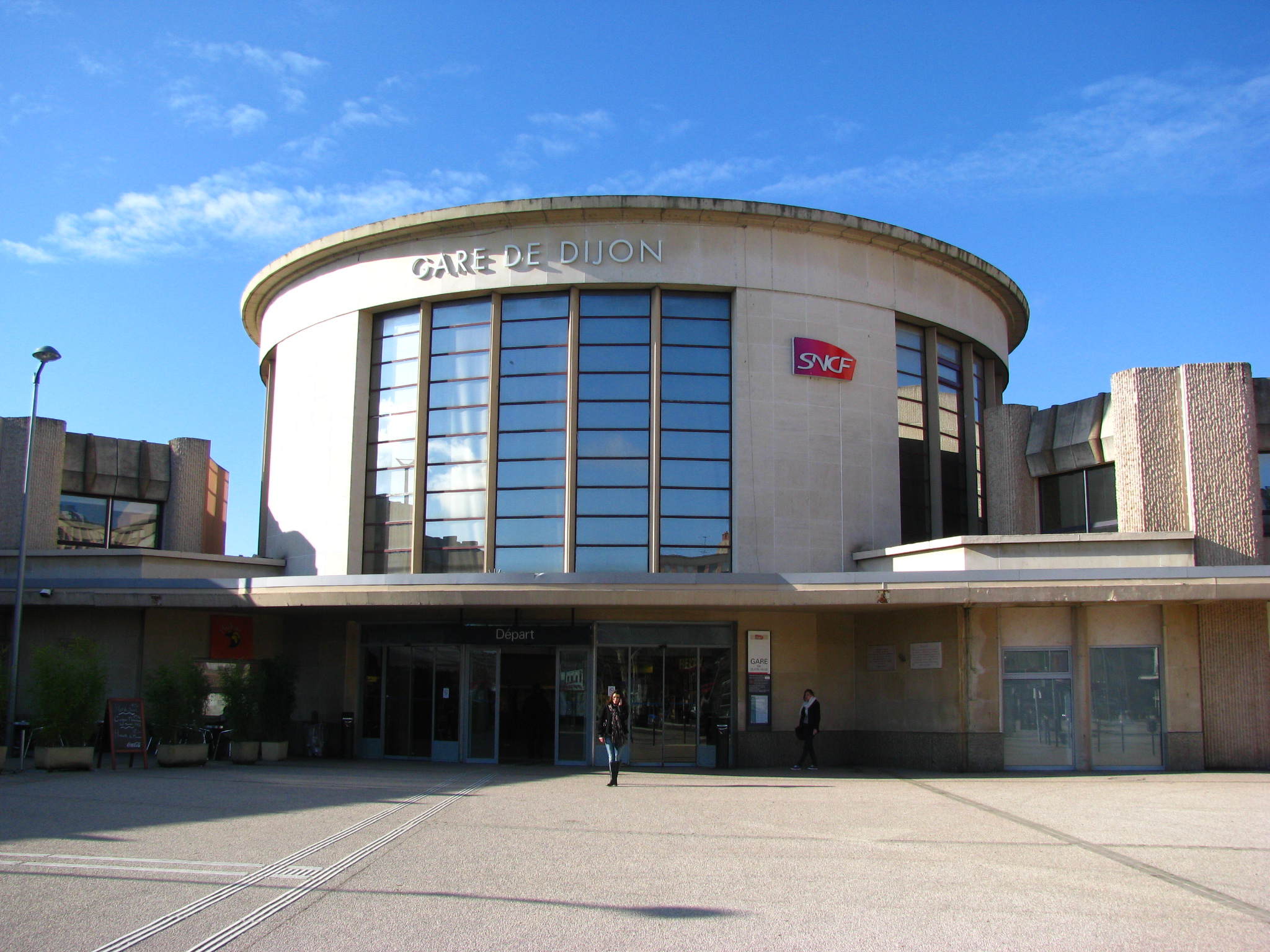
- The station building in 2011

General information
- Location: Dijon; France
- Coordinates: 47°19′24″N 5°01′38″E
- Owner: SNCF
- Lines: Dijon–Saint-Amour line; Dijon–Is-sur-Tille line; Dijon–Vallorbe line; Paris-Marseille line
- Distance: 314.2 km (195.2 mi) from Paris-Lyon
- Platforms: 11
- Tracks: 11
- Train operators: SNCF; TGV Lyria

Other information
- Station code: 87713040

History
- Opened: 12 August 1849; 177 years ago

Passengers
- 2024: 8,102,780
Services
Preceding station	SNCF	Following station
Paris-Lyon Terminus	TGV Lyria	Mulhouse-Ville towards Zürich Hbf
Paris-Lyon Terminus	TGV Lyria	Dole-Ville towards Lausanne
Paris-Lyon Terminus	TGV inOui	Besançon Franche-Comté TGV towards Mulhouse-Ville
Montbard towards Paris-Lyon	TGV inOui	Besançon Franche-Comté TGV towards Besançon-Viotte
Montbard towards Paris-Lyon	TGV inOui	Dole-Ville towards Besançon-Viotte
Besançon Franche-Comté TGV towards Nancy-Ville	TGV inOui	Mâcon-Ville towards Nice-Ville
Besançon Franche-Comté TGV towards Metz	TGV inOui	Mâcon-Ville towards Montpellier
Besançon Franche-Comté TGV towards Luxembourg	TGV inOui	Mâcon-Ville towards Montpellier Sud de France
Preceding station	Ouigo	Following station
Melun towards Paris-Bercy	Train Classique	Chalon-sur-Saône towards Lyon-Perrache
Preceding station	TER Bourgogne-Franche-Comté	Following station
Terminus	TER	Genlis towards Besançon
Terminus	TER	Ouges towards Bourg-en-Bresse
Dijon-Porte-Neuve towards Is-sur-Tille	TER	Terminus
Terminus	TER	Gevrey-Chambertin towards Lyon-Part-Dieu
Beaune towards Nevers	TER	Terminus
Les Laumes-Alésia towards Paris-Bercy	TER	Terminus
Velars towards Auxerre	TER	Terminus
Beaune towards Moulins-sur-Allier	TER	Terminus
Preceding station	TER Grand Est	Following station
Dijon-Porte-Neuve towards Paris-Est	C04	Terminus
Is-sur-Tille towards Nancy	L07	Terminus
Location

Dijon-Ville station (French: Gare de Dijon-Ville), sometimes simply Dijon, is a railway station located in Dijon, Côte-d'Or, eastern France. The station was opened in 1849. It is located at the junction of Paris–Marseille, Dijon–Saint-Amour, Dijon–Is-sur-Tille, and Dijon-Vallorbe lines. The train services are operated by SNCF and Lyria.

== Services ==
From Dijon train services depart to major French cities such as: Paris, Lyon, Marseille, Nice, Montpellier, Belfort, Besançon, Mulhouse, Strasbourg.

International services operate to Switzerland: Zürich, Basel, Lausanne and Luxembourg.

=== High speed (TGV) ===
- Paris - Dijon - Besançon - Belfort - Mulhouse
- Paris - Dijon - Besançon-Viotte
- Paris - Dijon - Lausanne
- Paris - Dijon - Mulhouse - Basel - Zürich
- Paris - Dijon - Chalon-sur-Saône
- Luxembourg - Strasbourg - Besançon - Dijon - Lyon - Montpellier /Marseille
- Nancy - Strasbourg - Dijon - Lyon - Avignon - Marseille - Cannes - Nice
- Metz - Strasbourg - Besançon - Dijon - Lyon - Valence TGV - Montpellier

=== Intercity (Ouigo) ===
- Paris - Dijon - Lyon

=== Regional (TER Bourgogne-Franche-Comté) ===
- Dijon - Beaune - Montchanin - Le Creusot - Étang - Nevers
- Dijon - Beaune - Chagny - Chalon-sur-Saône
- Dijon - Dole - Besançon
- Dijon - Montbard - Laroche-Migennes - Auxerre
- Dijon - Beaune - Chagny - Chalon-sur-Saône - Macon - Lyon
- Dijon - St-Jean-de-Losne - Seurre - Louhans - Bourg-en-Bresse
- Dijon - Is-sur-Tille
- Paris - Sens - Laroche-Migennes - Dijon
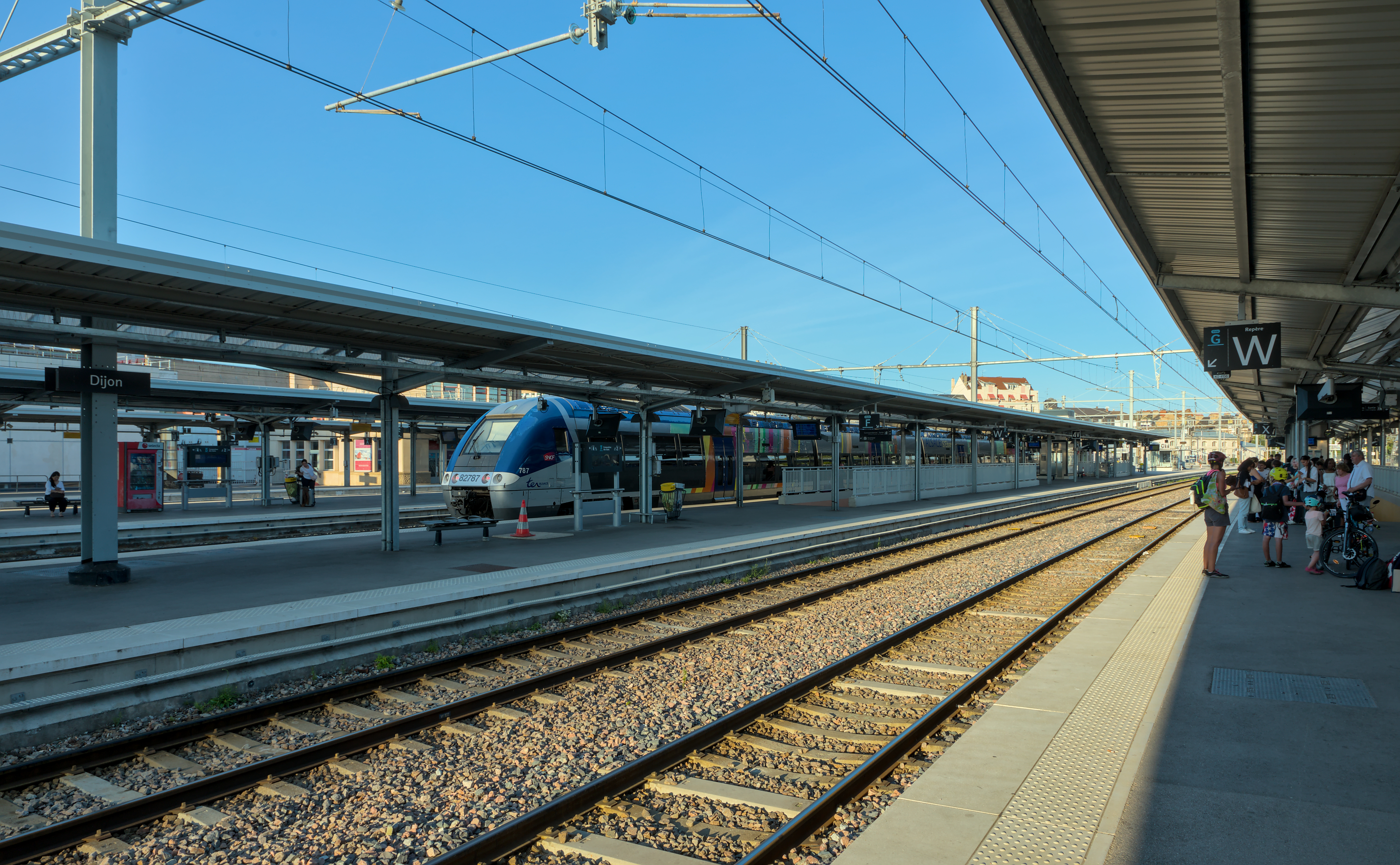
The platforms in late afternoon

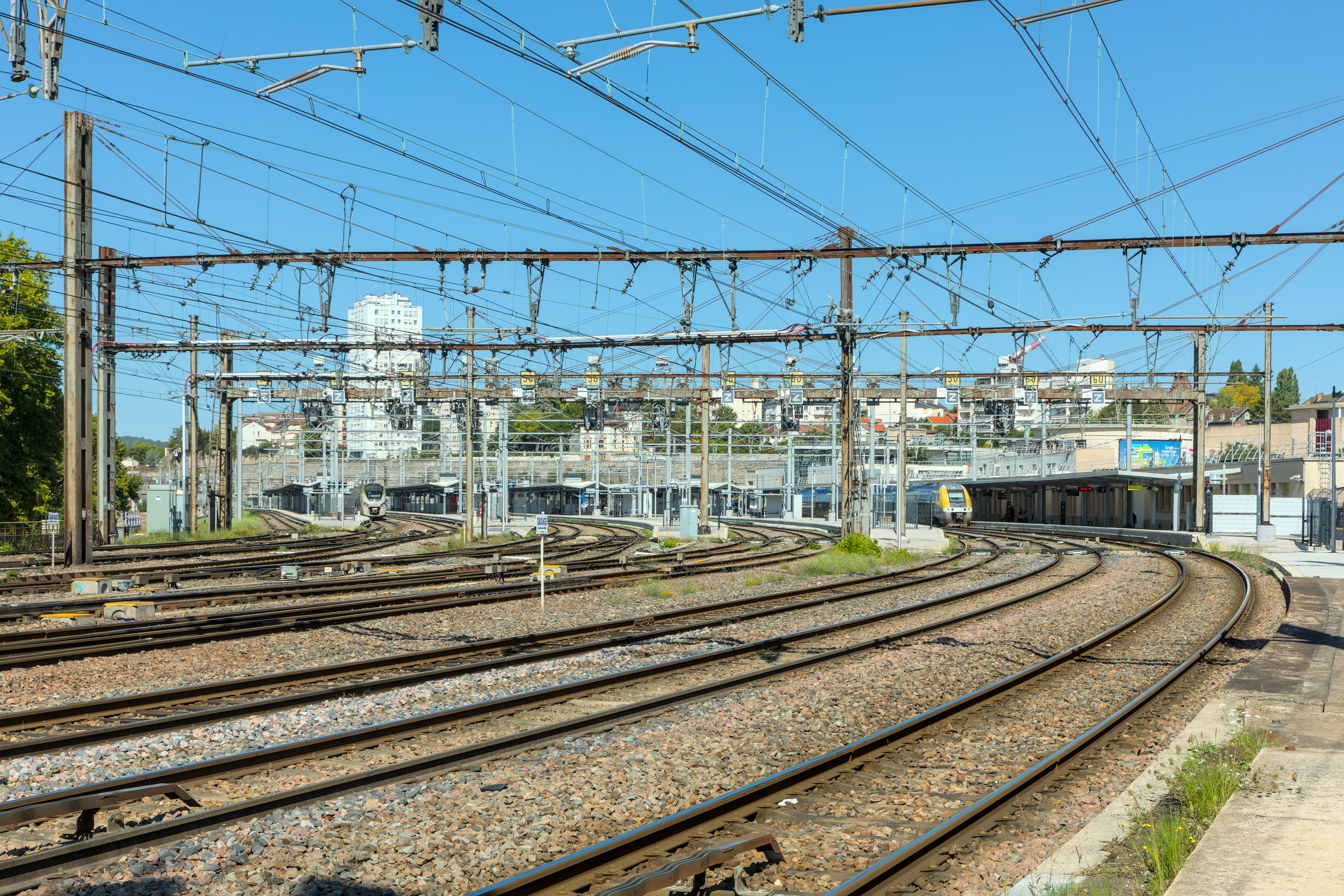
Rail tracks at the East entrance of the station
