= Premières =

Commune in Côte-d'Or, France

- Part of Collonges-et-Premières
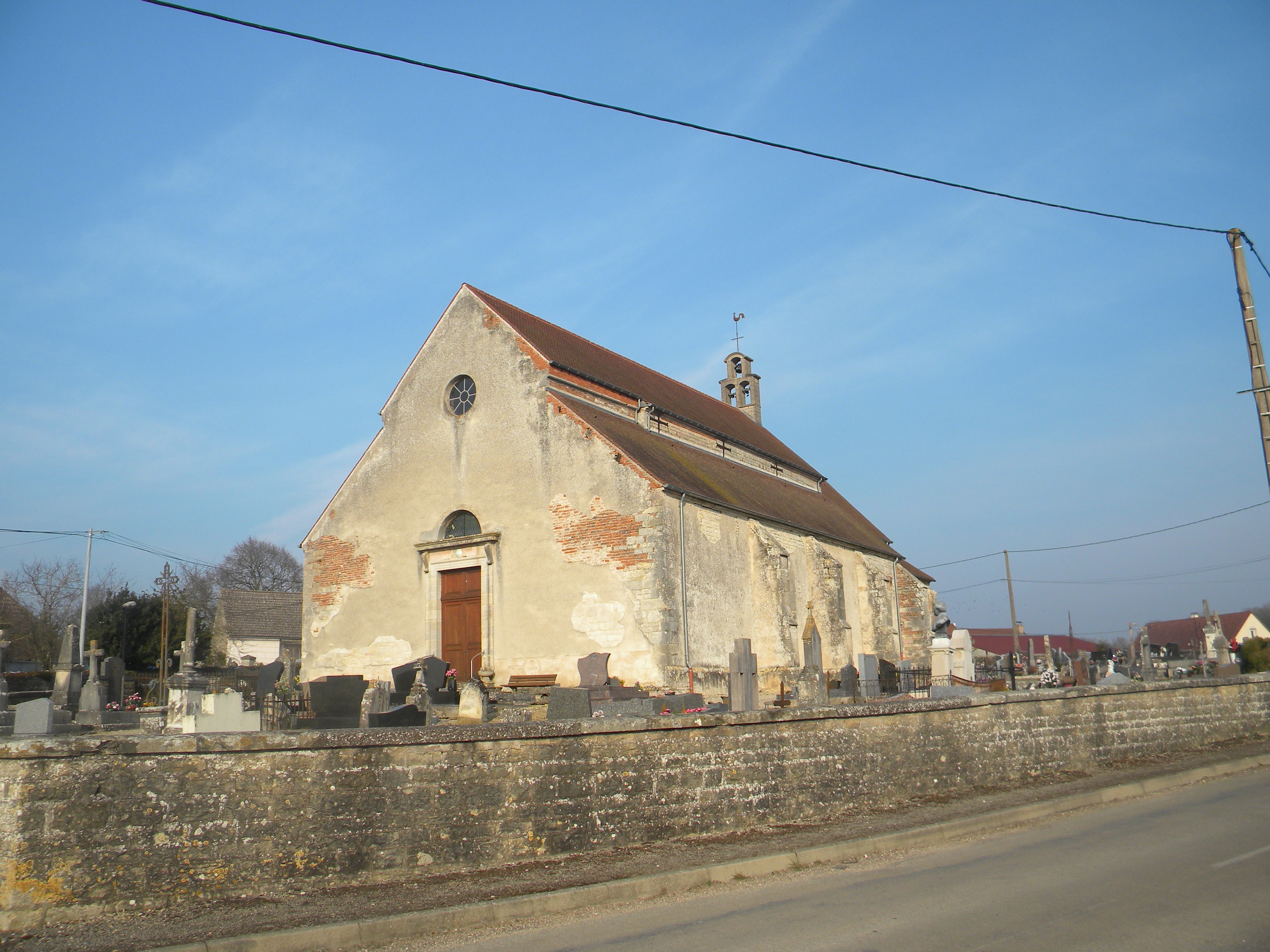
- The church in Premières
- Location of Premières
- Location within France Location within Bourgogne-Franche-Comté
- Coordinates: 47°14′06″N 5°17′05″E
- Country: France
- Region: Bourgogne-Franche-Comté
- Department: Côte-d'Or
- Arrondissement: Dijon
- Canton: Genlis
- Commune: Collonges-et-Premières
- Area^{1}: 3.14 km^{2} (1.21 sq mi)
- Highest elevation: 211 m (692 ft)
- Lowest elevation: 193 m (633 ft)
- Population (2023): 145
  - Density: 46.2/km^{2} (120/sq mi)
- Time zone: UTC+01:00 (CET)
  - Summer (DST): UTC+02:00 (CEST)
- Postal code: 21110
- ^{1} French Land Register data, which excludes lakes, ponds, glaciers > 1 km^{2} (0.386 sq mi or 247 acres) and river estuaries.

Premières (French pronunciation: [pʁəmjɛʁ]) is a former commune in the Côte-d'Or department in eastern France. On 28 February 2019, it was merged into the new commune of Collonges-et-Premières.

== See also ==
- Communes of the Côte-d'Or department
- Premiere
