= École-Valentin station =

Railway station in École-Valentin, France

École-Valentin
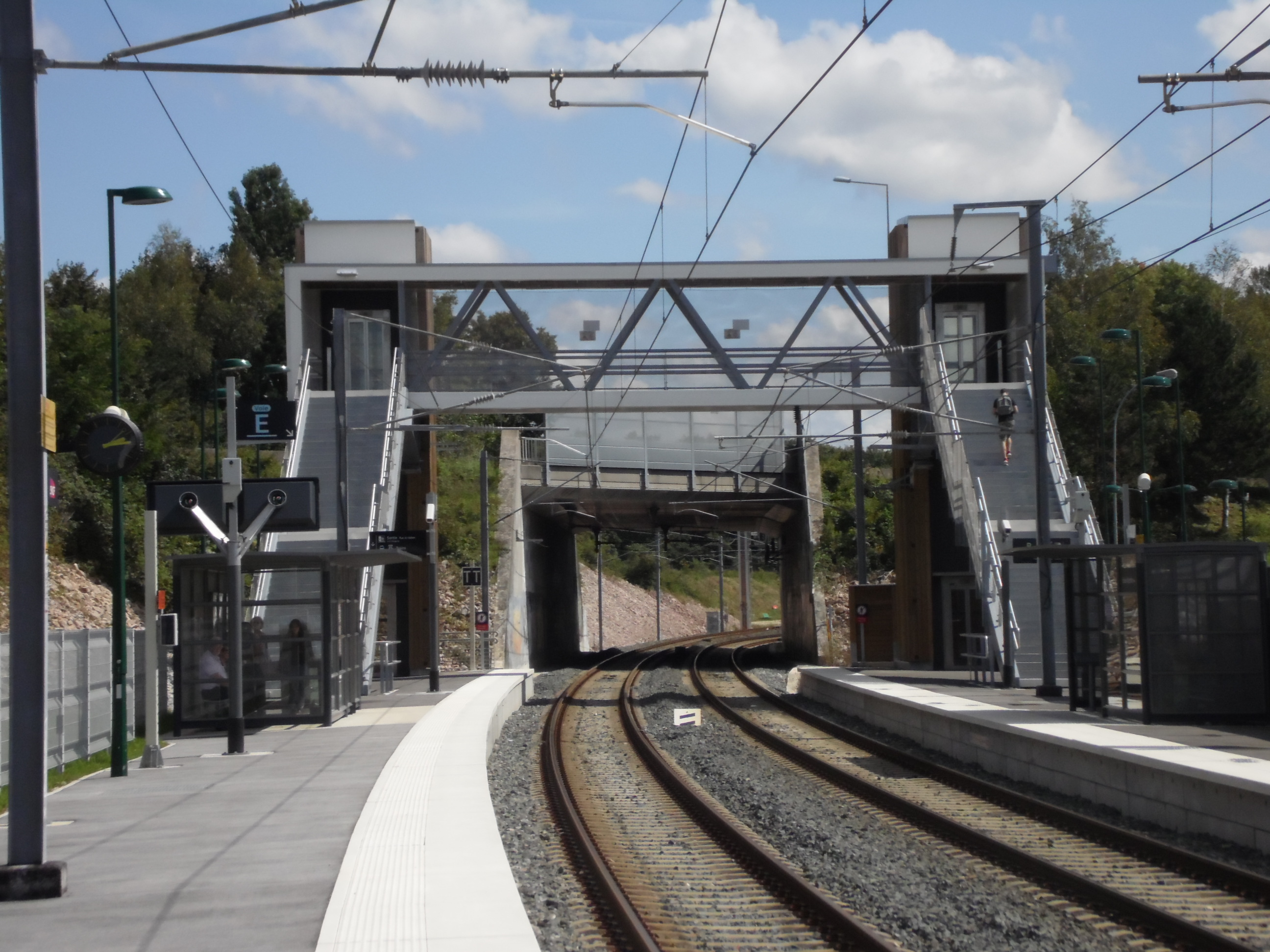
- École-Valentin railway station

General information
- Location: École-Valentin, Doubs, Bourgogne-Franche-Comté, France
- Coordinates: 47°16′31″N 5°59′31″E
- Elevation: 318 m (1,043 ft)
- Line: Besançon-Viotte-Vesoul railway
- Platforms: 2
- Tracks: 2

Other information
- Station code: 87710731

History
- Opened: 3 September 2013

Passengers
- 2018: 5 684

Services
Preceding station	TER Bourgogne-Franche-Comté	Following station
Besançon-Viotte Terminus	TER	Besançon Franche-Comté TGV Terminus
Location

École-Valentin is a railway station located in École-Valentin, Doubs, eastern France. The station was opened in 2013 and is located on the Besançon-Viotte-Vesoul railway connecting railway, linking Besançon with Besançon Franche-Comté TGV. The train services are operated by SNCF.
