= Mâcon-Ville station =

Railway station in Mâcon, France

Coordinates: 46°18′10″N 4°49′31″E

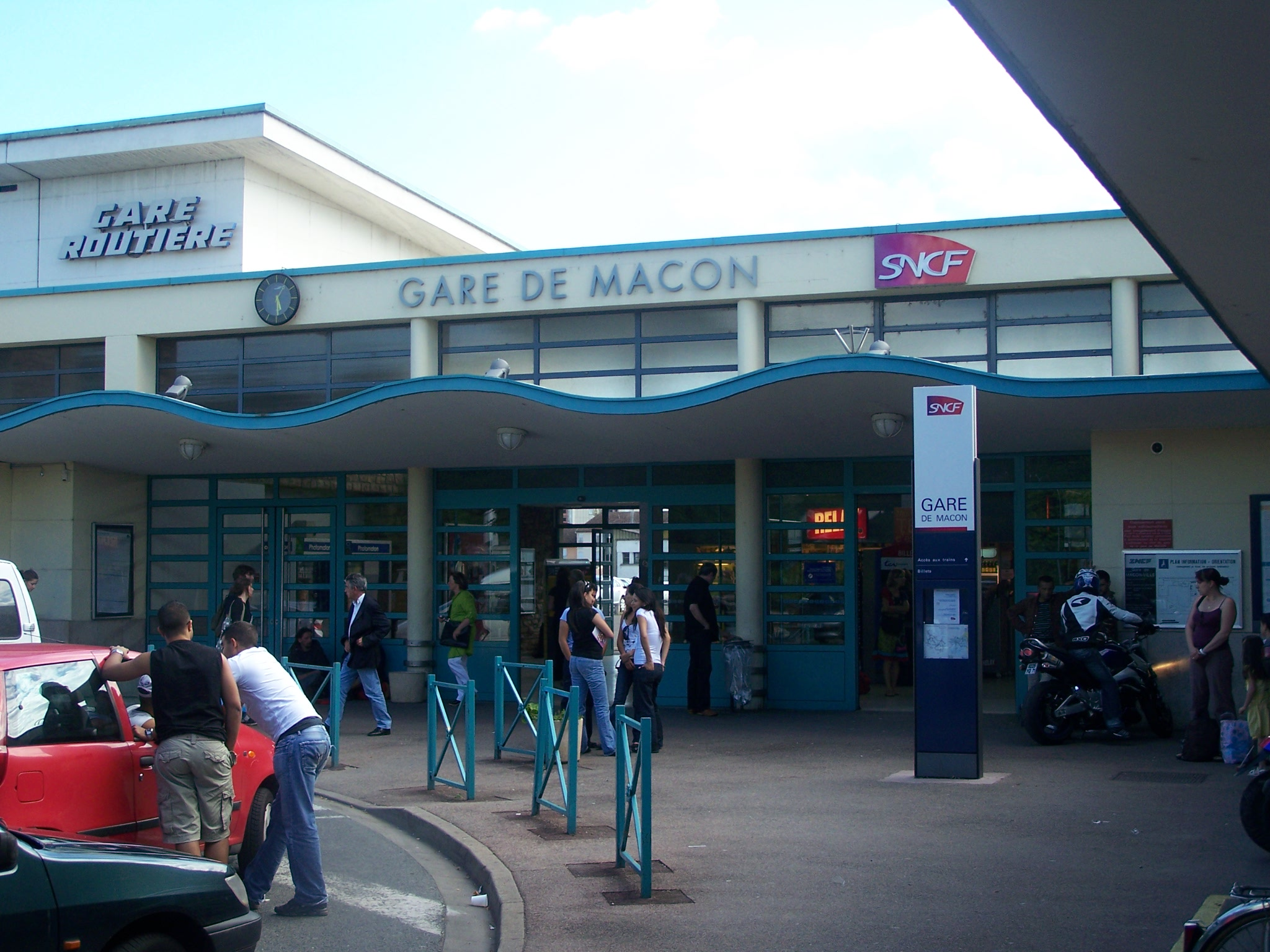
The station building

Mâcon-Ville station (French: Gare de Mâcon-Ville) is a railway station serving Mâcon, in the Saône-et-Loire department, eastern France.

== Services ==
The station is served by regional trains towards Beaune, Dijon, Bourg-en-Bresse and Lyon.

Preceding station	DB Fernverkehr	Following station
Lyon-Part-Dieu towards Marseille	ICE/TGV 84	Besançon Franche-Comté TGV towards Frankfurt (Main) Hbf
Preceding station	Ouigo	Following station
Chalon-sur-Saône towards Paris-Bercy	Train Classique	Lyon-Part-Dieu towards Lyon-Perrache
Preceding station	TER Bourgogne-Franche-Comté	Following station
Senozan towards Dijon	TER	Belleville-sur-Saône towards Lyon-Part-Dieu
Preceding station	TER Auvergne-Rhône-Alpes	Following station
Terminus	24	Crêches-sur-Saône towards Lyon-Perrache
Terminus	30	Pont-de-Veyle towards Ambérieu

== See also ==
- List of SNCF stations in Bourgogne-Franche-Comté
- TER Bourgogne-Franche-Comté
- TER Auvergne-Rhône-Alpes
