= Chalon-sur-Saône station =

Railway station in Chalon-sur-Saône, France

Coordinates: 46°46′53″N 4°50′34″E

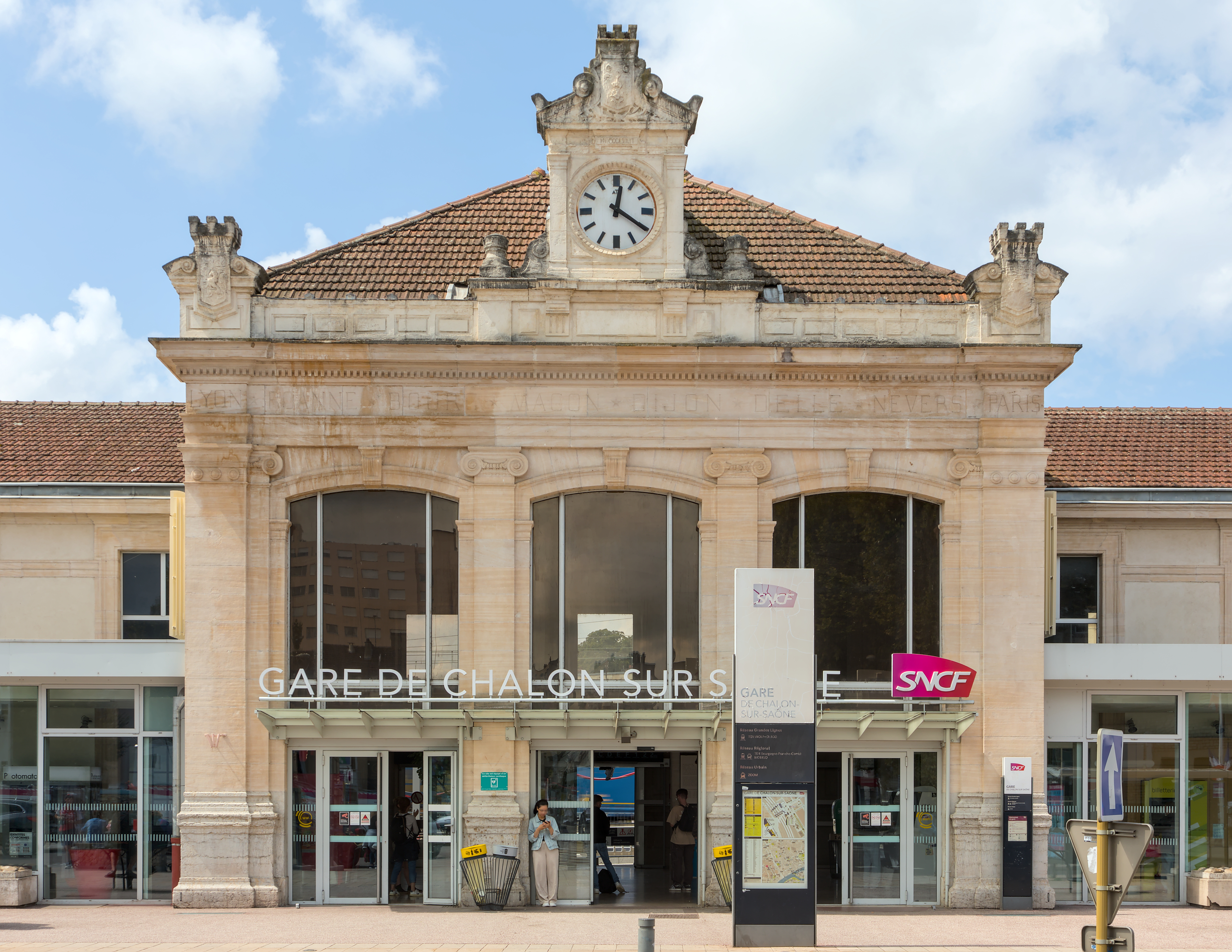
Gare de Chalon-sur-Saône

Gare de Chalon-sur-Saône is the railway station serving the town Chalon-sur-Saône, Saône-et-Loire department, eastern France. It is situated on the Paris–Marseille railway, at kilometre post 382.150 from Paris Gare de Lyon, and at an altitude of 179 m.

The original station in Chalon was built in the centre as a terminus. To avoid trains reversing direction, a bypass containing a new station was planned. In 1893 the old station was closed and all traffic began to serve the modern station.

== Services ==
The station is served by regional trains towards Beaune, Dijon, Mâcon, Lyon and Montchanin.

Preceding station	SNCF	Following station
Beaune towards Paris-Lyon	TGV inOui	Terminus
Besançon Franche-Comté TGV towards Frankfurt	TGV inOui	Lyon-Part-Dieu towards Marseille
Preceding station	Ouigo	Following station
Dijon-Ville towards Paris-Bercy	Train Classique	Mâcon-Ville towards Lyon-Perrache
Preceding station	TER Bourgogne-Franche-Comté	Following station
Fontaines-Mercurey towards Dijon	TER	Sennecey-le-Grand towards Lyon-Part-Dieu
Chagny towards Montchanin	TER	Terminus
