= Besançon Franche-Comté TGV station =

Railway station in France

Besançon Franche-Comté TGV
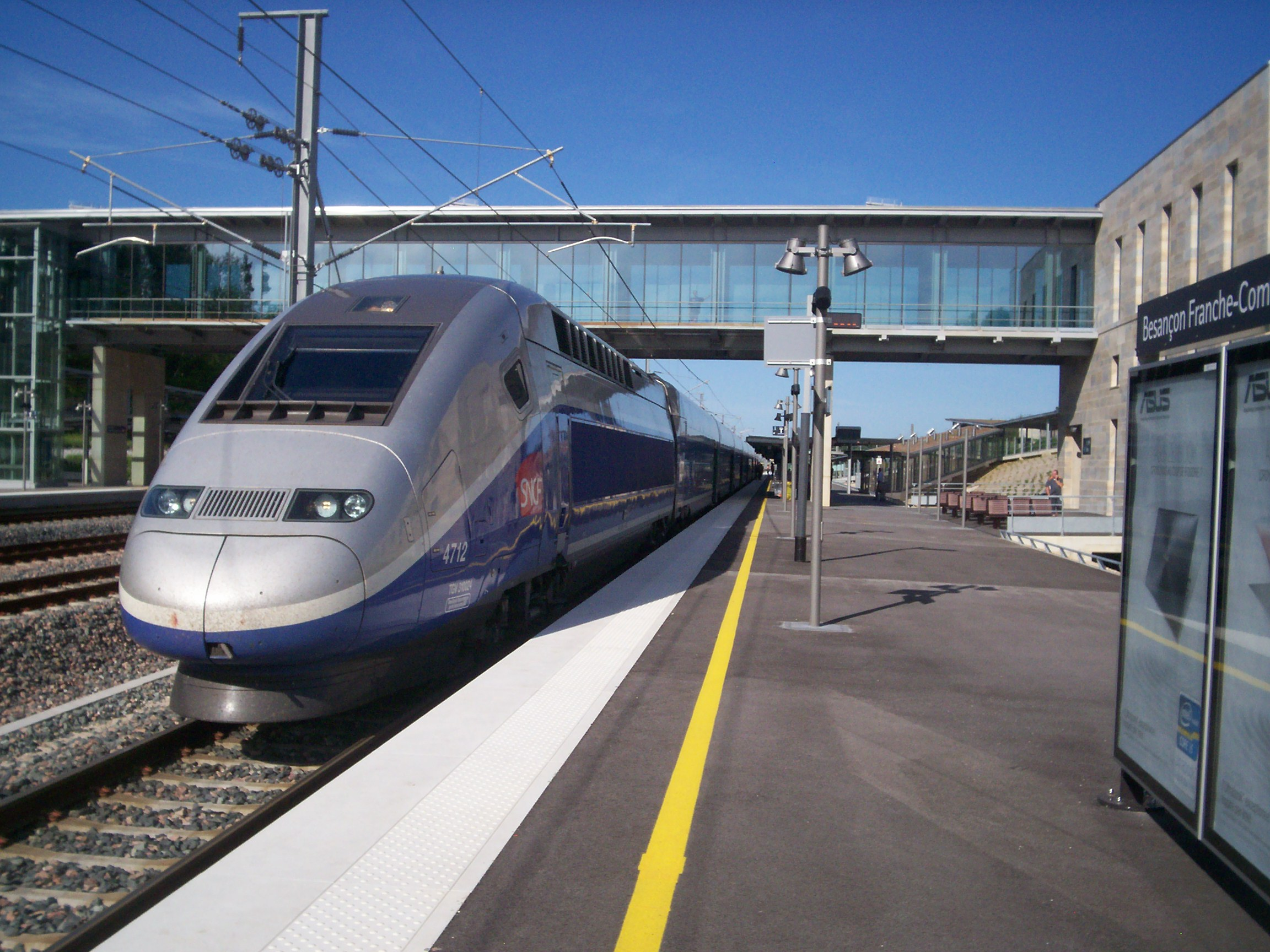
- Besançon Franche-Comté TGV station

General information
- Location: RD1 - Lieu-dit Grand-Bois Le Pasquier; 25870 Les Auxons; Doubs; France
- Coordinates: 47°18′32″N 5°57′28″E
- Elevation: 234 m (768 ft)
- Owner: SNCF
- Operator: SNCF
- Lines: LGV Rhin-Rhône; Besançon-Viotte-Vesoul railway
- Platforms: 3
- Tracks: 6

Construction
- Architect: Jean-Marie Duthilleul

Other information
- Station code: 87300863

History
- Opened: 11 December 2011
Location

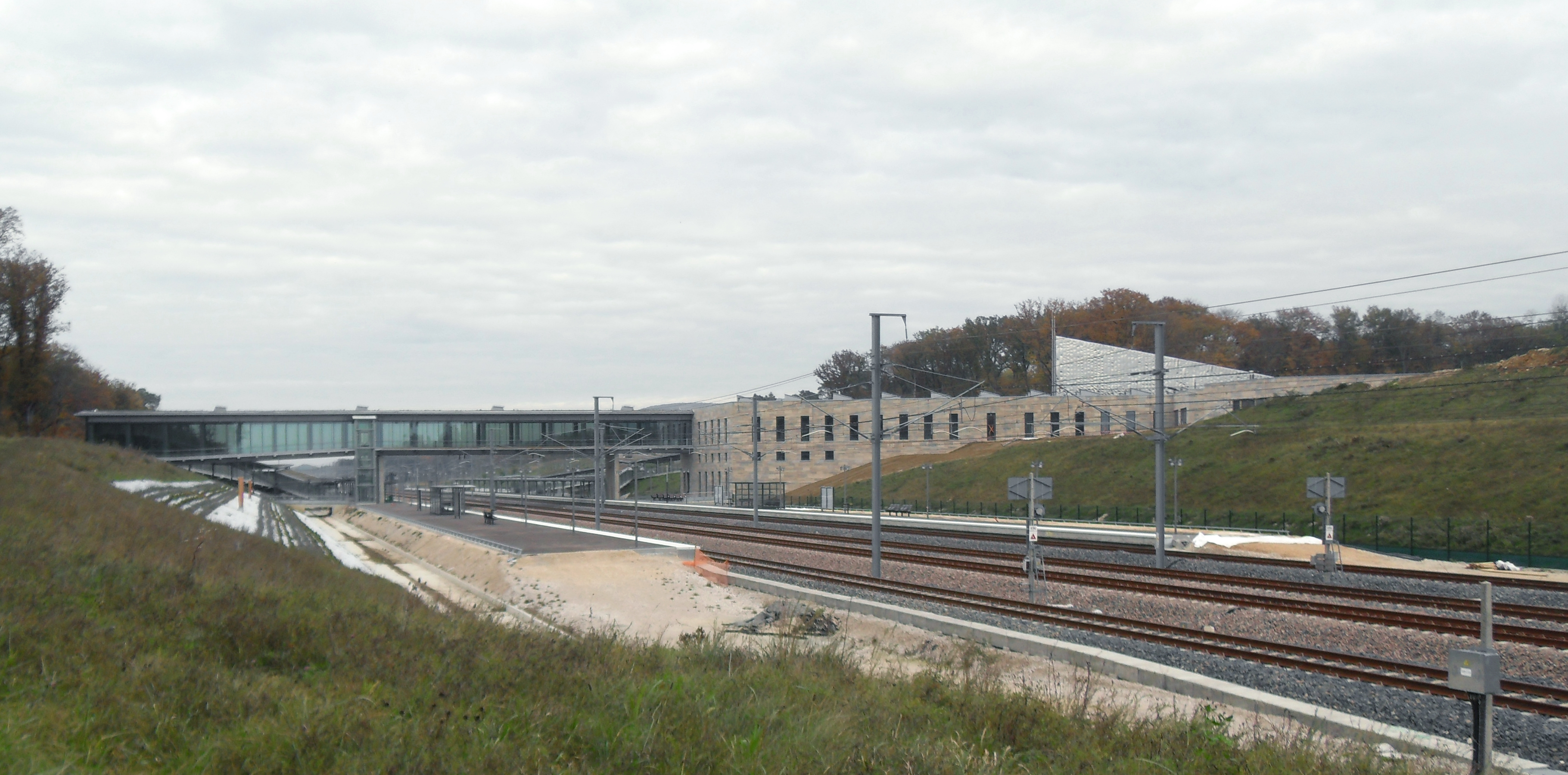
Besançon Franche-Comté TGV station under construction in October 2011.

Besançon Franche-Comté TGV station (French: Gare de Besançon Franche-Comté TGV) is a French high speed railway station located in Les Auxons, Doubs, eastern France. The station was opened in 2011 and is located on the LGV Rhin-Rhône and Besançon-Viotte-Vesoul railway connecting railway. The train services are operated by SNCF. It serves the city of Besançon (10 km south) and surrounding areas.

== Train services ==
From Besançon Franche-Comté TGV train services depart to major French cities such as: Paris, Dijon, Belfort, Mulhouse, Strasbourg, Lyon, Marseille, Montpellier and Lille. International services operate to Germany: Frankfurt (Main) Hbf.

== Bus services ==
Bus services are operated by Besançon operator Ginko.

- 60 Besançon Temis - École Valentin - Miserey Salines - Gare Besançon Franche-Comté TGV.
- 68 Tallenay - Chatillon-le-Duc - Gare Besançon Franche-Comté TGV.
- 69 Pirey - Pouilley-les-Vignes - Pelousey - Auxon-Dessous - Auxon-Dessus - Gare Besançon Franche-Comté TGV

Preceding station	SNCF	Following station
Dijon-Ville towards Paris-Lyon	TGV inOui	Belfort – Montbéliard TGV towards Mulhouse-Ville
Dijon-Ville towards Paris-Lyon	TGV inOui	Besançon-Viotte Terminus
Chalon-sur-Saône towards Marseille	TGV inOui	Belfort – Montbéliard TGV towards Frankfurt
Dijon-Ville towards Marseille	TGV inOui	Belfort – Montbéliard TGV towards Luxembourg
Dijon-Ville towards Nice-Ville	TGV inOui	Belfort – Montbéliard TGV towards Nancy-Ville
Dijon-Ville towards Montpellier	TGV inOui	Belfort – Montbéliard TGV towards Metz
Preceding station	DB Fernverkehr	Following station
Mâcon-Ville towards Marseille	ICE/TGV 84	Belfort – Montbéliard TGV towards Frankfurt (Main) Hbf
Preceding station	TER Bourgogne-Franche-Comté	Following station
École-Valentin towards Besançon	TER	Terminus
