= Mulhouse-Ville station =

Main railway station in Mulhouse, Haut-Rhin, France

Mulhouse
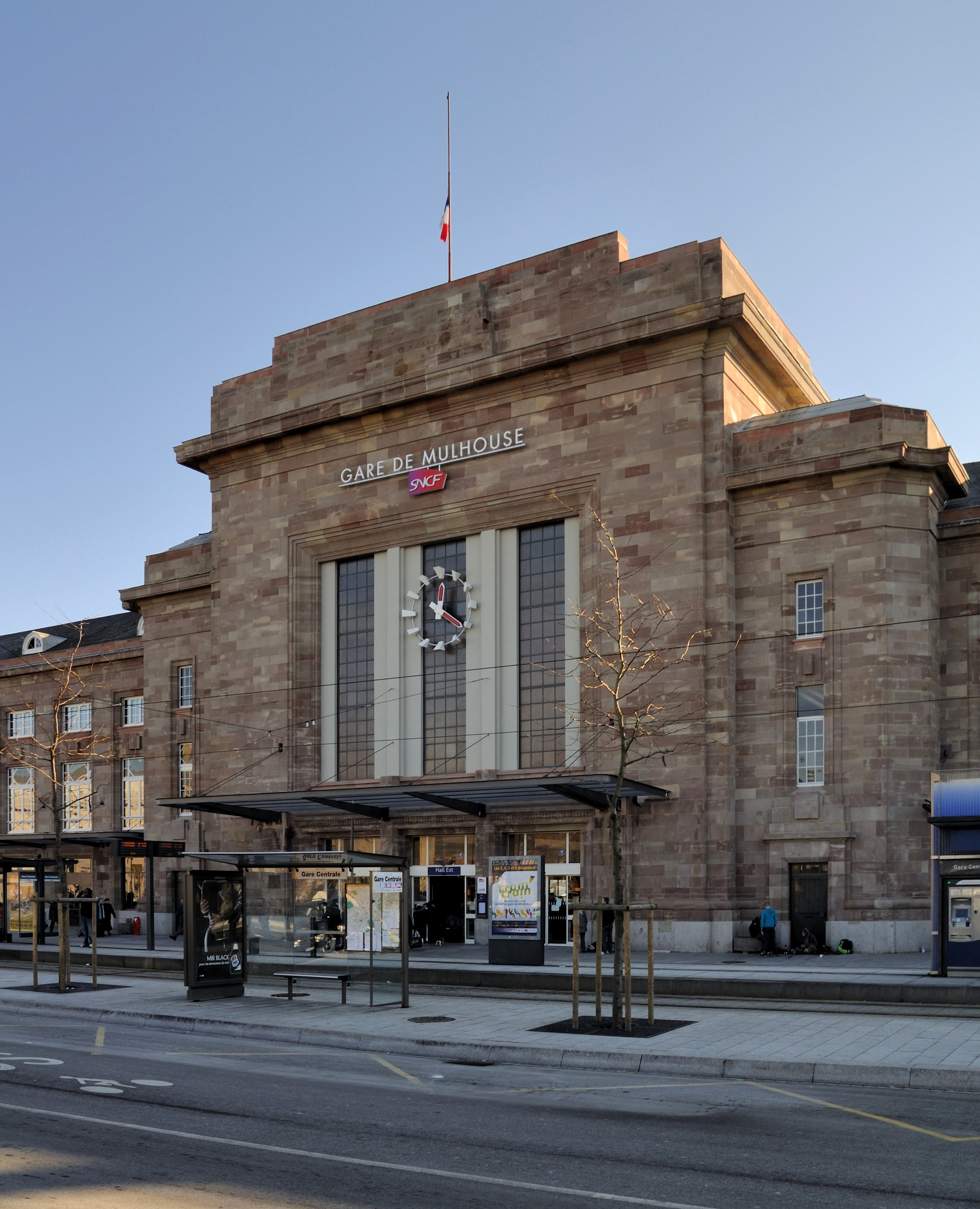

General information
- Location: 10 avenue du Général Leclerc; 68100 Mulhouse; Haut-Rhin; France
- Coordinates: 47.7426°N 7.3433°E
- Owner: SNCF
- Operator: SNCF
- Lines: Mulhouse - Kruth; Paris–Mulhouse railway Strasbourg–Basel railway Müllheim–Mulhouse railway
- Platforms: 5
- Tracks: 8

Other information
- Station code: 87182063

History
- Opened: 1 September 1839; 186 years ago

Passengers
- 2024: 5,702,065
Services
Preceding station	SNCF	Following station
Belfort – Montbéliard TGV towards Paris-Lyon	TGV Lyria	Basel SBB towards Zürich Hbf
Belfort – Montbéliard TGV towards Paris-Lyon	TGV inOui	Terminus
Colmar (Haut-Rhin) towards Luxembourg	TGV inOui	Belfort – Montbéliard TGV towards Southeastern France
Belfort – Montbéliard TGV towards Nice-Ville	TGV inOui	Strasbourg towards Nancy-Ville
Belfort – Montbéliard TGV towards Paris-Lyon	TGV	Terminus
Preceding station	DB Fernverkehr	Following station
Belfort – Montbéliard TGV towards Marseille	ICE/TGV 84	Strasbourg towards Frankfurt (Main) Hbf
Preceding station	TER Grand Est	Following station
Colmar towards Strasbourg	A01	Saint-Louis towards Basel SNCF
Mulhouse-Dornach towards Colmar	A02b	Terminus
Terminus	A15	Rixheim towards Basel SNCF
Flaxlanden towards Belfort	A16	Terminus
Mulhouse-Dornach towards Kruth	A17	Terminus
Altkirch towards Paris-Est	C04	Terminus
Preceding station	Basel S-Bahn	Following station
Terminus	TER	Rixheim towards Basel SBB
Preceding station	DB Regio Baden-Württemberg	Following station
Terminus	RB 28	Bantzenheim towards Freiburg Hbf
Location

The Gare de Mulhouse-Ville, also known as Gare Centrale, is the main railway station in the city of Mulhouse, Haut-Rhin, France. It is the eastern terminus of the Paris-Est–Mulhouse-Ville railway.

== Station infrastructure ==
The station is a major thoroughfare on the SNCF network as it is the second busiest in the Alsace region after Strasbourg-Ville.

== History ==
The current station was built in the years 1928–1932 and rebuilt until 1955, after sustaining heavy damage in 1944, during World War II; it was restored again in 2006, in anticipation of the TGV. Mulhouse's first railway station had been opened in 1839

== Services ==
Mulhouse-Ville station is connected to the LGV Rhin-Rhône high speed line, offering TGV services towards Besançon, Dijon, Paris and southern France. Regional and local services are offered by TER Grand Est and one service of Basel S-Bahn and DB Regio, respectively. Destinations include:

- Basel
- Belfort
- Colmar
- Frankfurt
- Kruth
- Luxembourg
- Lyon
- Marseille
- Montpellier
- Nice
- Paris Lyon
- Strasbourg
- Zurich

=== Intermodality ===
A tram stop on the forecourt of the station serves as the terminus of lines 1 and 3 of the Mulhouse tramway, as well as the tram-train service to Thann. The outer section of this tram-train line shares its tracks with the SNCF service from inside the station to Kruth.
