= LGV Rhin-Rhône =

French high-speed railway

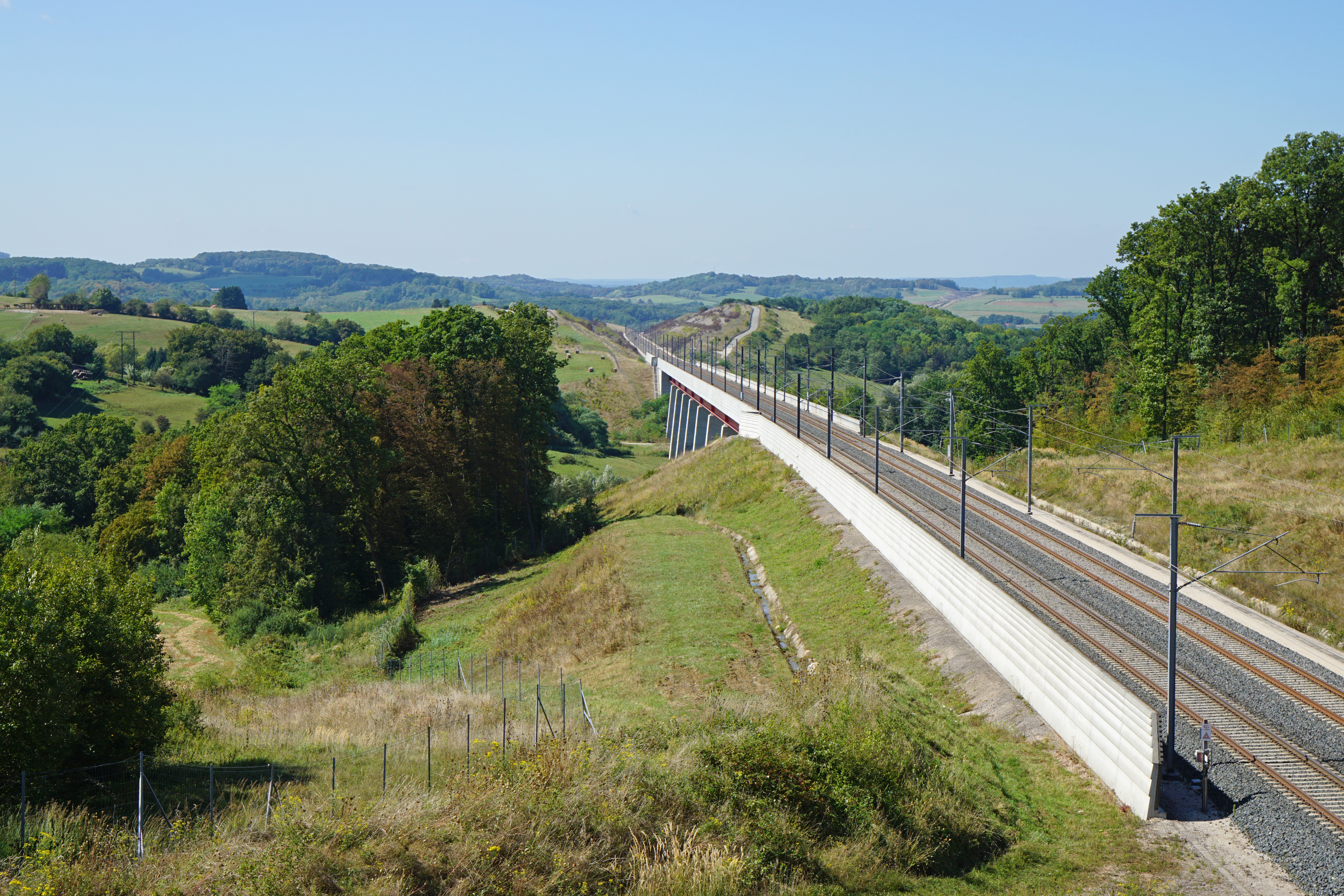
- View of the line in Saulnot

Overview
- Status: Operational, partly projected
- Owner: SNCF Réseau
- Locale: Bourgogne-Franche-Comté, France
- Termini: Petit-Croix; Villers-les-Pots
- Stations: Besançon Franche-Comté; Belfort – Montbéliard

Service
- Type: High-speed rail
- Operator: SNCF
- Rolling stock: TGV Duplex; TGV Sud-Est; TGV Réseau; TGV POS

History
- Opened: 11 December 2011

Technical
- Line length: 140 km (87 mi)
- Num of tracks: Double track
- Track gauge: 1,435 mm (4 ft 8 1/2 in) standard gauge
- Electrification: 25 kV 50 Hz
- Operating speed: 320 km/h (200 mph)
- Signalling: TVM 430, ETCS Level 2(future)

The LGV Rhin-Rhône (French: Ligne à Grande Vitesse; English: high-speed line) is a French high-speed rail line, the first in France to be presented as an inter-regional route rather than a link from the provinces to Paris, though it actually is used by some trains to/from Paris.

The completed section, referred to as the first phase of the eastern branch, is 140 km (87 mi) long, running from Villers-les-Pots, Côte-d'Or (east of Dijon) to Petit-Croix, Territoire de Belfort (east of Belfort). This section opened for service on 11 December 2011.

== Projected extensions ==
If the initial plan were to be completed, LGV Rhin-Rhône would have three branches:

- The second phase of the Eastern branch, 190 km (120 mi) from Genlis, near Dijon to Lutterbach, near Mulhouse, of which 140 km (87 mi) have been built
- The Western branch, crossing Dijon, joining the LGV Sud-Est near Montbard and making the line a connection between Dijon and Paris
- The Southern branch, from Dijon to Lyon

The construction of the latter two branches and of the second phase of the Eastern branch were not funded.

Running north–south, the Southern branch line would help connect Germany, the north of Switzerland, and eastern France on the one hand with the valleys of the Saône, Rhône, the Mediterranean arc and finally Catalonia on the other. The east–west Eastern and Western branches lines would help connect on the one hand London, Brussels, Lille and Île-de-France (i.e., Paris and surroundings) with Burgundy, Franche-Comté, south Alsace, southern Baden, and Switzerland on the other.

A connection would be built at Perrigny, south of Dijon, to serve TGV and freight trains. Besançon Franche-Comté TGV station, located in Les Auxons would be connected to Besançon-Viotte station by a railway line which could be also used for commuter trains.

It was projected that 12 million passengers per year would use the LGV Rhine-Rhône service.

LGV Rhin-Rhône schema

=== Second phase of the Eastern branch ===
The second phase of the Eastern branch, for which construction was initially planned to begin in 2014 but is still not funded, would add 50 km (31 mi) length to the line. This section would complete the eastern branch from Villers-les-Pots to Dijon, Côte-d'Or, with 15 km (9.3 mi) in the west, and from Petit-Croix to Mulhouse, Haut-Rhin, with 35 km (22 mi) in the east.

=== Western branch ===
A western branch would consist of the crossing of Dijon, where a new station would be built, the connection to the Paris-Marseille line near Montbard and the connection with the LGV Sud-Est at the Pasilly-Aisy junction. This branch would speed up connections with the Île-de-France region.

=== Southern branch ===
In 2009, the regional planning procedure for the 150 km (93 mi) long south branch was launched. Seven routes were put up for discussion by the developer Réseau ferré de France, who favoured a route parallel to the A 39 motorway, at an estimated cost of €3 billion.

== History ==
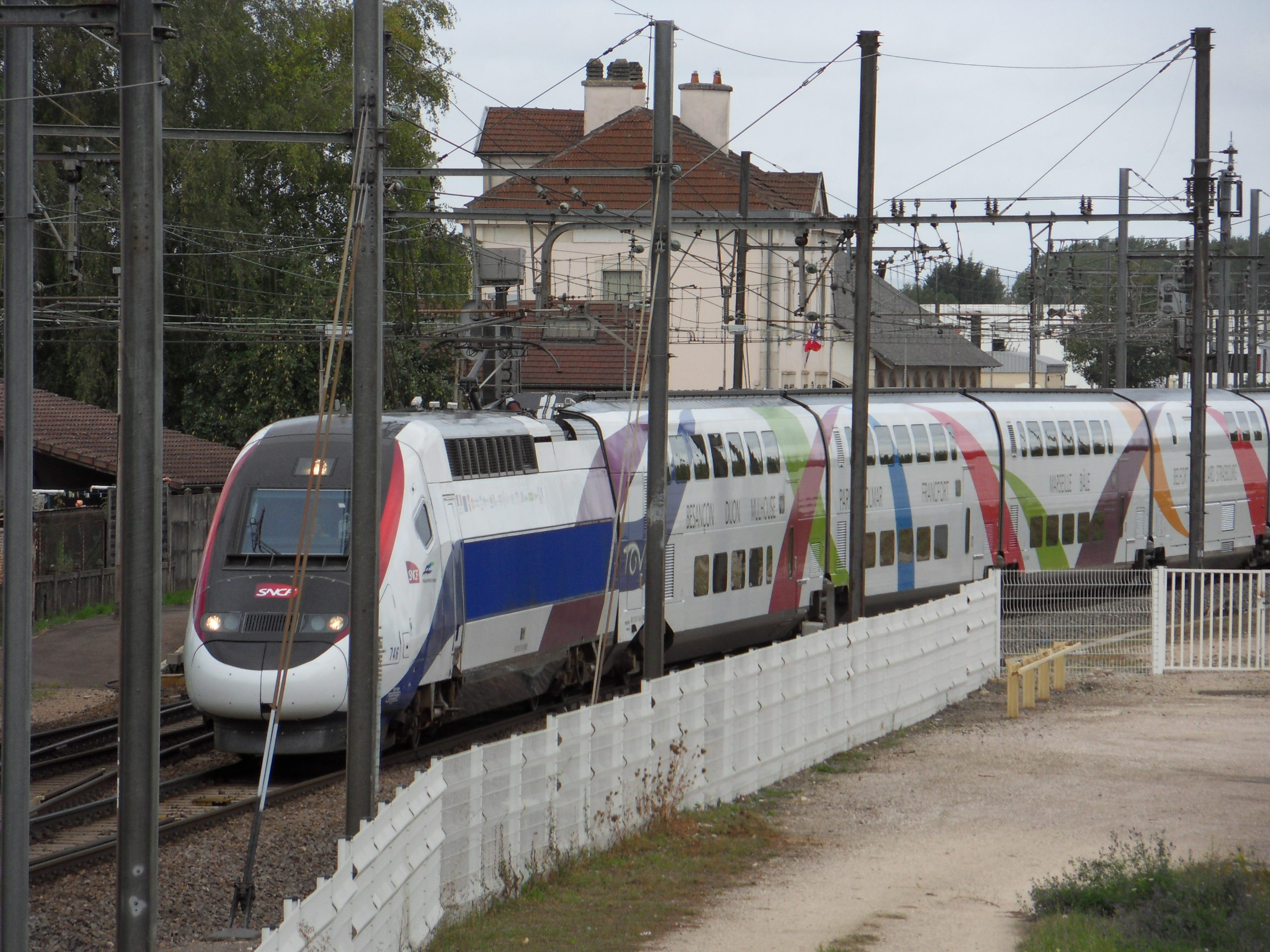
Inaugural train with President Nicolas Sarkozy on board on the first stretch of the LGV Rhin-Rhône, 8 September 2011, near Genlis

The first phase of the eastern branch runs 140 km (87 mi) of the 190 km (120 mi) planned length, connecting Villers-les-Pots (east of Dijon) to Petit-Croix (southeast of Belfort), was officially opened by President Nicolas Sarkozy on 8 September 2011, with passenger services starting on 11 December 2011.

The eastern branch is used by TGV trains operated by SNCF. It was to become a key link in both the north–south and east–west transport corridors. The line carries regional, national, and intra-European traffic. Mulhouse provides connection to Basel, Switzerland, and then to southwestern Germany and north-western Switzerland.

=== Finance ===
The financing agreement for the first phase of the eastern branch was signed on 28 February 2006. The estimated cost of the first section of the eastern branch is 2.312 billion euros, shared between many organisations.

The largest contributors of funds were the Government of France (€751 million), the maintainer of the French rail network RFF (€642 million) and the European Union (€200 million). Significant funding also came from the three regions of France that the line travels through: Franche-Comté (€316 million), Alsace (€206 million) and Burgundy (€131 million). A further €66 million was funded by the Government of Switzerland.

=== Construction ===
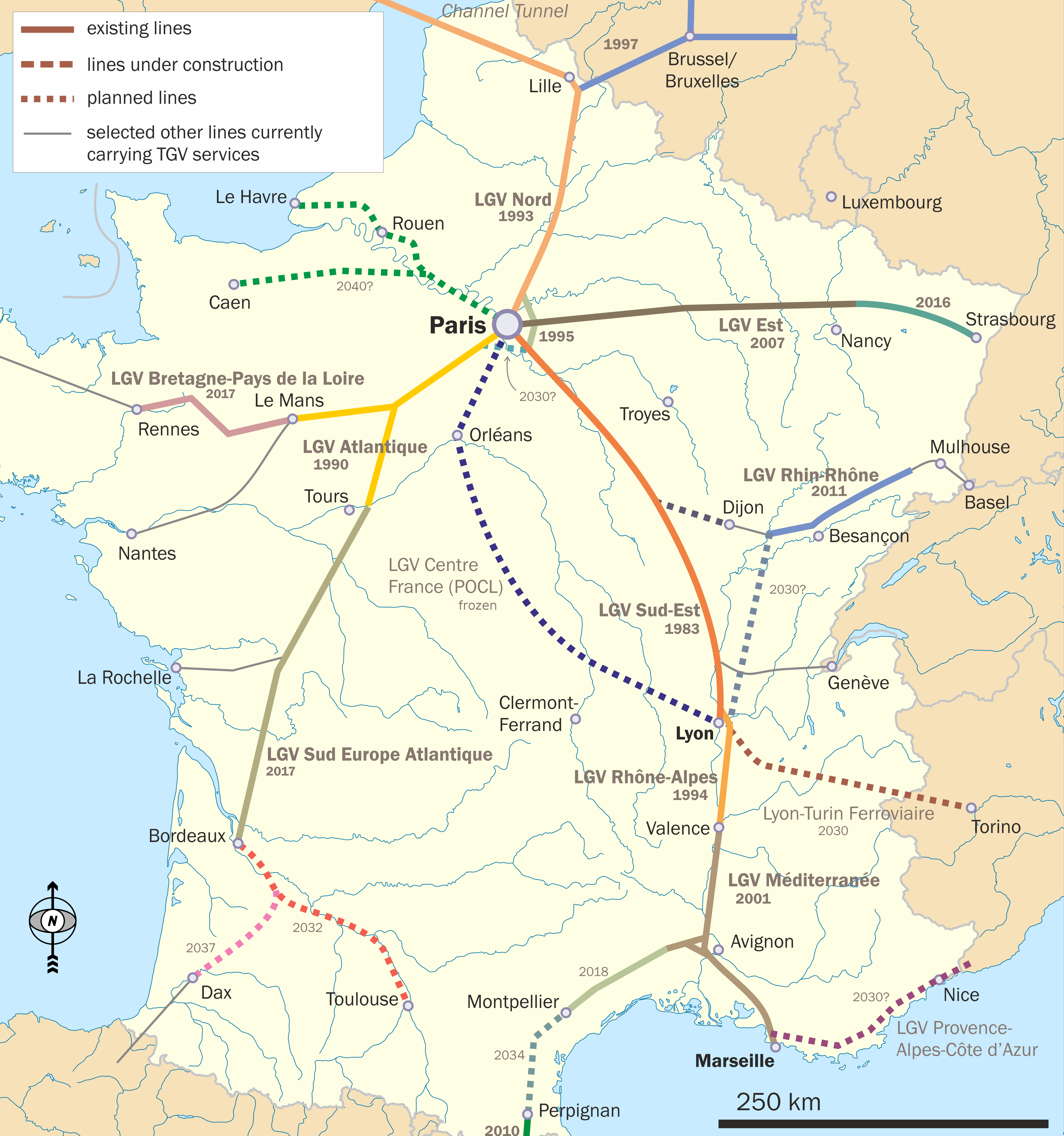
Map of France showing LGVs. LGV Rhin-Rhône is shown in shades of blue, south-east of Paris.

Preparatory works began in 2005, and construction officially started on 3 July 2006 with a ceremony in Les Magny, Haute-Saône. Actual construction of the first section started north of Besançon on 7 August 2006.

Réseau Ferré de France appointed French engineering and consulting companies Setec and Egis to build the line.

=== Journey times ===
Upon completion of the first section of the eastern branch, best journey time are:

from	to	before	after
Dijon	Strasbourg	3h25	2h00
Dijon	Frankfurt	6h30	3h40
Besançon	Marseille	4h15	4h00
Belfort-Montbéliard TGV	Paris	3h25 from Belfort; 3h40 from Montbéliard	2h25
Strasbourg	Lyon	4h45	3h35

== See also ==
- High-speed rail
- TGV
- Intercity-Express
