= TER Bourgogne-Franche-Comté =

Regional transport network in France

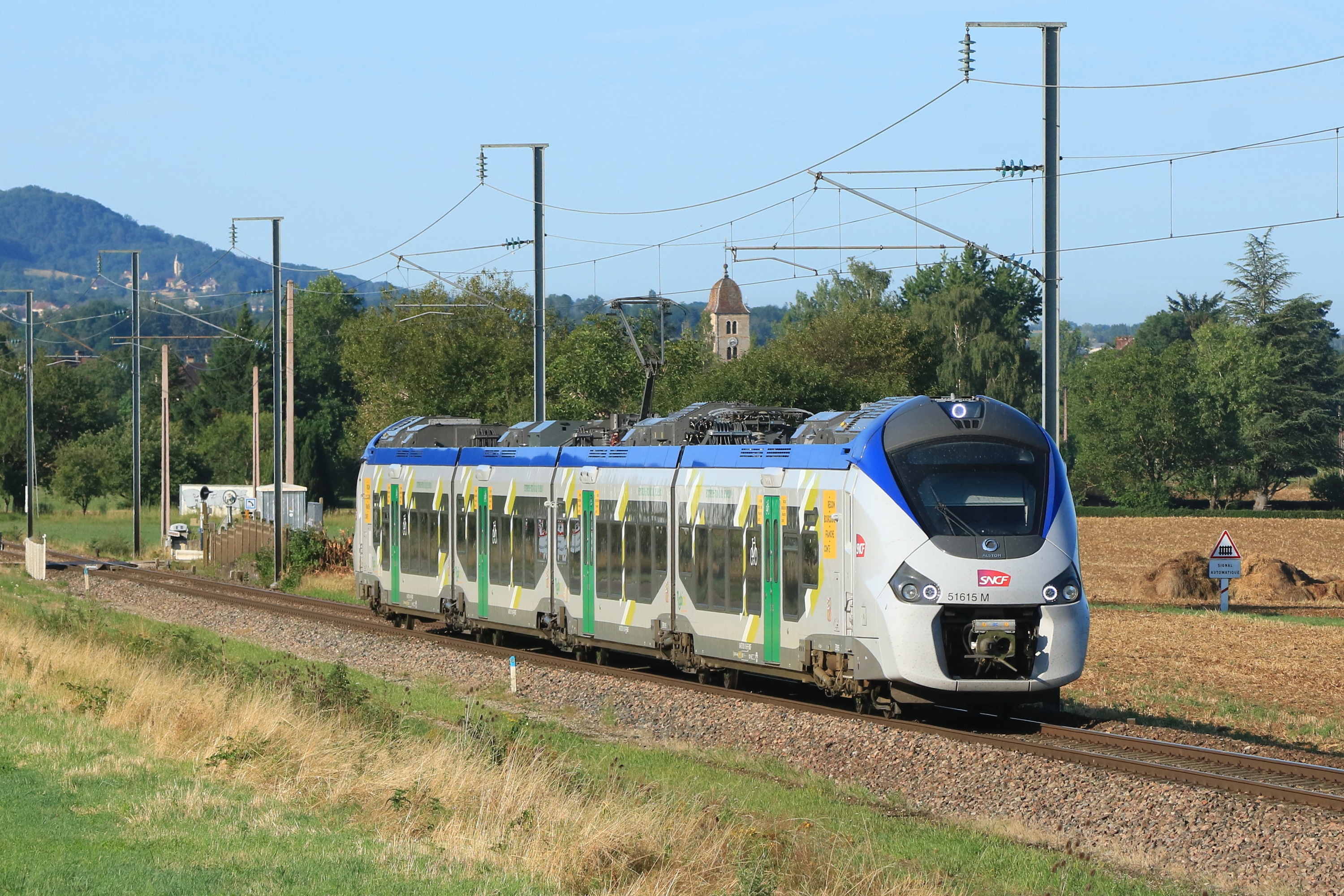
- Régiolis in TER Bourgogne-Franche-Comté livery.

Overview
- Owner: SNCF
- Area served: Bourgogne-Franche-Comté, France
- Daily ridership: 70,000 (up to 80,000 on fridays)
- Website: ter.sncf.com/bourgogne-franche-comte

Operation
- Began operation: 2017
- Operator: SNCF

Technical
- Track gauge: 1,435 mm (4 ft 8 1/2 in) standard gauge

TER Bourgogne-Franche-Comté is the regional rail network serving the region of Bourgogne-Franche-Comté in eastern France. It is operated by the French national railway company SNCF. It was formed in 2017 from the previous TER networks TER Bourgogne and TER Franche-Comté, after the respective regions were merged.

== Network ==
The rail and bus network as of April 2022:

Rail transport infrastructure map of Bourgogne-Franche-Comté, showing main stations, number of tracks, power source and maximum speed.

=== Rail ===
Line	Route
Belfort – Delle	Belfort ... Delle
Belfort – Épinal	Belfort ... Lure ... Épinal (see TER Grand Est line L5 for details)
Belfort – Vesoul	Belfort ... Lure – Vesoul
Besançon – Belfort	Besançon-Viotte ... Montbéliard ... Belfort
Besançon – Besançon TGV	Besançon-Viotte – École-Valentin – Besançon Franche-Comté TGV
Besançon – Bourg-en-Bresse	Besançon-Viotte ... Mouchard ... Lons-le-Saunier ... Bourg-en-Bresse
Besançon – La Chaux-de-Fonds	Besançon-Viotte ... Le Valdahon ... Morteau ... (Switzerland) La Chaux-de-Fonds
Chalon-sur-Saône – Montchanin	Chalon-sur-Saône ... Montchanin
Dijon – Auxerre	Dijon ... Montbard ... Laroche-Migennes ... Auxerre
Dijon – Besançon	Dijon ... Dole-Ville ... Besançon-Viotte
Dijon – Bourg-en-Bresse	Dijon ... Saint-Jean-de-Losne ... Louhans – Saint-Amour – Bourg-en-Bresse
Dijon – Is-sur-Tille	Dijon ... Is-sur-Tille
Dijon – Lyon	Dijon ... Beaune ... Chalon-sur-Saône ... Mâcon-Ville ... Villefranche-sur-Saône ... Lyon-Part-Dieu
Dijon – Nevers	Dijon – Beaune – Montchanin ... Étang-sur-Arroux ... Decize ... Nevers
Dole – Pontarlier	Dole-Ville ... Mouchard – Andelot ... Frasne ... Pontarlier
Laroche – Corbigny	Laroche-Migennes – Auxerre ... Cravant-Bazarnes ... Clamecy ... Corbigny
Mouchard – Saint-Claude	Mouchard – Andelot ... Champagnole ... Morez ... Saint-Claude
Moulins – Dijon	Moulins-sur-Allier ... Paray-le-Monial ... Montchanin - Beaune - Dijon
Nevers – Clermont-Ferrand	Nevers ... Moulins-sur-Allier ... Vichy ... Clermont-Ferrand (see TER Auvergne-Rhône-Alpes line 14 for details)
Nevers – Cosne-sur-Loire	Nevers-le-Banlay ... Nevers ... La Charité ... Cosne-sur-Loire
Nevers – Lyon	Nevers ... Moulins-sur-Allier ... Paray-le-Monial ... Lamure-sur-Azergues ... Lozanne ... Lyon-Perrache
Paris – Avallon	Paris-Bercy – Sens ... Laroche-Migennes – Auxerre ... Avallon
Paris – Dijon	Paris-Bercy – Sens ... Laroche-Migennes ... Tonnerre ... Montbard – Les Laumes-Alésia – Dijon-Ville
Paris – Laroche-Migennes	Paris-Lyon – Melun ... Montereau ... Sens ... Laroche-Migennes
Pontarlier – Vallorbe	Pontarlier – Frasne – Labergement-Sainte-Marie – (Switzerland) Vallorbe

=== Bus ===
- Autun – Avallon
- Autun – Chagny
- Châtillon-sur-Seine – Montbard
- Dole – Lons-le-Saunier
- Étang-sur-Arroux – Autun
- Gray – Culmont-Chalindrey
- Mouchard – Salins-les-Bains
- Vesoul – Culmont-Chalindrey
- Vesoul – Gray
- Vesoul – Luxeuil-les-Bains

== See also ==
- Réseau Ferré de France
- List of SNCF stations in Bourgogne-Franche-Comté
