= Villers-les-Pots station =

Railway station in Villers-les-Pots, France

Villers-les-Pots
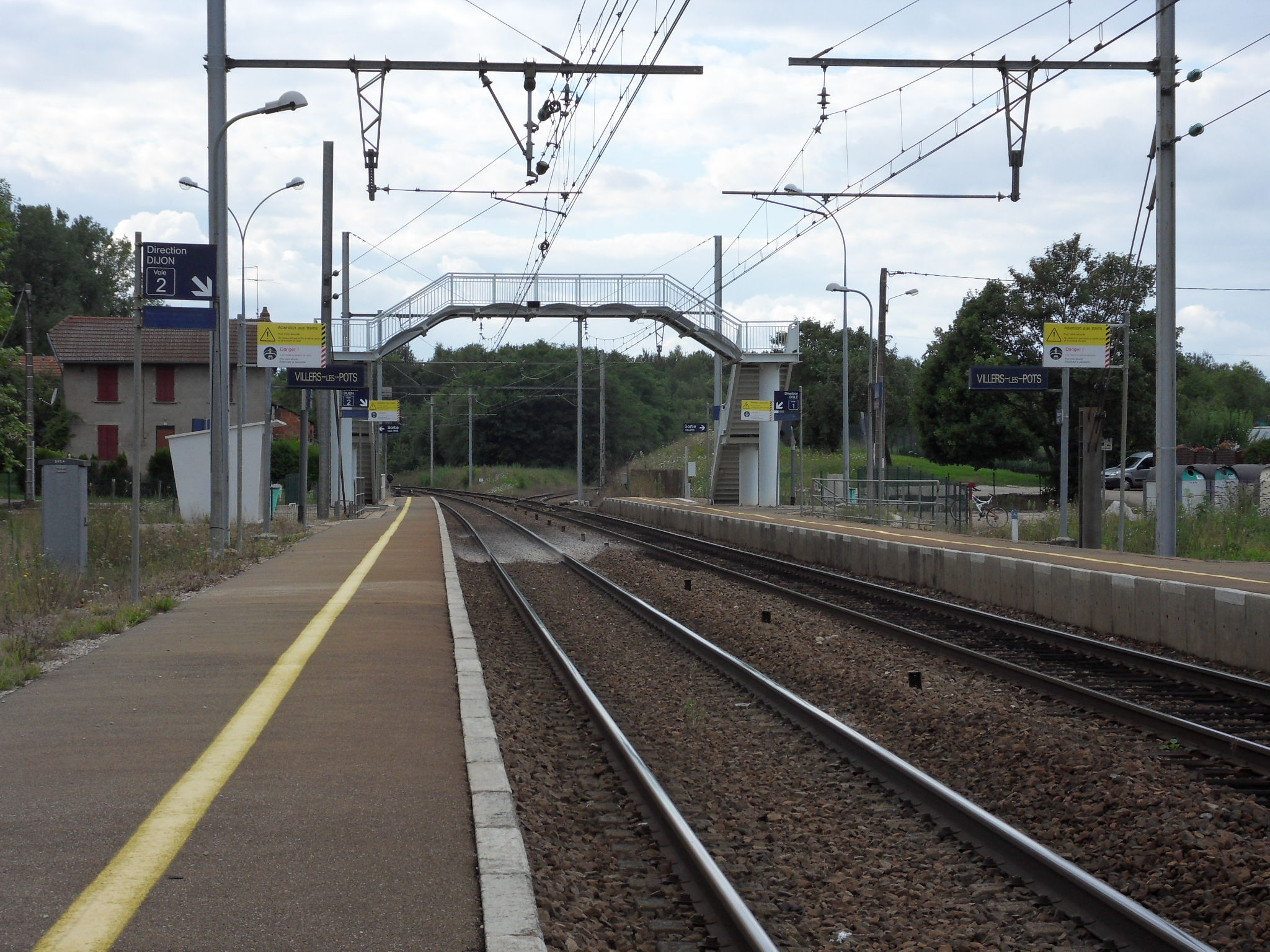
- The station platforms in 2010

General information
- Location: Villers-les-Pots; France
- Coordinates: 47°12′24″N 5°20′52″E
- Owner: SNCF
- Line: Dijon–Vallorbe line
- Distance: 343.4 km (213.4 mi) from Paris-Lyon
- Train operators: SNCF

Other information
- Station code: 87713339

Passengers
- 2018: 1,361

Services
Preceding station	TER Bourgogne-Franche-Comté	Following station
Collonges towards Dijon	TER	Auxonne towards Besançon
Location

Villers-les-Pots station (French: Gare de Villers-les-Pots) is a railway station in the commune of Villers-les-Pots, in the French department of Côte-d'Or, in the Bourgogne-Franche-Comté region. It is an intermediate stop on the Dijon–Vallorbe line of SNCF.

== Services ==
The following services stop at Villers-les-Pots:

- TER Bourgogne-Franche-Comté: regional service between Dijon-Ville and Besançon-Viotte.
