= Paul Chrétien =

French World War I general

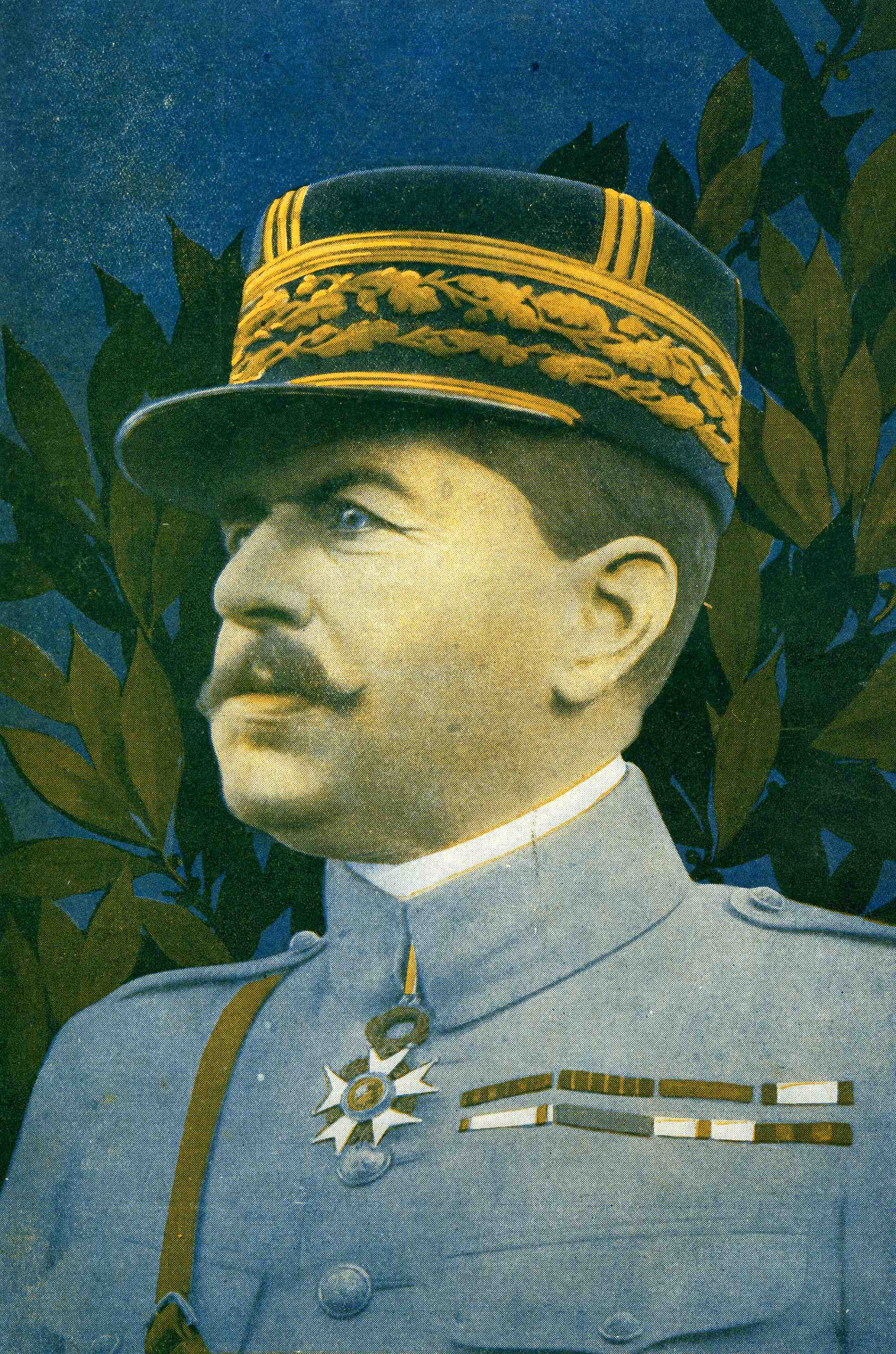
- Born: September 12, 1862; Auxonne, Côte-d'Or, France
- Died: May 6, 1948 (aged 85); Harcourt, Eure, France
- Burial place: Fontainebleau Cemetery, Fontainebleau, Seine-et-Marne, France
- Education: École spéciale militaire de Saint-Cyr
- Military career
- Allegiance: France
- Branch: French Army
- Service years: 1883 – 1921
- Rank: Divisional general
- Conflicts: Sino-French War; World War I: Western Front; Battle of the Somme; Battle of Verdun

Adrien Paul Alexandre Chrétien was a French general who participated in World War I. He spent the war commanding the 30th Army Corps at throughout several battles of the Western Front.

== Biography ==
Born in Auxonne, Côte-d'Or on September 12, 1862, he graduated from the École spéciale militaire de Saint-Cyr in 1883 as a second lieutenant in the 1st Algerian Tirailleurs Regiment.

In 1892, he was a captain in the 3rd Algerian Tirailleurs Regiment. When World War I broke out, he was a colonel, but from October 19, 1914, he was given the interim command of an infantry brigade. On December 18, 1914, he was appointed brigadier general, then promoted to division general on December 23, 1915. He commanded the 30th Army Corps on January 19, 1916. On January 26, he alerted the high command to the deplorable state of the defenses in the Battle of Verdun.

Chrétien was wounded twice, first disfigured by a bullet which hit him in the right ear during the Tonkin Campaign, then hit in the knee on September 6, 1914. General Chrétien was made Commander of the Legion of Honor on March 25, 1915.

In February 1916, when the Battle of Verdun broke out, he commanded the 30th Army Corps, whose headquarters was located at Fort Souville.

He after the war, he retired to Harcourt in 1921. In 1932, he became president of the Free Society of Agriculture, Sciences, Arts and Belles-Lettres of Eure as well as a member of the Société d'émulation des Côtes-d'Armor.

=== Personal life ===
He married Marié à Jeanne Woitier and had one son, Marcel Adrien who was born on February 28, 1898, but was killed in action on August 8, 1918, during World War I as a member of the 3rd Zouave Regiment.

== Awards ==
- Legion of Honor, Grand Officer (December 10, 1921)
  - Commander on March 25, 1915
  - Officer on December 30, 1906
  - Knight on July 5, 1887
- Croix de guerre 1914–1918 (1 Palm)
- Tonkin Expedition commemorative medal
- 1914–1918 Inter-Allied Victory medal
- 1914–1918 Commemorative war medal

=== Foreign Awards ===
- Belgium: Croix de guerre
- Italy: Order of the Crown of Italy, Grand crown and grand cross
- Italy: War Merit Cross
- United Kingdom: Order of the Bath, Knight Commander
- Tunisia: Nichan Iftikhar (July 28, 1900)
