= Claude Antoine, comte Prieur-Duvernois =

French engineer and politician (1763–1832)

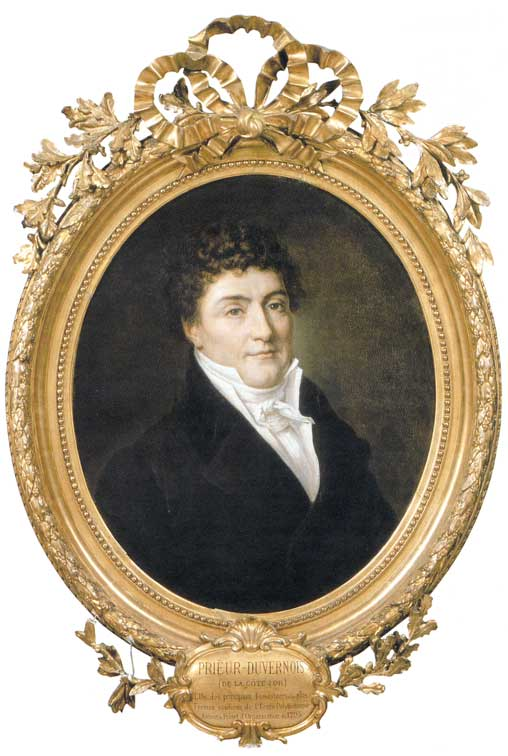
- Portrait by Emile Giroux

43rd President of the National Convention
- In office 20 May – 4 June 1794
- Preceded by: Lazare Carnot
- Succeeded by: Maximilien Robespierre

Personal details
- Born: 22 December 1763 Auxonne, Côte-d'Or, Kingdom of France
- Died: 11 August 1832 (aged 68)
- Party: The Mountain
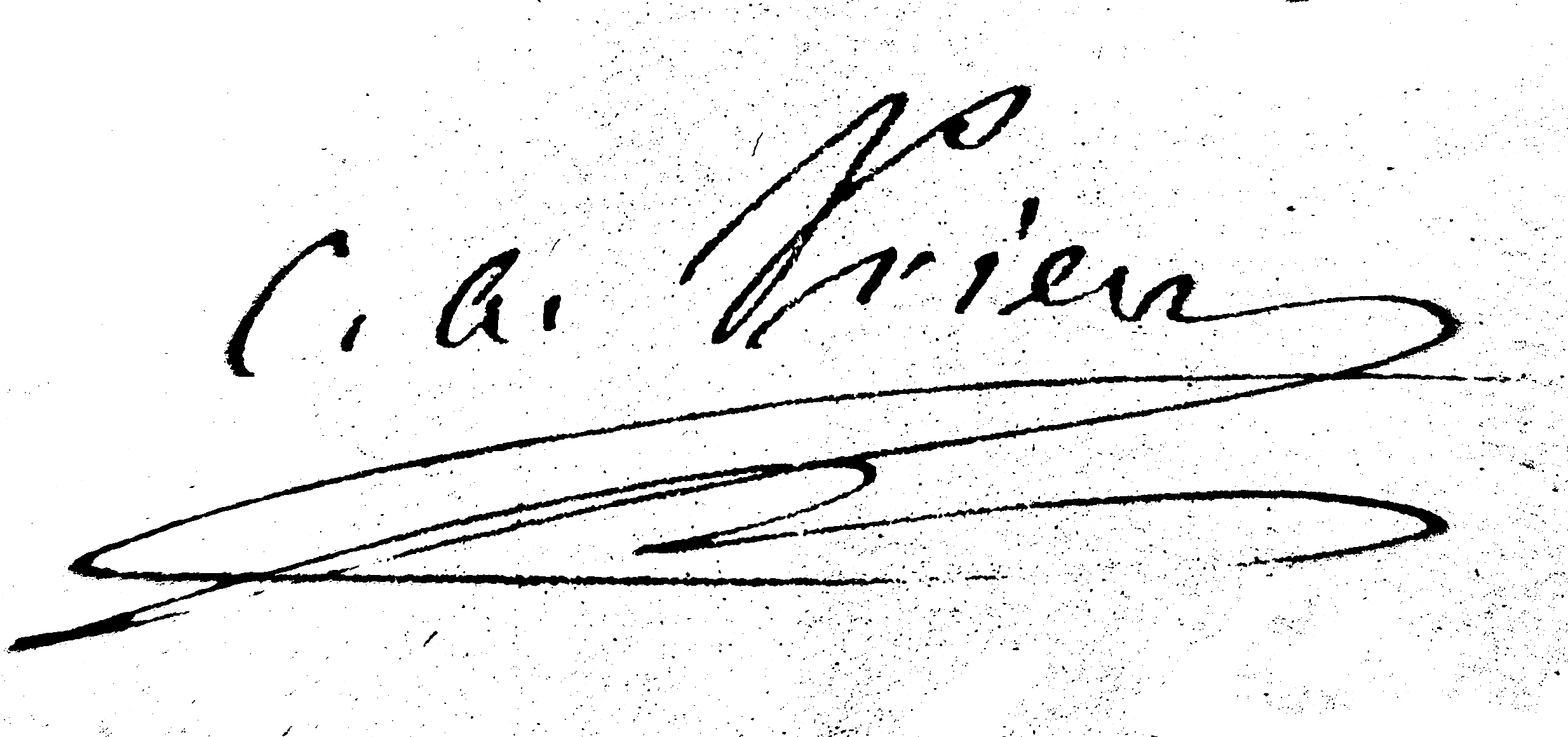
- Signature

Claude Antoine, comte Prieur-Duvernois (1763–1832), commonly known as Prieur de la Côte-d'Or after his native département, was a French engineer and a politician during and after the French Revolution.

== Life ==
=== Early life and revolutionary beginnings ===
Born in Auxonne, Côte-d'Or. As an officer of engineers, he presented to the National Constituent Assembly in 1790 a Mémoire on the standardization of weights and measures.

In 1791, the Côte-d'Or re-elected him to the Legislative Assembly, and in 1792 to the National Convention. In 1792, Prieur-Duvernois was sent on a mission to the Army of the Rhine to announce the deposition of King Louis XVI, after having voted in favor of his execution.

In 1793 he served as a representative on mission to survey the ports of Lorient and Dunkirk. He was arrested in Normandy after the fall of the Girondists (June 1793) by the rebel authorities of Caen. He was released in July 1793 after the defeat of their forces at Vernon.

=== Committee of Public Safety ===
On 14 August 1793, he became a member of the Committee of Public Safety, where he allied himself with Lazare Carnot in the organization of national defence. His role included providing munitions for the troops engaged in the French Revolutionary Wars. Prieur worked closely with prominent scientists in France. The Committee worked with several notable French scientists, including Lagrange, Lamarck, and Vandermonde. Prieur and Carnot advocated the use of observation balloons in war after some experiments in Meudon. This led to their deployment at the Battle of Fleurus.

With Carnot, Prieur aligned with the Reign of Terror, and voted in favor of Georges Danton's execution. As the Committee collapsed, Prieur aligned with Carnot and Lindet, the two other specialists in the committee.

Prieur retained his seat after the Thermidorian Reaction. He avoided capture in the riots of Prairial Insurrection (20 May 1795), and was subsequently spared the attacks of moderates in the Thermidorian Convention.

=== Directory and Empire ===
Under the Directory, Prieur sat in the Council of Five Hundred until Napoleon Bonaparte's 18 Brumaire coup (9 November 1799). In 1808 he was created a count of the Empire, and in 1811 he retired from the army with the grade of chef de brigade (the equivalent of colonel).

Prieur-Duvernois was one of the founders of the École Polytechnique. In this role, he helped to establish the Institut de France, to adopt the metric system, and to found the Bureau des Longitudes. Prieur died in Dijon.
