= Auxonne station =

Railway station in Auxonne, France

Auxonne
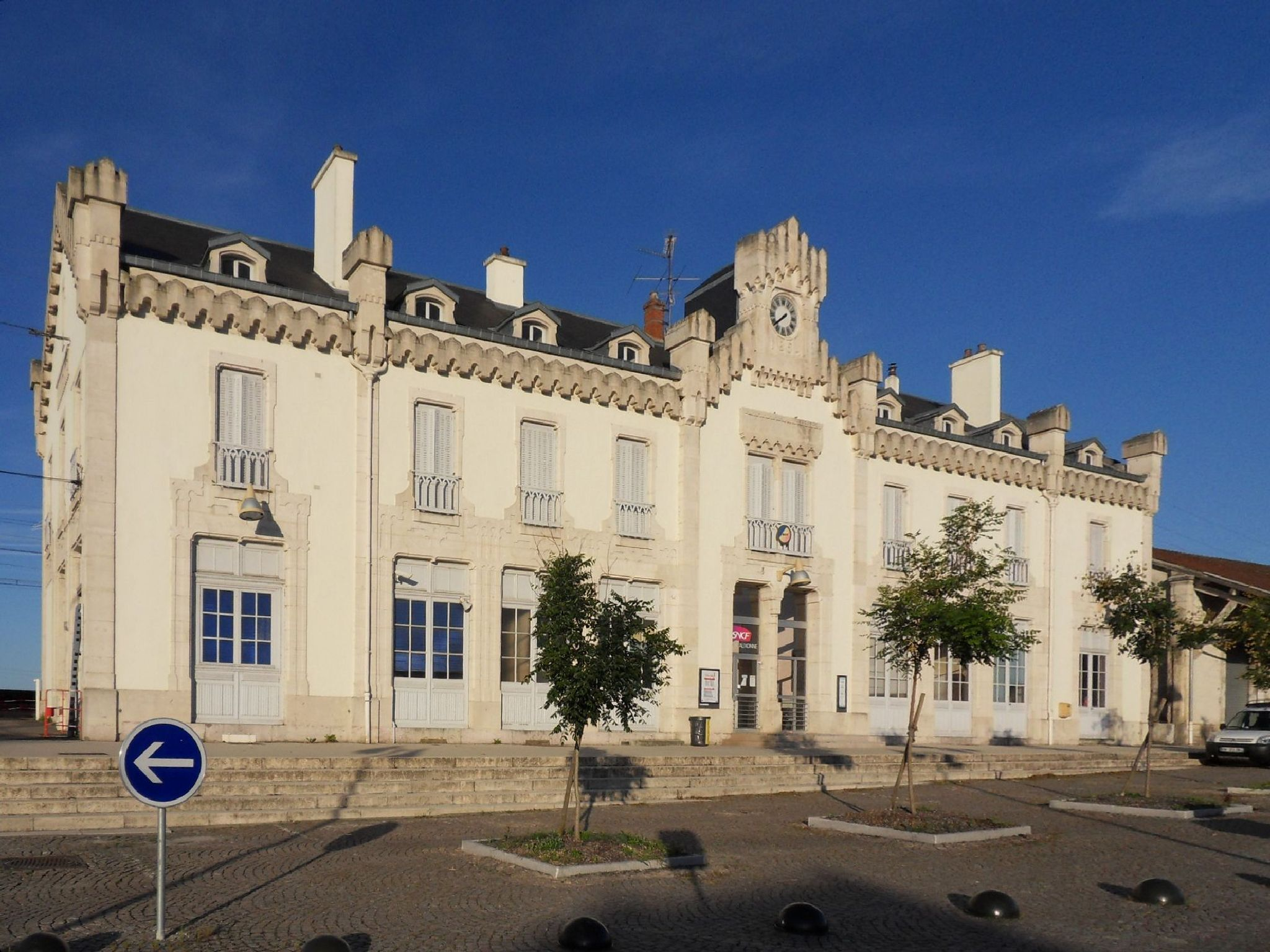
- The station building in 2012

General information
- Location: Auxonne; France
- Coordinates: 47°11′34″N 5°22′39″E
- Owner: SNCF
- Line: Dijon–Vallorbe line
- Distance: 346.1 km (215.1 mi) from Paris-Lyon
- Train operators: SNCF

Other information
- Station code: 87713347

Passengers
- 2018: 270,708

Services
Preceding station	TER Bourgogne-Franche-Comté	Following station
Villers-les-Pots towards Dijon	TER	Dole-Ville towards Besançon
Location

Auxonne station (French: Gare d'Auxonne) is a railway station in the commune of Auxonne, in the French department of Côte-d'Or, in the Bourgogne-Franche-Comté region. It is an intermediate stop on the Dijon–Vallorbe line of SNCF.

== Services ==
The following services stop at Auxonne:

- TER Bourgogne-Franche-Comté: regional service between Dijon-Ville and Besançon-Viotte.
