= Moissey =

Commune in Bourgogne-Franche-Comté, France

- Commune
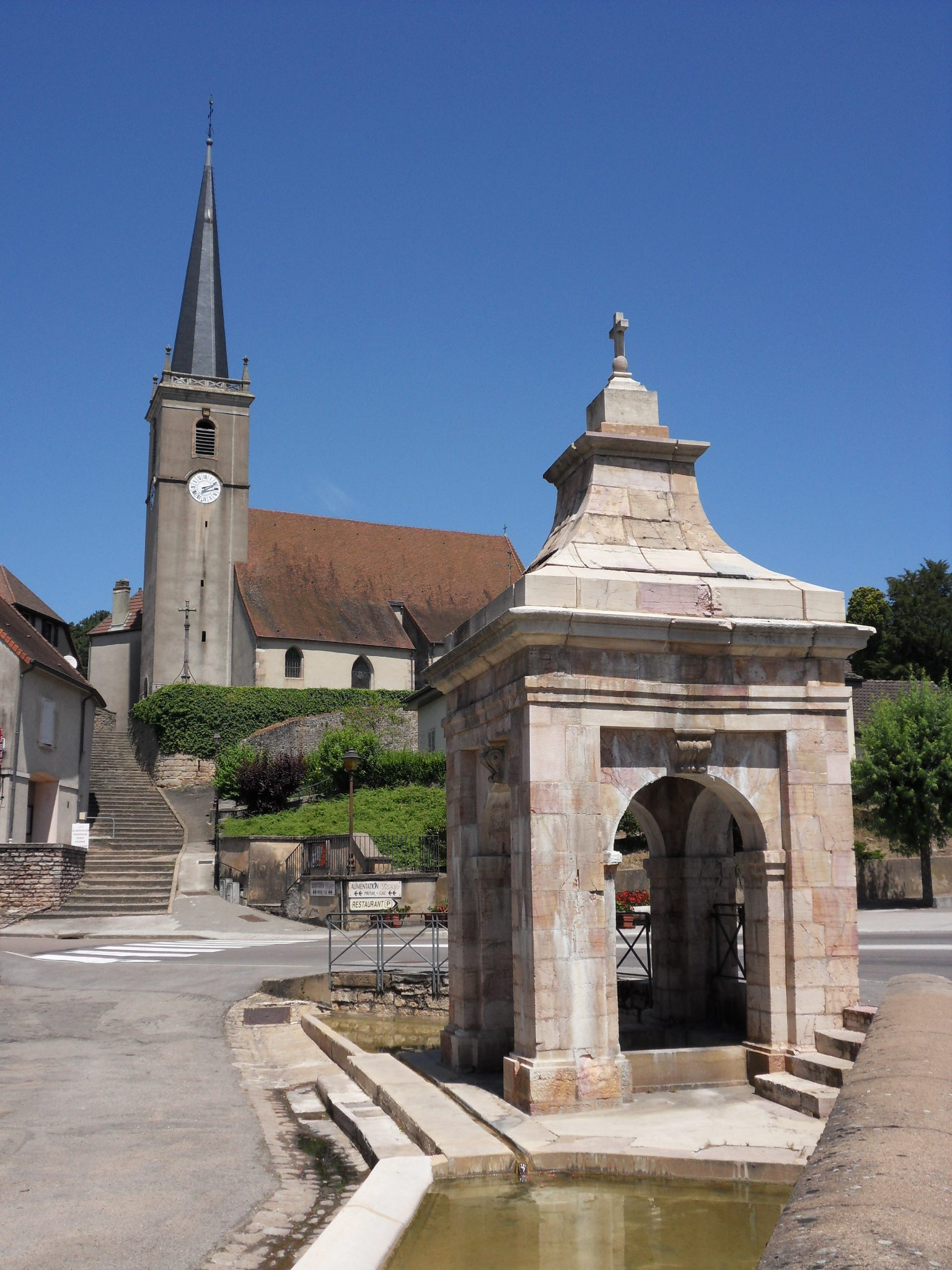
- The church in Moissey

- Coat of arms
- Location of Moissey
- Location within France Location within Bourgogne-Franche-Comté
- Coordinates: 47°11′52″N 5°31′28″E
- Country: France
- Region: Bourgogne-Franche-Comté
- Department: Jura
- Arrondissement: Dole
- Canton: Authume
- Intercommunality: CA Grand Dole

Government
  - Mayor (2020–2026): Dominique Troncin
- Area^{1}: 10.63 km^{2} (4.10 sq mi)
- Highest elevation: 377 m (1,237 ft)
- Lowest elevation: 217 m (712 ft)
- Population (2023): 567
  - Density: 53.3/km^{2} (138/sq mi)
- Time zone: UTC+01:00 (CET)
  - Summer (DST): UTC+02:00 (CEST)
- INSEE/Postal code: 39335 /39290
- ^{1} French Land Register data, which excludes lakes, ponds, glaciers > 1 km^{2} (0.386 sq mi or 247 acres) and river estuaries.

Moissey (French pronunciation: [mwasɛ]) is a commune in the Jura department in Bourgogne-Franche-Comté in eastern France.

== Population ==
Historical population
Year	Pop.	±% p.a.
1968	340	—
1975	346	+0.25%
1982	381	+1.39%
1990	426	+1.41%
1999	527	+2.39%
2007	561	+0.78%
2012	546	−0.54%
2017	563	+0.62%
2023	567	+0.12%
Source: INSEE

== See also ==
- Communes of the Jura department
