= Villers-les-Pots =

- Commune
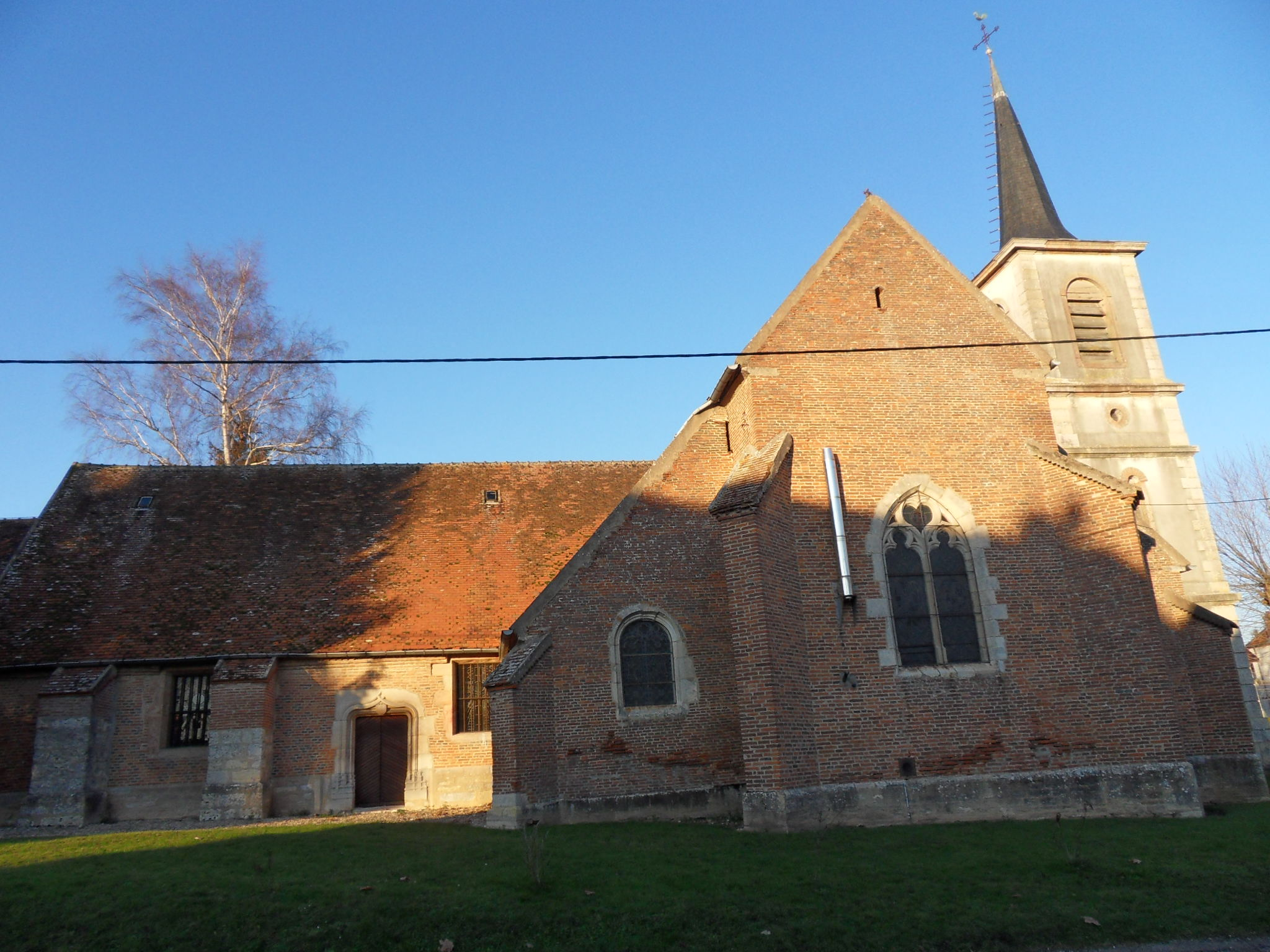
- The church in Villers-les-Pots

- Coat of arms
- Location of Villers-les-Pots
- Location within France Location within Bourgogne-Franche-Comté
- Coordinates: 47°12′42″N 5°21′17″E
- Country: France
- Region: Bourgogne-Franche-Comté
- Department: Côte-d'Or
- Arrondissement: Dijon
- Canton: Auxonne

Government
  - Mayor (2020–2026): Cédric Vautier
- Area^{1}: 10.43 km^{2} (4.03 sq mi)
- Elevation: 196 m (643 ft)
- Highest elevation: 205 m (673 ft)
- Lowest elevation: 182 m (597 ft)
- Population (2023): 1,220
  - Density: 117/km^{2} (303/sq mi)
- Time zone: UTC+01:00 (CET)
  - Summer (DST): UTC+02:00 (CEST)
- INSEE/Postal code: 21699 /21130
- ^{1} French Land Register data, which excludes lakes, ponds, glaciers > 1 km^{2} (0.386 sq mi or 247 acres) and river estuaries.

Villers-les-Pots (French pronunciation: [vilɛʁ le po]) is a commune in the Côte-d'Or department in eastern France.

== Population ==
Historical population
Year	Pop.	±% p.a.
1968	731	—
1975	790	+1.12%
1982	763	−0.50%
1990	855	+1.43%
1999	871	+0.21%
2007	1,016	+1.94%
2012	1,054	+0.74%
2017	1,134	+1.47%
2023	1,220	+1.23%
Source: INSEE

== Transportation ==
The commune has a railway station, Villers-les-Pots, on the Dijon–Vallorbe line.

== See also ==
- Communes of the Côte-d'Or department
