= Arc-et-Senans =

- Commune
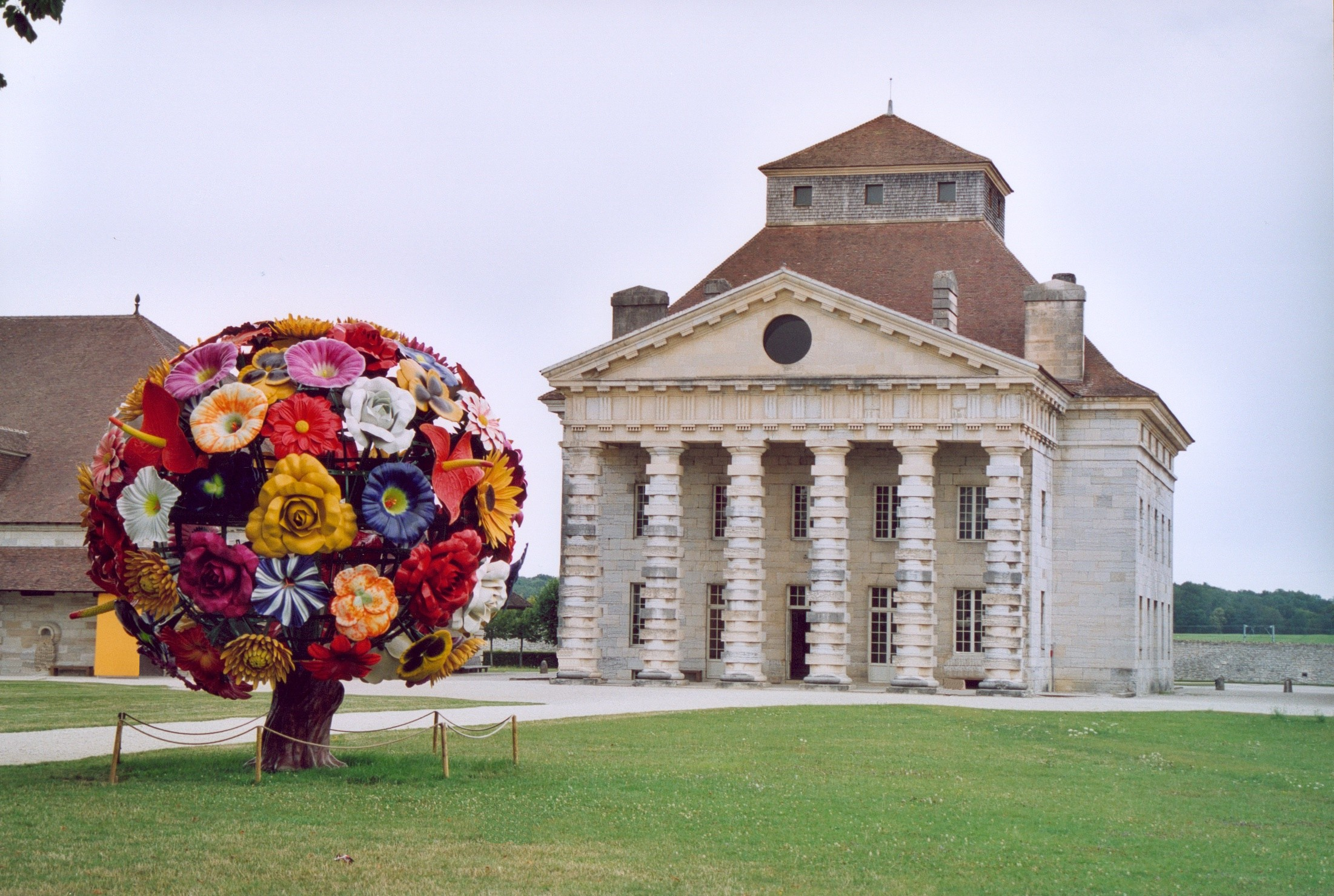
- Royal Saltworks

- Coat of arms
- Location of Arc-et-Senans
- Location within France Location within Bourgogne-Franche-Comté
- Coordinates: 47°01′59″N 5°46′45″E
- Country: France
- Region: Bourgogne-Franche-Comté
- Department: Doubs
- Arrondissement: Besançon
- Canton: Saint-Vit
- Intercommunality: Loue-Lison

Government
  - Mayor (2020–2026): Jacques Maurice
- Area^{1}: 14.98 km^{2} (5.78 sq mi)
- Highest elevation: 292 m (958 ft)
- Lowest elevation: 226 m (741 ft)
- Population (2023): 1,620
  - Density: 108/km^{2} (280/sq mi)
- Time zone: UTC+01:00 (CET)
  - Summer (DST): UTC+02:00 (CEST)
- INSEE/Postal code: 25610 /39210
- ^{1} French Land Register data, which excludes lakes, ponds, glaciers > 1 km^{2} (0.386 sq mi or 247 acres) and river estuaries.

Arc-et-Senans (French pronunciation: [aʁk e sənɑ̃]) is a commune in the Doubs department in the Bourgogne-Franche-Comté region of eastern France.

The Royal Saltworks, a UNESCO World Heritage Site since 1982, is located here.

== Geography ==
Arc-et-Senans is a large commune located some 32 km south-west of Besançon and 30 km east by south-east of Dole. It lies between the Loue river in the south and the Chaux forest in the north at 250 metres altitude. The northern western, and southern borders of the commune are the departmental border between Doubs and Jura. Only the short north-eastern border connects the commune to Doubs. Access to the commune is by the D17 from Liesle in the north-east which passes through the town and continues west, changing to the D7 at the border, to Chissey-sur-Loue. The D31 comes from Rans in the north, changing to the D17E at the border, and continues south, changing again to the D32, to Cramans. The commune has several hamlets: Arc to the west of the main town and Senans to the north-east almost link into one town. Then there are also the hamlets of Le Defois and Le Vernois. There is an SNCF railway station at Arc-et-Senans town which is a junction for two lines and is served by the TER Franche-Comté. There are forests to the north but most of the commune is farmland.

The Loue river forms the southern and eastern border of the commune as it continues south to join the Doubs near Molay. The Ruisseau de la Reverotte flows from the north-east of the commune down the western side and forms part of the western border before continuing west to join the Loue east of Belmont.

== Toponymy ==
Arc-et-Senans was known as Petregium (Roche-sur-Loue) cited in the Chronicle by Saint-Benignus. It was Arcum in 1049, Sonans in 1275, Cenans et Arc en Valoye in 1490, and Arc en Vallois in 1681.

== History ==
Traces of occupation dating back to the Roman era have been found, especially at a place called Le Cretot. Bones with broken tiles and bricks were visible in the soil during excavation. Father Letondal in his book Arc-et-Senans through the ages (in French) published in 1927 tells a quite complete communal history.

=== Heraldry ===
Arms of Arc-et-Senans	Blazon: Quarterly, at 1 Gules a fleur-de-lis bendy; at 2 Or, 3 bunches of grapes Argent leaved in Vert and posed 2 and 1; at 3 Or, a chevron Sable between 3 doves Vert in flight; at 4 Gules, 3 falcons Or perched of Sable posed 2 and 1.

== Administration ==
List of Successive Mayors

From	To	Name
2001	2008	Jean Vaurs
2008	2026	Jacques Maurice

== Demography ==
Historical population

Year	Pop.	±% p.a.
1793	1,198	—
1800	1,428	+2.54%
1806	1,501	+0.83%
1821	1,410	−0.42%
1831	1,594	+1.23%
1836	1,657	+0.78%
1841	1,681	+0.29%
1846	1,605	−0.92%
1851	1,504	−1.29%
1856	1,491	−0.17%
1861	1,533	+0.56%
1866	1,528	−0.07%
1872	1,425	−1.16%
1876	1,354	−1.27%
1881	1,290	−0.96%
1886	1,312	+0.34%
1891	1,306	−0.09%
1896	1,229	−1.21%
1901	1,179	−0.83%

Year	Pop.	±% p.a.
1906	1,204	+0.42%
1911	1,179	−0.42%
1921	1,060	−1.06%
1926	1,200	+2.51%
1931	1,201	+0.02%
1936	1,268	+1.09%
1946	1,290	+0.17%
1954	1,247	−0.42%
1962	1,308	+0.60%
1968	1,236	−0.94%
1975	1,231	−0.06%
1982	1,303	+0.82%
1990	1,277	−0.25%
1999	1,364	+0.73%
2007	1,438	+0.66%
2012	1,537	+1.34%
2017	1,624	+1.11%
2023	1,620	−0.04%

Source: EHESS and INSEE

== Economy ==
The economic life of Arc-et-Senans is largely oriented towards tourism. The Royal Saltworks attracts 150,000 visitors per year (2000). In addition some small industry has developed, mainly in wood and to a lesser extent plastics. Finally there is still about a dozen farms which traditionally are oriented towards dairy cattle and grain farming.

== Culture and heritage ==
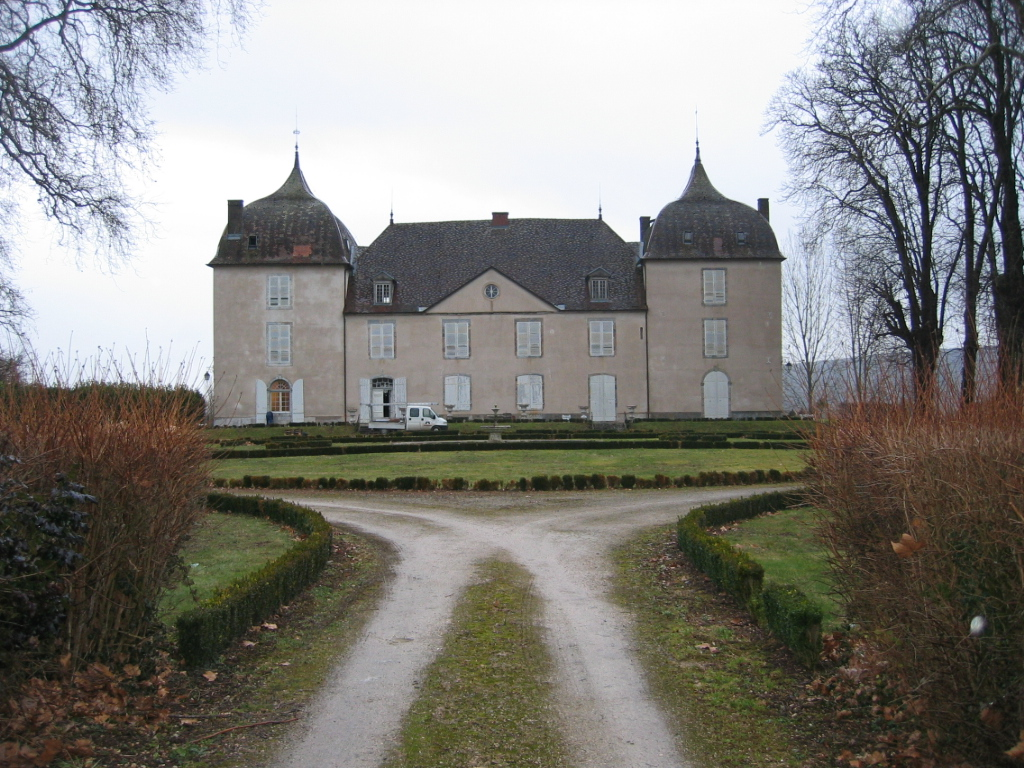
Château de Roche-sur-Loue

=== Civil heritage ===
The commune has a number of buildings and structures that are registered as historical monuments:

- The Chateau d'Arc (18th century) The Chateau d'Arc castle is more recent than the Chateau de Roche. It was built by Mr. Chaudois in 1751. The building is surrounded by a large park of three hectares protected by a surrounding wall. It has been an historical monument since 1984. There was a third fortified chateau in Arc – the Châtel-Rouillaud – but it burned down in 1638. Today there remains only the mound on which it was built.

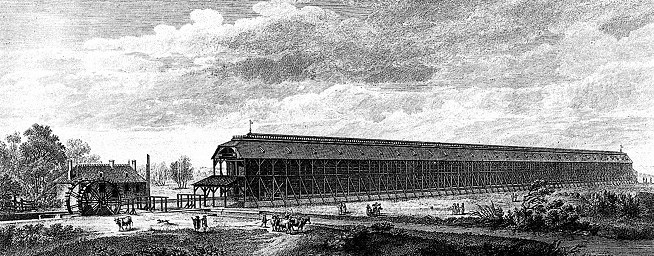
The Graduation Building

- The Graduation de la Saline (Graduation of the Saltworks) (1775)
- The Royal Saltworks (1775)
- The Chateau de Roche (18th century). Originally it was a castle guarding a road and a ford on the Loue. In 1756 it was completely rebuilt by the Marquis de Grammont who intended to make it a home. It is this work that can be seen today. The body of the building is flanked by two square towers with Imperial roofs. In 1864, Amédée Caron transformed it again and implemented industrial activity around the chateau. The castle is now privately owned and can not be visited. It has been an historical monument since 1974.

Gallery of Pictures of the Royal Saltworks

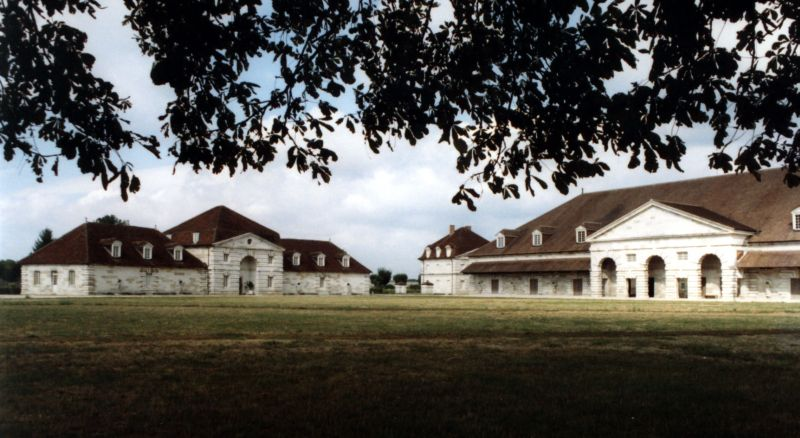

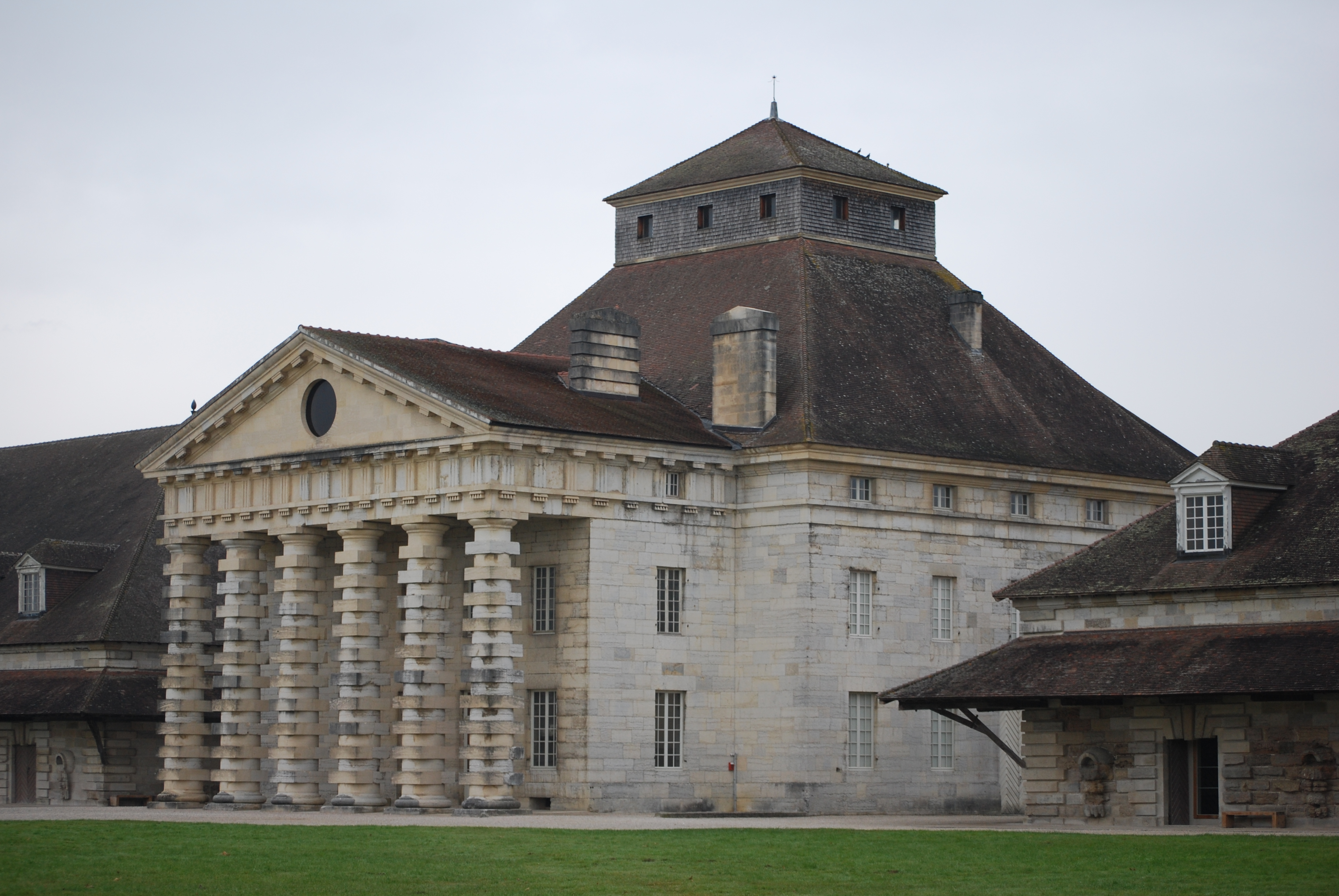

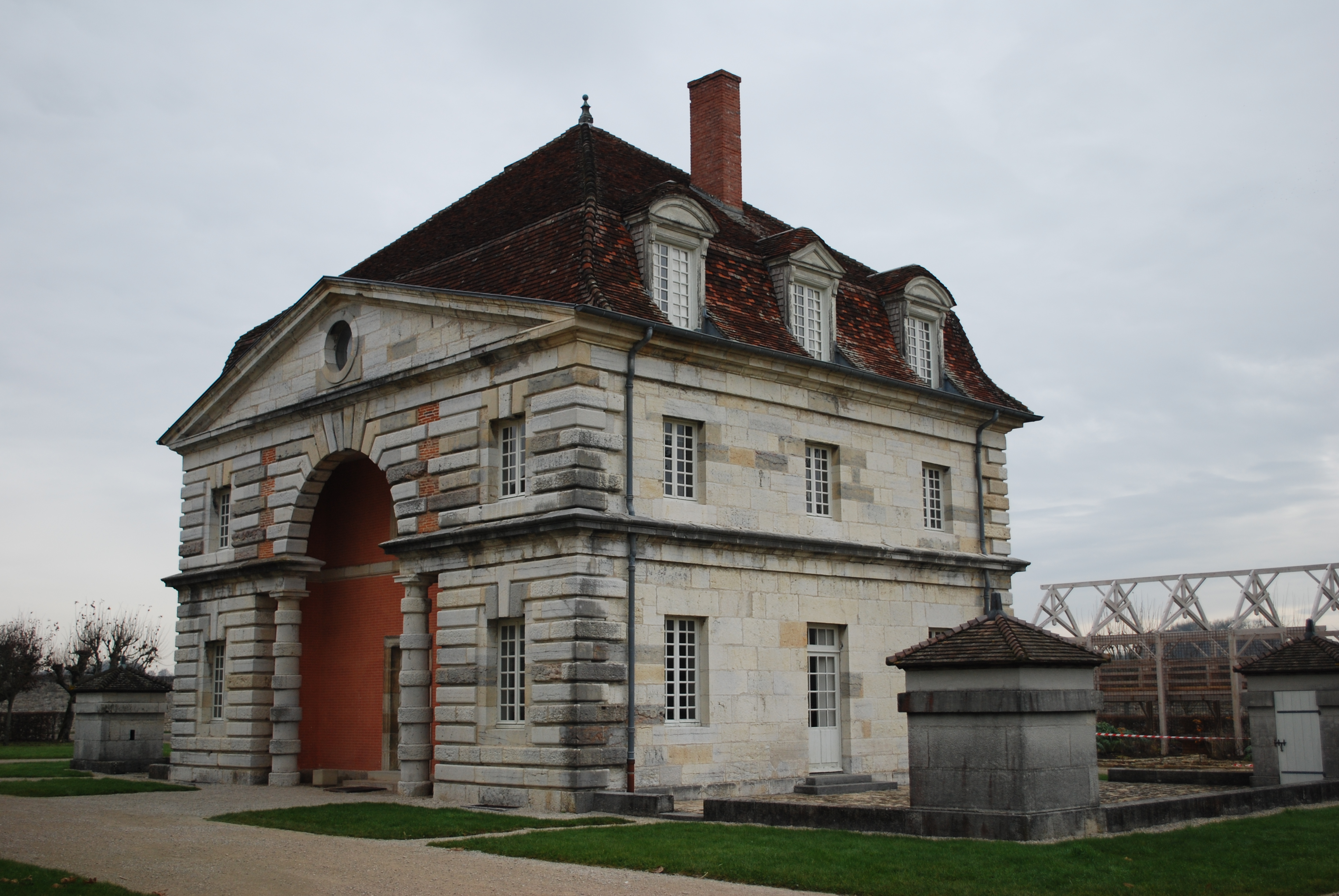

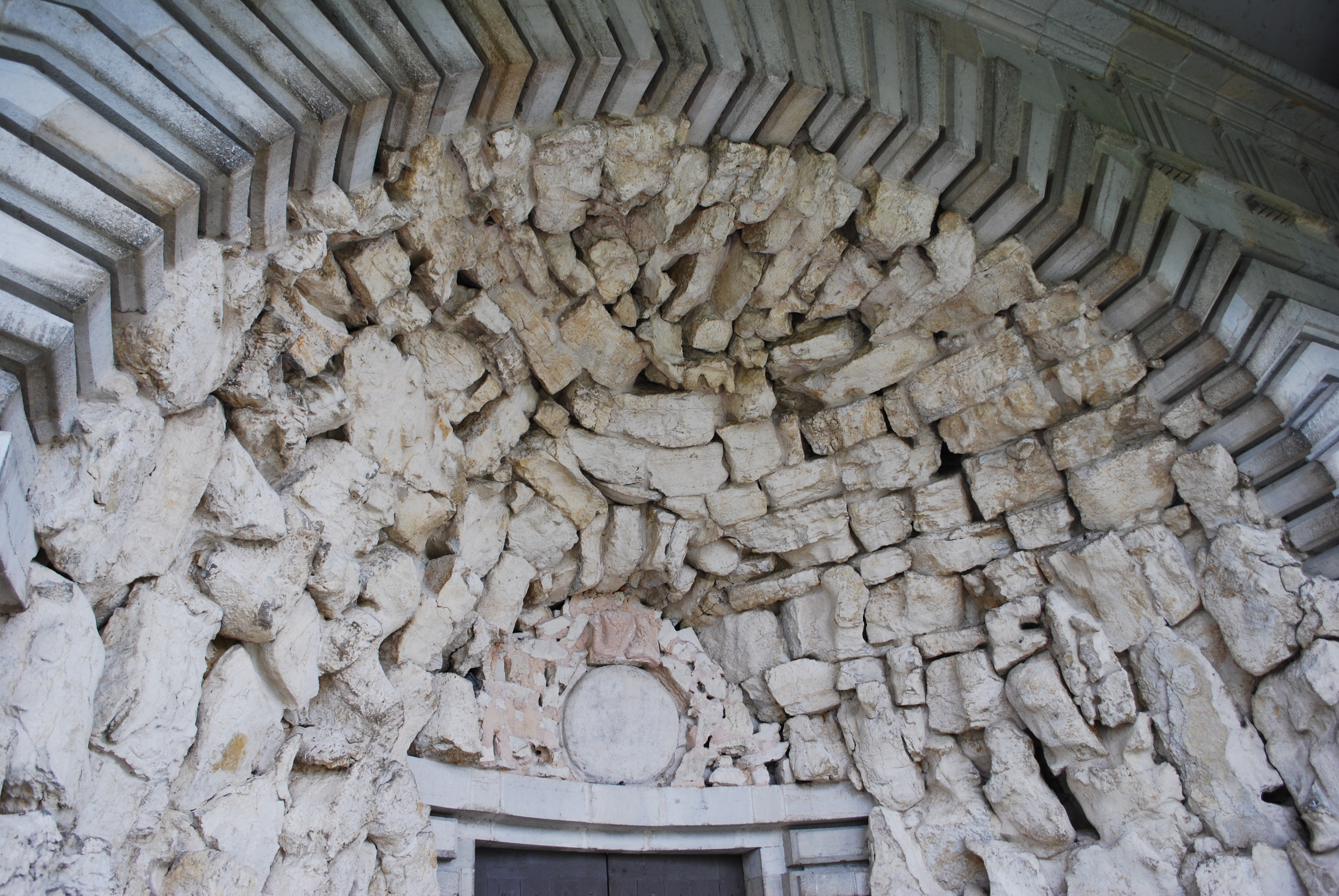
Entrance

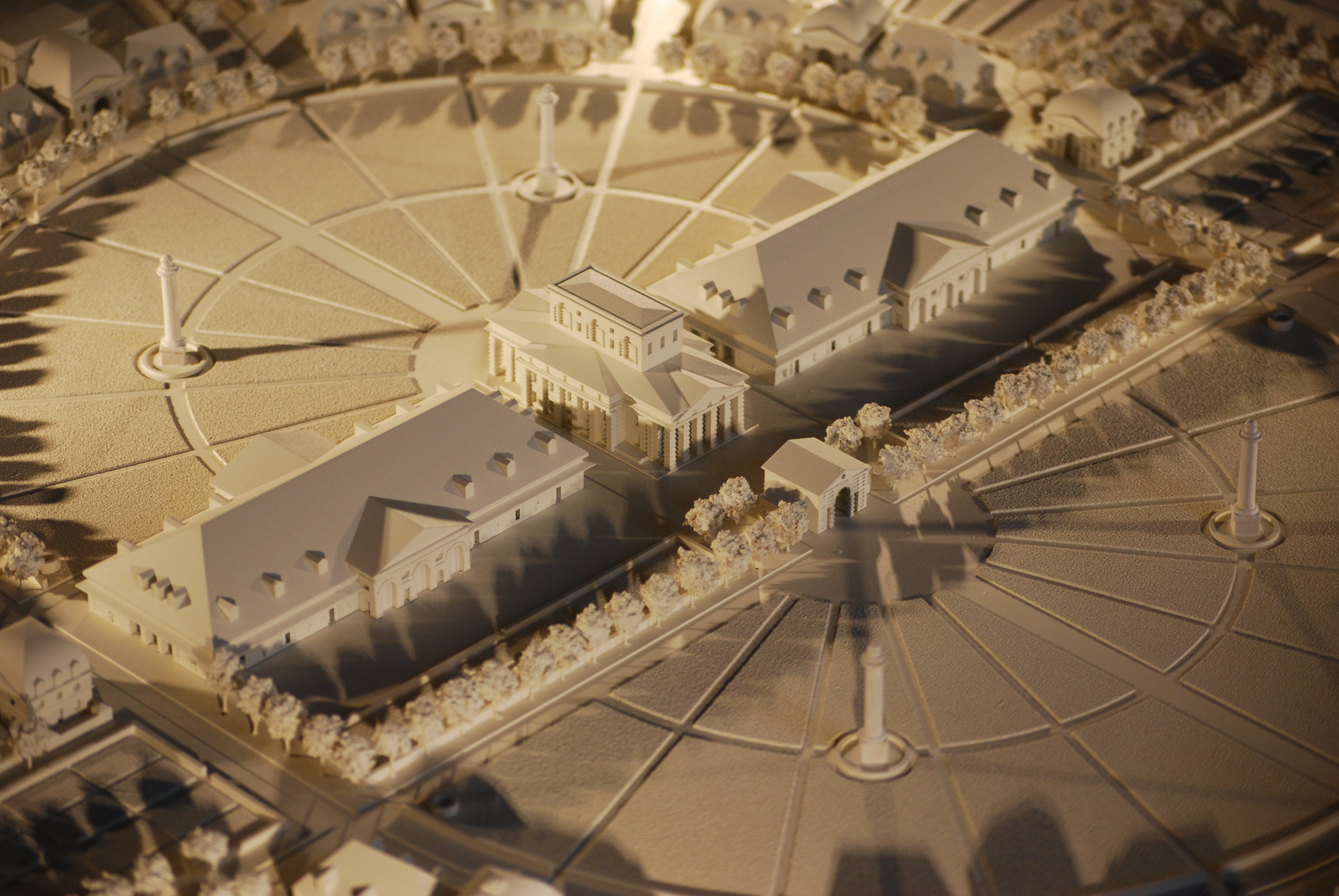

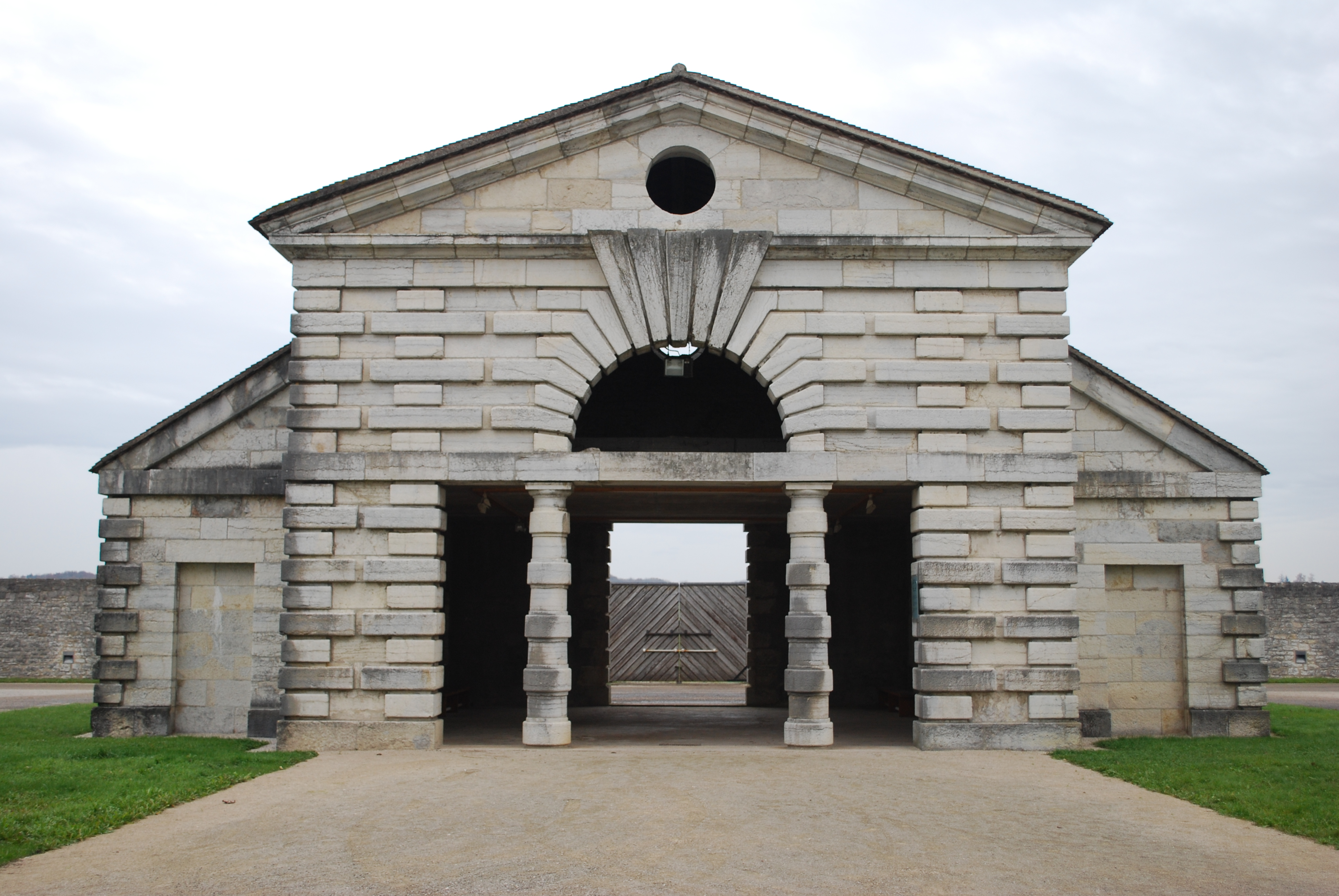

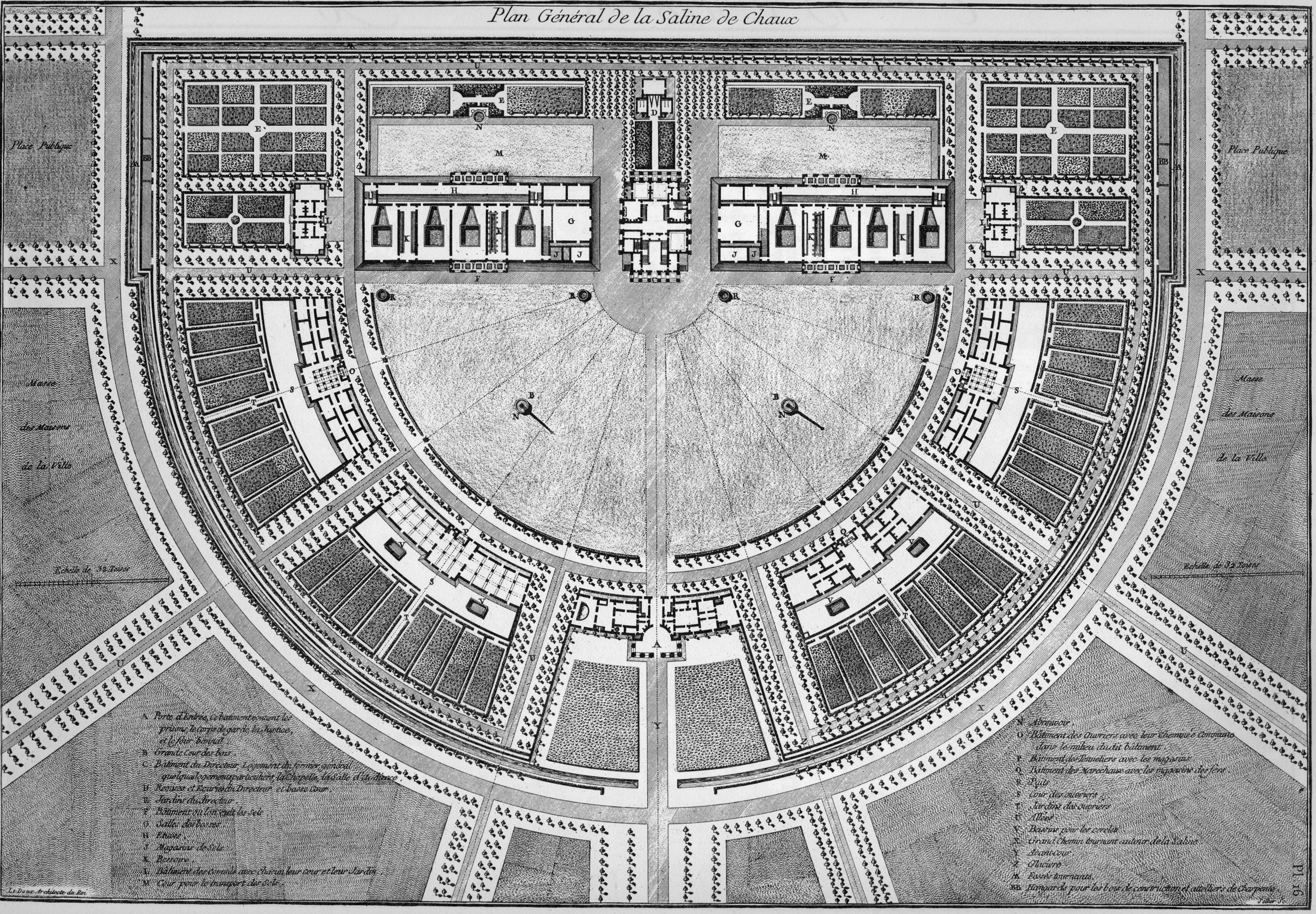
Plan of the Royal Saltworks

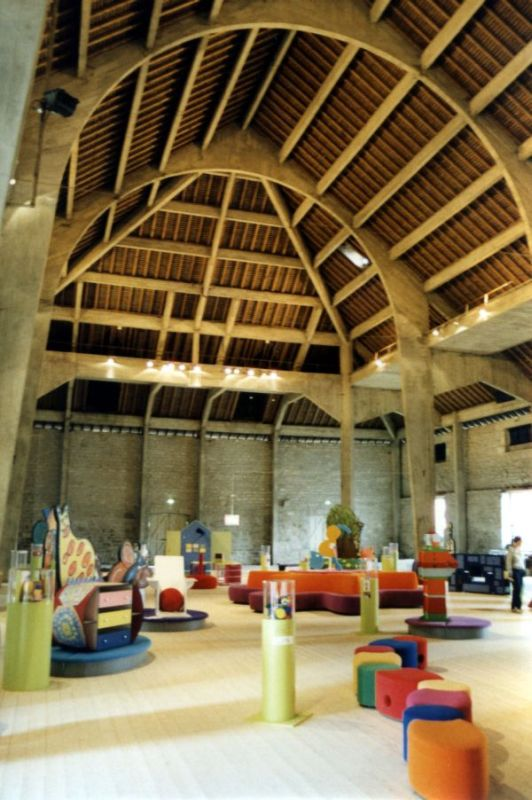
Interior of the Royal Saltworks

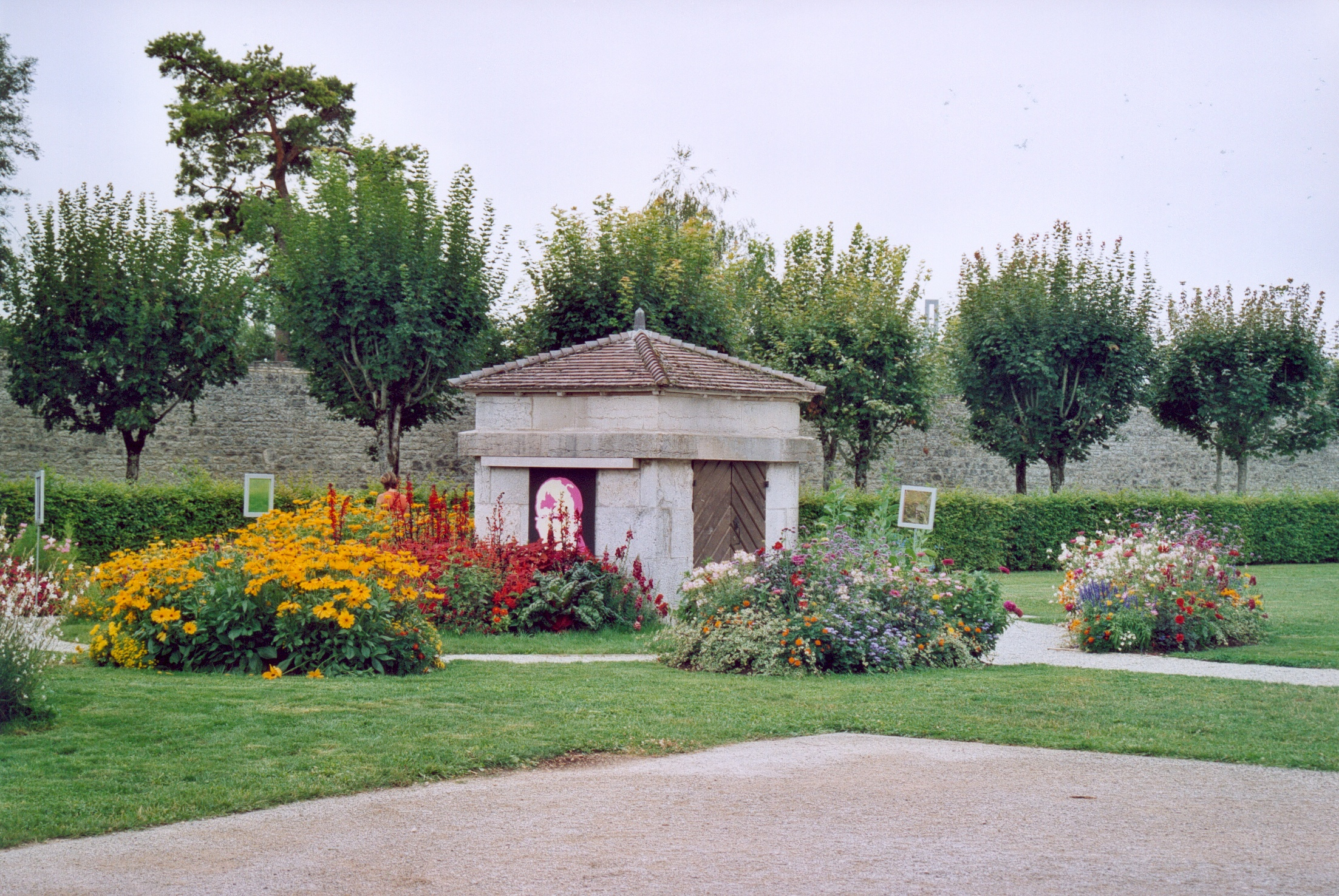
The Garden at the Royal Saltworks

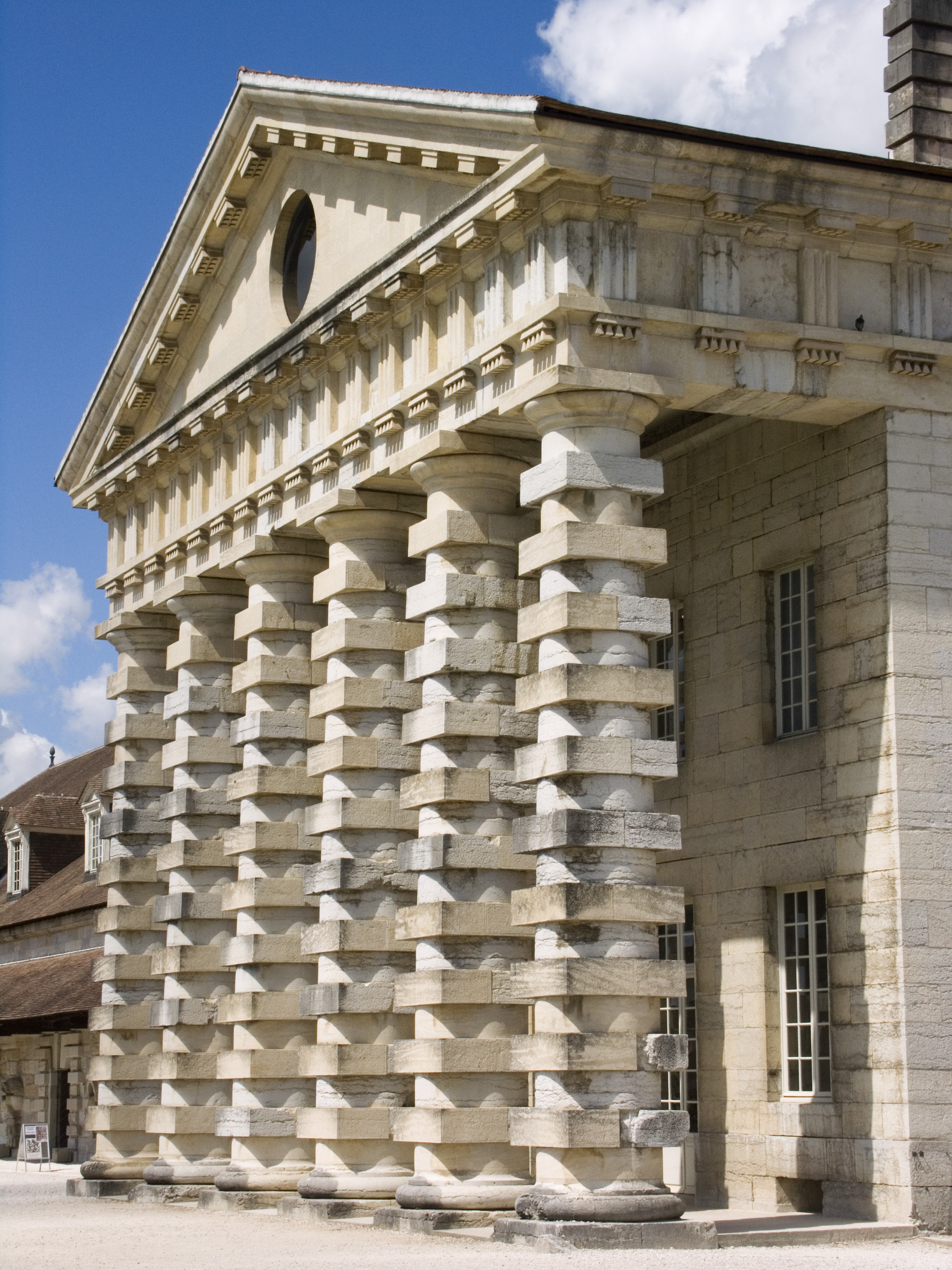
The Directors house entrance

=== Religious heritage ===
The religious heritage of the town is complemented by several wayside crosses erected in the village and by the presence of two chapels.

The Chapel of Arc was built with donations from parishioners and consecrated in 1913. It is dedicated to the Sacred Heart. The bell tower has been rebuilt over nearly 25 years: farmers funded the work by donating the proceeds of the sale of the dairy factory. A complete renovation of the building was completed in 1997 by a team of volunteers.

The Chapel de la Grotte des Essarts (Chapel of the Essarts Cave) was built after the cholera epidemic of 1854. Father Coutteret vowed to build this monument if the Virgin Mary protected the parish. It is a stone building located on a natural promontory overlooking the village and the Royal Saltworks. A procession is held every 15 August. In 2006 the procession was carried out at night with torches and the chapel was illuminated for the occasion with a generator. The commune has renovated the chapel through a subscription.

The Church of Saint-Bénigne was built in the 19th century in the classical style. The bell tower was rebuilt exactly in 1921 following a fire caused by a storm. The church has two organs. It also has many items that are registered as historical objects:

- A Painting: Christ and the chananéenne
- A Painting: Virgin and Child with donors (17th century)
- A Painting: The Saintly Family (17th century)
- A Painting: Placing in the Tomb (17th century)
- A Painting: Saint Joseph and the infant Jesus (17th century)
- A Painting: The Redemption (17th century)
- 4 Paintings: Scenes of the life of the Virgin (17th century)
- A Wayside Cross (19th century)
- A Pulpit (19th century)
- A Painting: Placing in the Tomb (16th century)
- A Painting: Virgin and child (17th century)

== Transportation ==
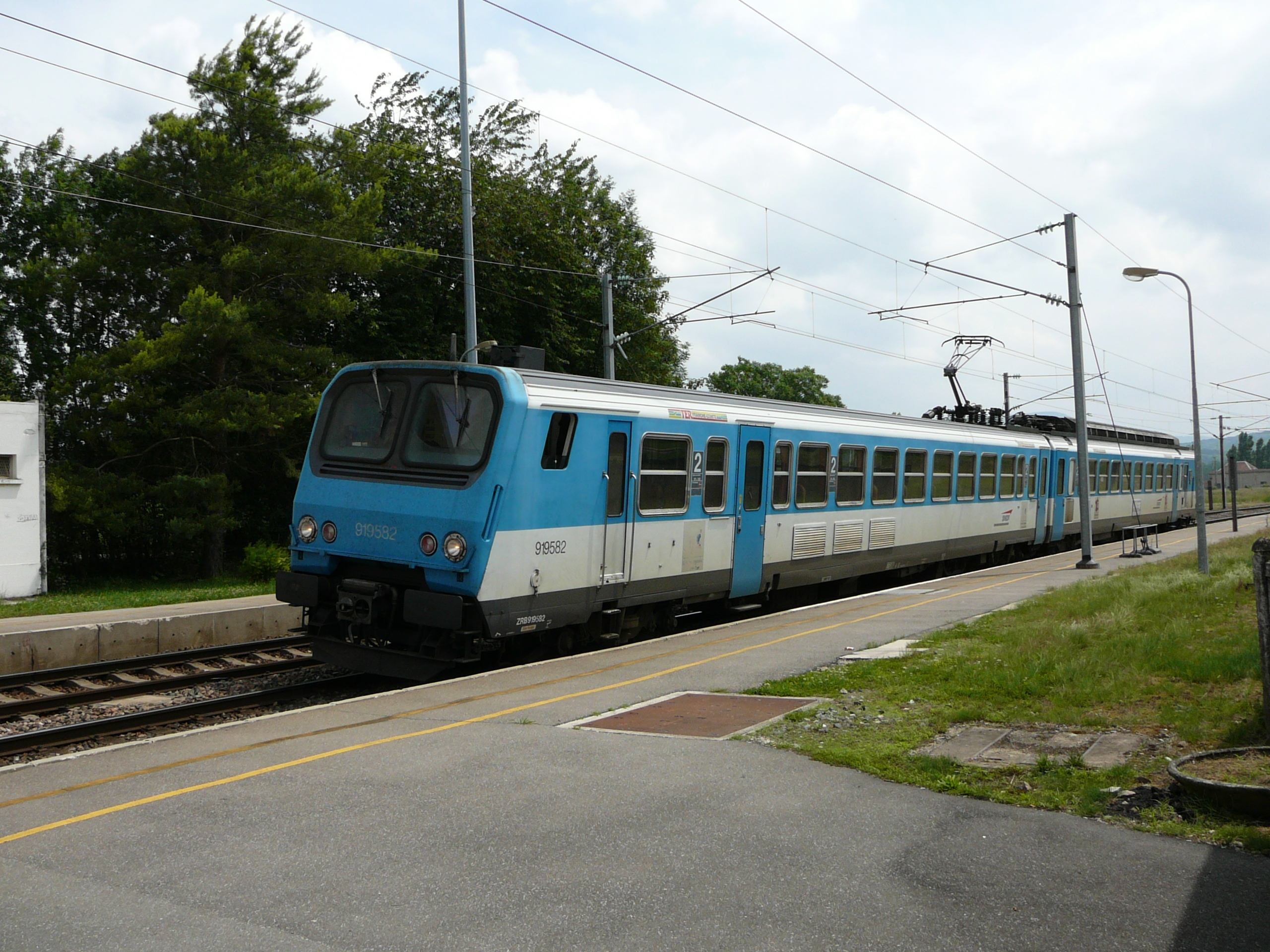
Arc-et-Senans railway station

The commune has a railway station, Arc-et-Senans, on the Franois–Arc-et-Senans and Dijon–Vallorbe lines.

== Notable people linked to the commune ==
- Claude-Nicolas Ledoux, 1736–1806, architect of the Royal Saltworks
- René Caron, 1861–1930, administrator of the Banque de France, MP for Doubs from 1919 to 1924, member of the commission of agriculture as well as those of the economy and finance, president of the administrative council of Eclair Comtois, president of the Union of Catholics of Besançon, president of the Union of Agricultural associations of Doubs, president of the Union Rural workers Credit Unions of France, vice-president of the regional credit union of Burgundy and Franche-Comté, vice-president of the Agricultural Union of Centre-East, vice-president of the Forestry Society of the East, administrator of the branch for the Caisse épargne de Besançon at Arc-et-Senans, member of the Central Trade Union Chamber of the agricultural associations of France, member of the Chamber of agriculture of Besançon, member of the Academy of Sciences, Arts and Letters of Besançon, knight of the pontifical Order of Saint Gregory the great. He married Anne Marie Jacquard and was the son of Amédée Caron, engineer of Art and Manufactured products, sub-director of the Central Industrial and property finance School and of the Anne Alexandrine Nicolas de Meissas.
- Father Jean-François Rigaud, born in 1834 to a farming family in the village. He joined the Paris Foreign Missions Society and became a priest in 1861. He took part in a mission to eastern Sichuan in China. He was killed on 2 January 1869.
- Monseigneur Joseph-Auguste Chevalier, born on 16 March 1814. He was ordained priest in 1837 and joined the Paris Foreign Missions Society. He made his mission in India. On 11 November 1873 he was named Bishop of Hierapolis and apostolic vicar of Mysore. He died on 25 March 1880 of pleurisy and was buried in the Choir of the Cathedral of Bangalore in India.
- Father Pierre Poncet, born at Arc-et-Senans on 28 April 1932. He did his secondary studies at the Masters School of the Cathedral of Besançon then entered the large seminary in the same city. In 1953 he did his military service then requested admission to the Paris Foreign Missions Society in 1954. In 1956 he was newly summoned by the army to go to Algeria and served as 2nd lieutenant during those months. On returning to the Rue du Bac in Paris (headquarters of the Paris Foreign Missions Society) he was ordained priest on 2 February 1958 and was nominated as apostolic vicar of Huế (Central Vietnam). He died at Huế from a burst of sub-machine gun fire on 13 February 1968, as was another missionary – Father Cressonnier.
- Bernard Jobin, artist.

== See also ==
- Communes of the Doubs department
- Royal Saltworks at Arc-et-Senans

=== External links ===
- Arc-et-Senans official website (in French)
- Arc-et-Senans on the old IGN website (in French)
- Arc-et-Senans on Géoportail, National Geographic Institute (IGN) website (in French)
- Arc and Senans on the 1750 Cassini Map
