= Andelot station =

Railway station in Andelot-en-Montagne, France

Andelot
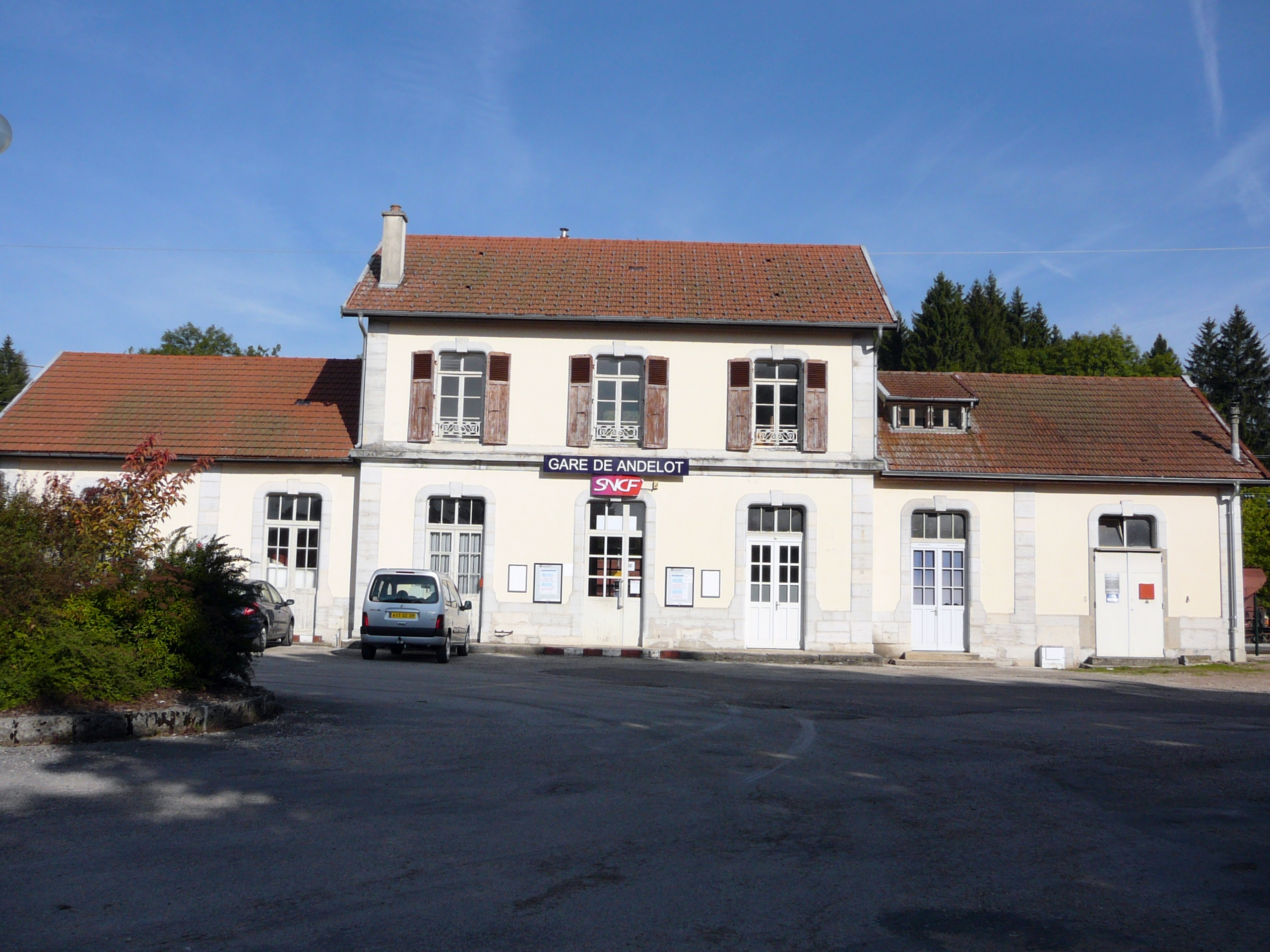
- The station building in 2008

General information
- Location: Andelot-en-Montagne; France
- Coordinates: 46°51′34″N 5°55′25″E
- Owner: SNCF
- Lines: Andelot-en-Montagne–La Cluse line; Dijon–Vallorbe line
- Distance: 416.5 km (258.8 mi) from Paris-Lyon
- Train operators: SNCF

Other information
- Station code: 87715102

Passengers
- 2018: 4,050

Services
Preceding station	TER Bourgogne-Franche-Comté	Following station
Mouchard towards Dole	TER	Frasne towards Pontarlier
Mouchard Terminus	TER	Champagnole towards Saint-Claude
Location

Andelot station (French: Gare d'Andelot) is a railway station in the commune of Andelot-en-Montagne, in the French department of Jura, in the Bourgogne-Franche-Comté region. It is located at the junction of the Andelot-en-Montagne–La Cluse and Dijon–Vallorbe lines of SNCF.

== Services ==
The following services stop at Andelot:

- TER Bourgogne-Franche-Comté:
  - regional service between Dole-Ville and Pontarlier.
  - regional service between Mouchard and Saint-Claude.
