= Arc-et-Senans station =

Railway station in Arc-et-Senans, France

Arc-et-Senans
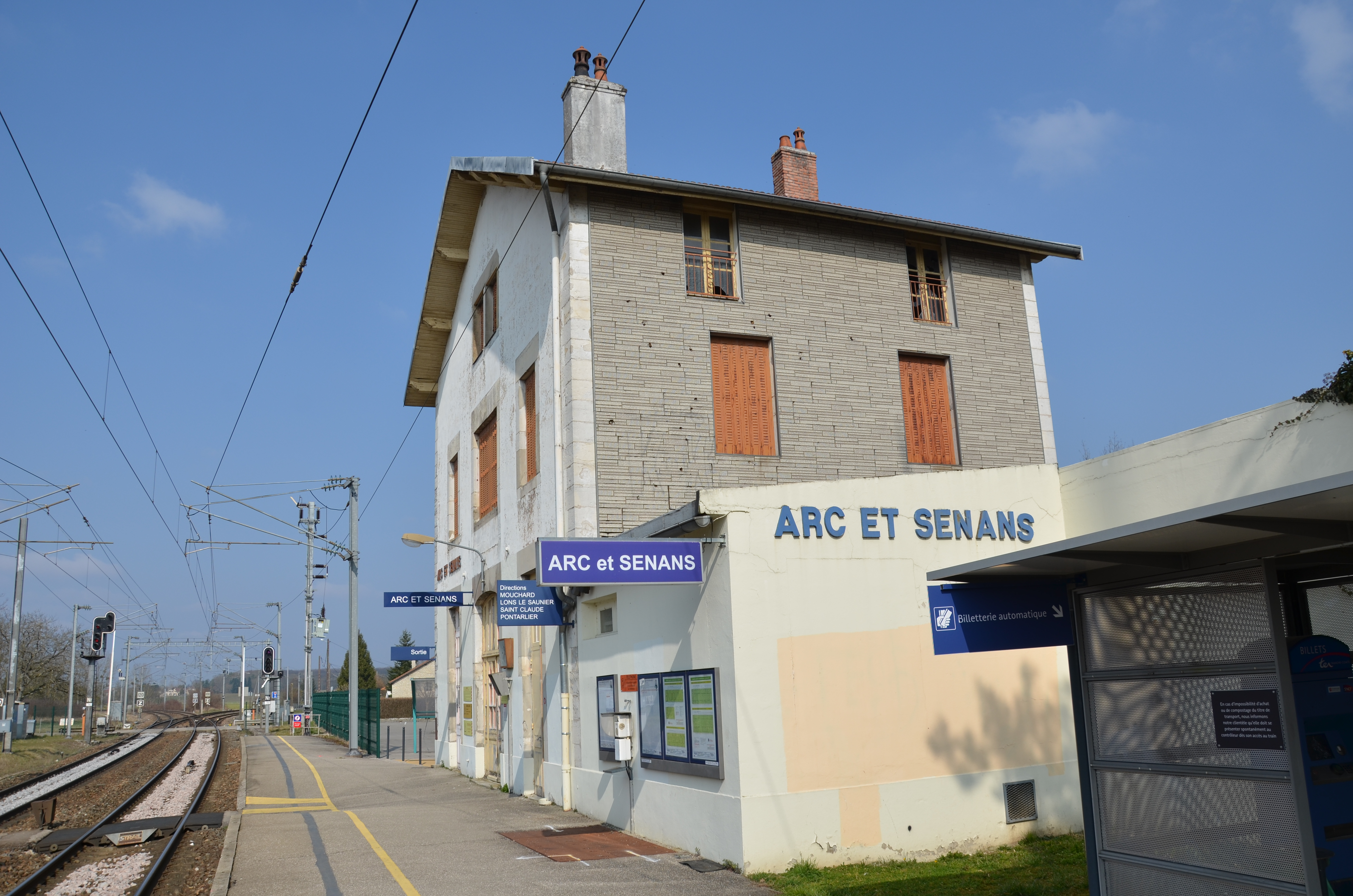
- The station building in 2015

General information
- Location: Arc-et-Senans; France
- Coordinates: 47°01′49″N 5°46′36″E
- Owner: SNCF
- Lines: Dijon–Vallorbe line; Franois–Arc-et-Senans line
- Distance: 385.9 km (239.8 mi) from Paris-Lyon
- Train operators: SNCF

Other information
- Station code: 87718841

Passengers
- 2018: 43,376

Services
Preceding station	TER Bourgogne-Franche-Comté	Following station
Montbarrey towards Dole	TER	Mouchard towards Pontarlier
Liesle towards Besançon	TER	Mouchard towards Bourg-en-Bresse
Location

Arc-et-Senans station (French: Gare d'Arc-et-Senans) is a railway station in the commune of Arc-et-Senans, in the French department of Doubs, in the Bourgogne-Franche-Comté region. It is located at the junction of the Franois–Arc-et-Senans and Dijon–Vallorbe lines of SNCF.

== Services ==
The following services stop at Arc-et-Senans:

- TER Bourgogne-Franche-Comté:
  - regional service between Dole-Ville and Pontarlier.
  - regional service between Bourg-en-Bresse and Besançon-Viotte.
