= Mouchard =

Commune in Bourgogne-Franche-Comté, France

- Commune
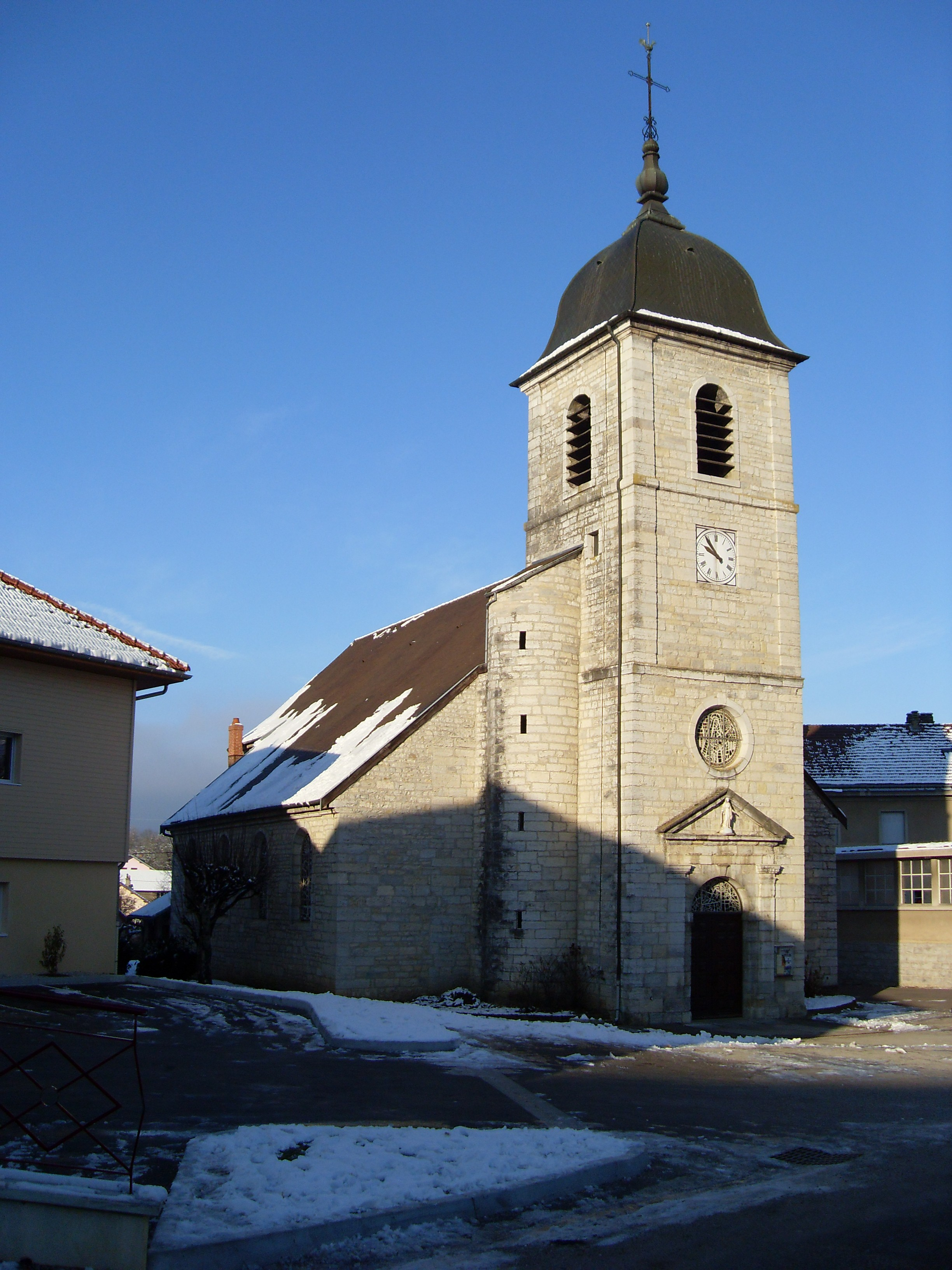
- The church in Mouchard

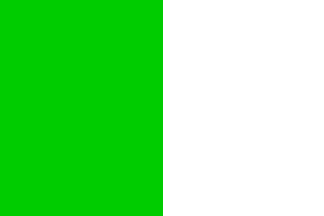
- Flag Coat of arms
- Location of Mouchard
- Location within France Location within Bourgogne-Franche-Comté
- Coordinates: 46°58′28″N 5°47′52″E
- Country: France
- Region: Bourgogne-Franche-Comté
- Department: Jura
- Arrondissement: Dole
- Canton: Mont-sous-Vaudrey

Government
  - Mayor (2020–2026): Sandra Hählen
- Area^{1}: 6.18 km^{2} (2.39 sq mi)
- Highest elevation: 382 m (1,253 ft)
- Lowest elevation: 244 m (801 ft)
- Population (2023): 1,095
  - Density: 177/km^{2} (459/sq mi)
- Time zone: UTC+01:00 (CET)
  - Summer (DST): UTC+02:00 (CEST)
- INSEE/Postal code: 39370 /39330
- ^{1} French Land Register data, which excludes lakes, ponds, glaciers > 1 km^{2} (0.386 sq mi or 247 acres) and river estuaries.

Mouchard (French pronunciation: [muʃaʁ]) is a commune in the Jura department in Bourgogne-Franche-Comté in eastern France.

== Population ==
Historical population
Year	Pop.	±% p.a.
1968	1,171	—
1975	1,053	−1.51%
1982	1,052	−0.01%
1990	997	−0.67%
1999	1,018	+0.23%
2007	1,188	+1.95%
2012	1,169	−0.32%
2017	1,101	−1.19%
2023	1,095	−0.09%
Source: INSEE

== Transportation ==
The commune has a railway station, Mouchard, on the Mouchard–Bourg-en-Bresse and Dijon–Vallorbe lines.

== See also ==
- Communes of the Jura department
