= Forest of Chaux =

Forest in France

Forest of Chaux French: Forêt de Chaux
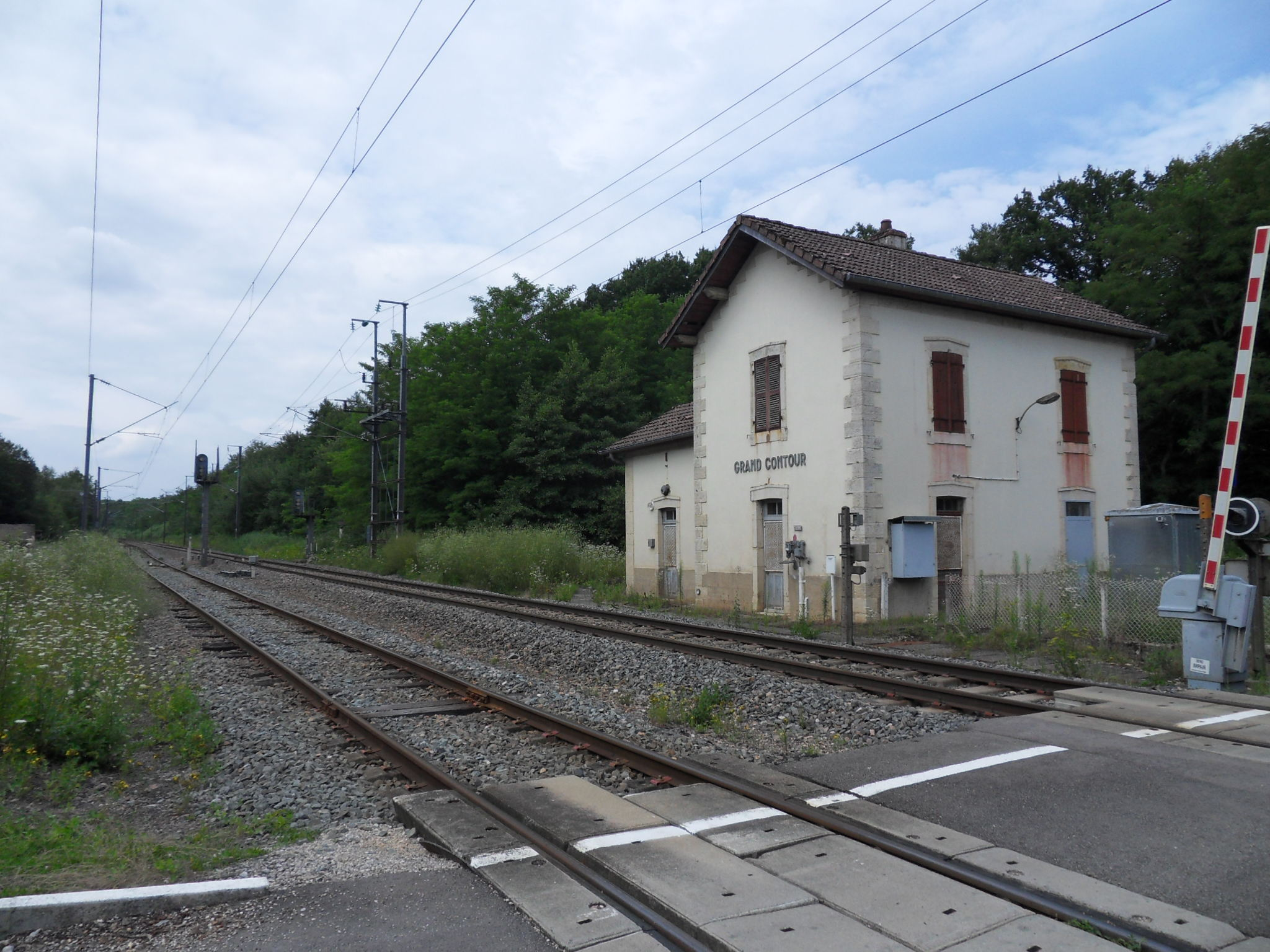
- The defunct railroad station of Grand-Contour, situated within the forest

- Location within France

Geography
- Location: Jura, Bourgogne-Franche-Comté, France
- Coordinates: 47°04′03″N 5°34′50″E
- Area: 204 square kilometres (79 sq mi)

Administration
- Status: National Forest
- Authority: National Forests Office

Ecology
- Dominant tree species: Sessile oak

The Forest of Chaux is the fifth largest forest in France. Its 20,493 hectares are located in the region of Franche-Comté on the plains west of the Jura Mountains.

Exploitation of the forest dates back to the thirteenth century, and there is an ancient tradition of raftsmen floating timber down the Loue to the Saône and the Rhone, and thence to the Mediterranean. Today, the "Confrérie Saint Nicolas" maintains the raftsman tradition on the Loue.

When Franche-Comté became part of France in 1678, the Crown took possession of the Forest because of its potential for supplying timber for the Royal navy. In 1779, Louis XIV ordered the construction of the Royal Saltworks at Arc-et-Senans near the forest so that the works could use its wood to produce salt by boiling brine.
