= Mouchard station =

Railway station in Mouchard, France

Mouchard
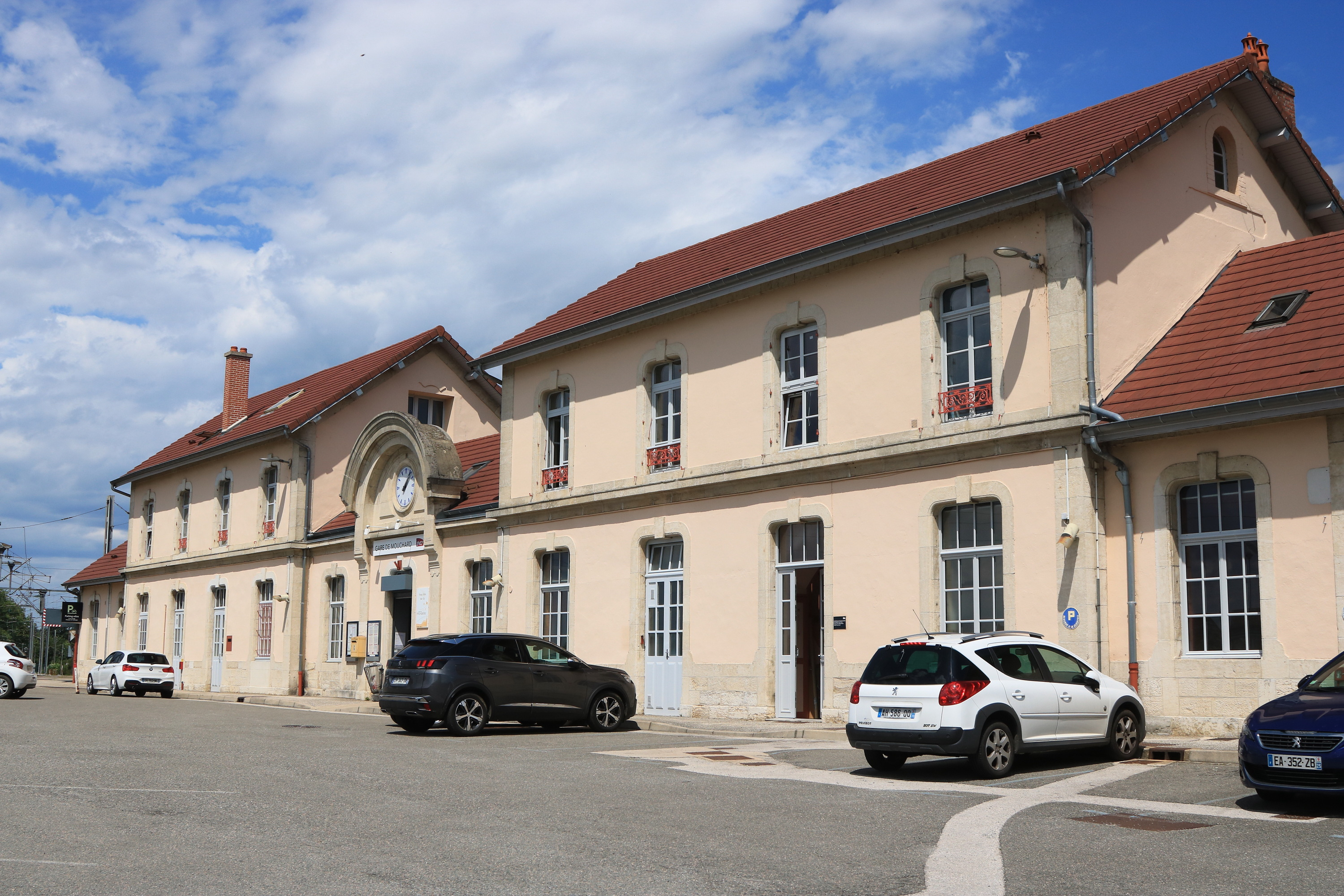
- Mouchard station passenger building in 2019.

General information
- Location: Place de la gare 39330 Mouchard; Jura; France
- Coordinates: 46°58′37″N 5°47′59″E
- Owner: SNCF
- Lines: Dijon–Vallorbe line; Mouchard–Bourg-en-Bresse line
- Distance: 392.3 km (243.8 mi) from Paris-Lyon
- Train operators: SNCF; TGV Lyria

Other information
- Station code: 87718833

History
- Opened: 16 June 1857; 169 years ago

Passengers
- 2018: 97,303

Services
Preceding station	TGV Lyria	Following station
Dole-Ville towards Paris-Lyon	Paris to Lausanne	Frasne towards Lausanne
Preceding station	TER Bourgogne-Franche-Comté	Following station
Arc-et-Senans towards Dole	TER	Andelot towards Pontarlier
Terminus	TER	Andelot towards Saint-Claude
Arc-et-Senans towards Besançon	TER	Arbois towards Bourg-en-Bresse
Location

Mouchard station (French: Gare de Mouchard) is a railway station in the commune of Mouchard, in the French department of Jura, in the Bourgogne-Franche-Comté region. It is located at the junction of the Mouchard—Bourg-en-Bresse and Dijon–Vallorbe lines of SNCF.

== Services ==
The following services stop at Mouchard:

- TGV Lyria: high-speed service between Paris-Lyon and Lausanne.
- TER Bourgogne-Franche-Comté:
  - regional service between Dole-Ville and Pontarlier.
  - regional service between Bourg-en-Bresse and Besançon-Viotte.
  - regional service to Saint-Claude.
