= Montbarrey station =

Railway station in Montbarrey, France

Montbarrey
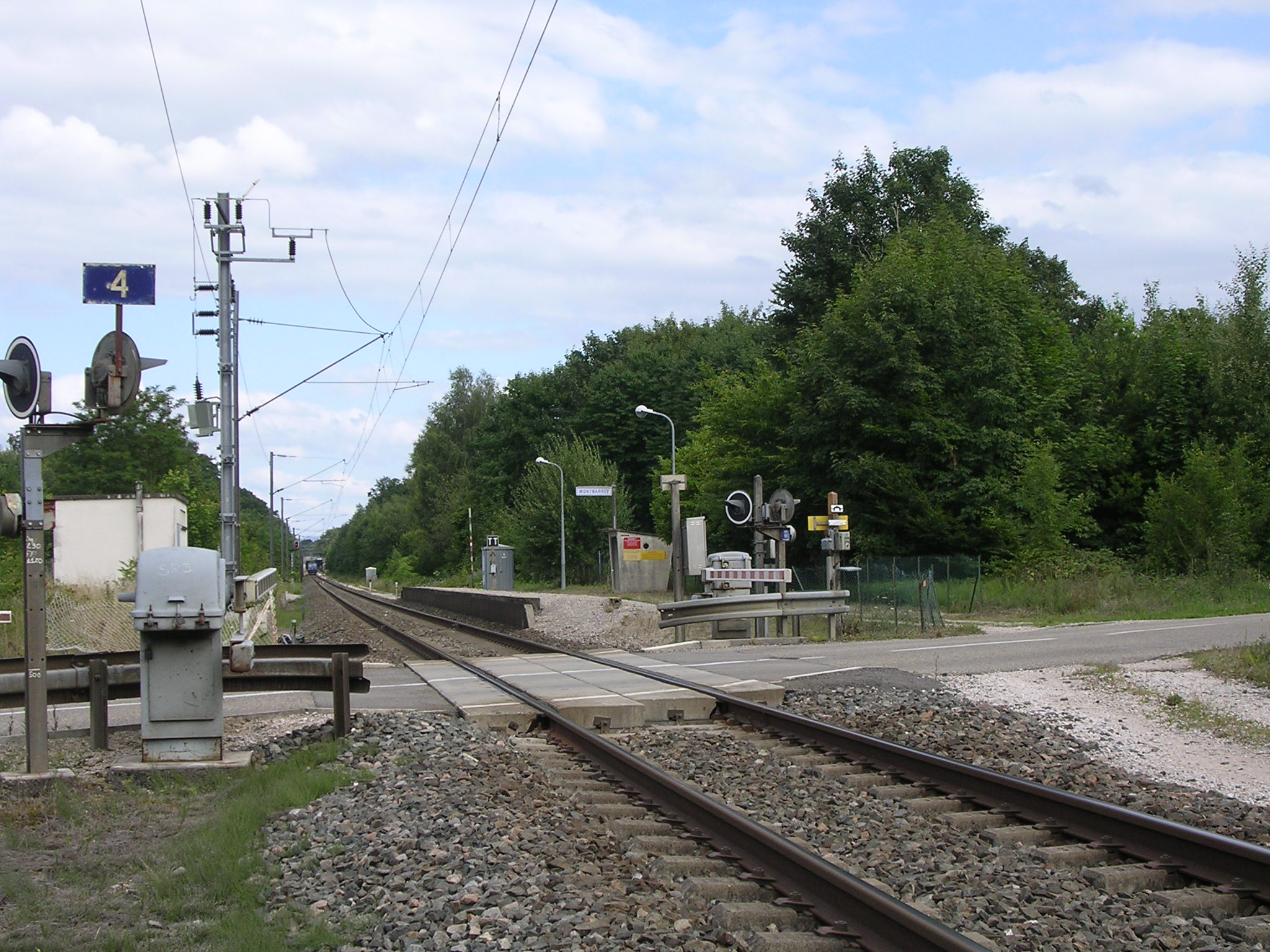
- The station platform in 2009

General information
- Location: Montbarrey; France
- Coordinates: 47°02′10″N 5°38′12″E
- Owner: SNCF
- Line: Dijon–Vallorbe line
- Distance: 374.9 km (233.0 mi) from Paris-Lyon
- Train operators: SNCF

Other information
- Station code: 87718866

Passengers
- 2018: 284

Services
Preceding station	TER Bourgogne-Franche-Comté	Following station
Dole-Ville towards Dole	TER	Arc-et-Senans towards Pontarlier
Location

Montbarrey station (French: Gare de Montbarrey) is a railway station in the commune of Montbarrey, in the French department of Jura, in the Bourgogne-Franche-Comté region. It is an intermediate stop on the Dijon–Vallorbe line of SNCF.

== Services ==
The following services stop at Montbarrey:

- TER Bourgogne-Franche-Comté: regional service between Dole-Ville and Pontarlier.
