= Chissey-sur-Loue =

Commune in Bourgogne-Franche-Comté, France

- Commune
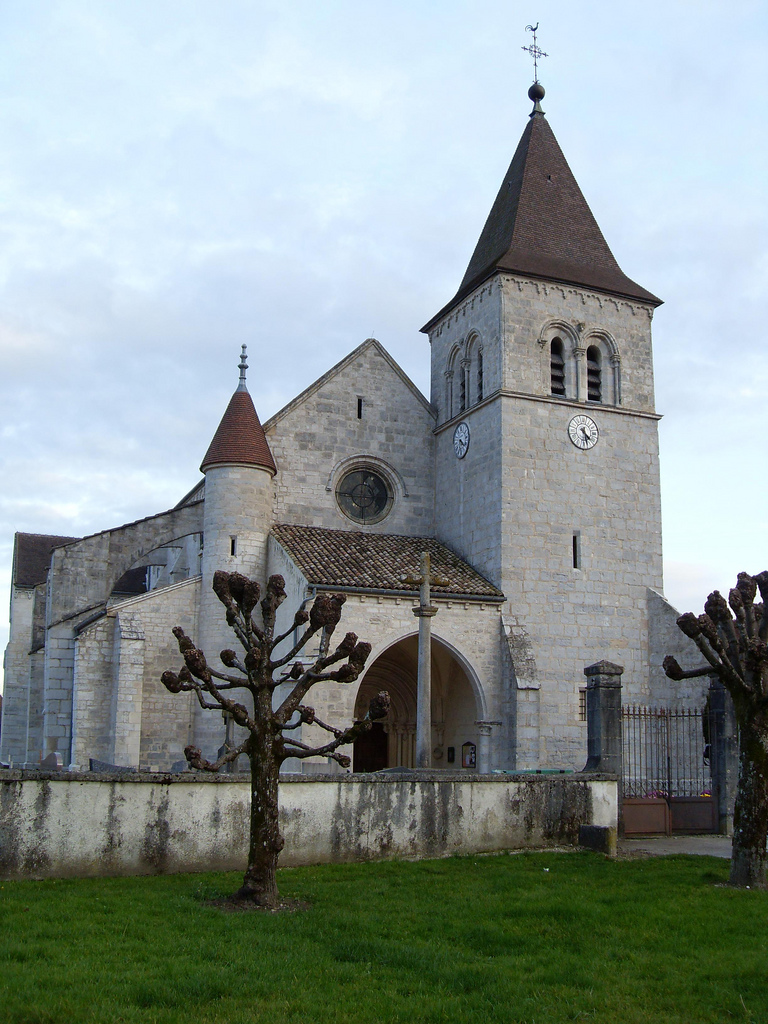
- The church in Chissey-sur-Loue

- Coat of arms
- Location of Chissey-sur-Loue
- Location within France Location within Bourgogne-Franche-Comté
- Coordinates: 47°01′19″N 5°43′18″E
- Country: France
- Region: Bourgogne-Franche-Comté
- Department: Jura
- Arrondissement: Dole
- Canton: Mont-sous-Vaudrey

Government
  - Mayor (2020–2026): Jean-Claude Pichon
- Area^{1}: 38.56 km^{2} (14.89 sq mi)
- Highest elevation: 282 m (925 ft)
- Lowest elevation: 223 m (732 ft)
- Population (2023): 323
  - Density: 8.38/km^{2} (21.7/sq mi)
- Time zone: UTC+01:00 (CET)
  - Summer (DST): UTC+02:00 (CEST)
- INSEE/Postal code: 39149 /39380
- ^{1} French Land Register data, which excludes lakes, ponds, glaciers > 1 km^{2} (0.386 sq mi or 247 acres) and river estuaries.

Chissey-sur-Loue (French pronunciation: [ʃisɛ syʁ lu], literally Chissey on Loue) is a commune in the Jura department in Bourgogne-Franche-Comté in eastern France.

== Population ==
Historical population
Year	Pop.	±% p.a.
1968	369	—
1975	299	−2.96%
1982	335	+1.64%
1990	336	+0.04%
1999	350	+0.45%
2007	355	+0.18%
2012	334	−1.21%
2017	320	−0.85%
2023	323	+0.16%
Source: INSEE

== See also ==
- Communes of the Jura department
