= Ouhans =

- Commune
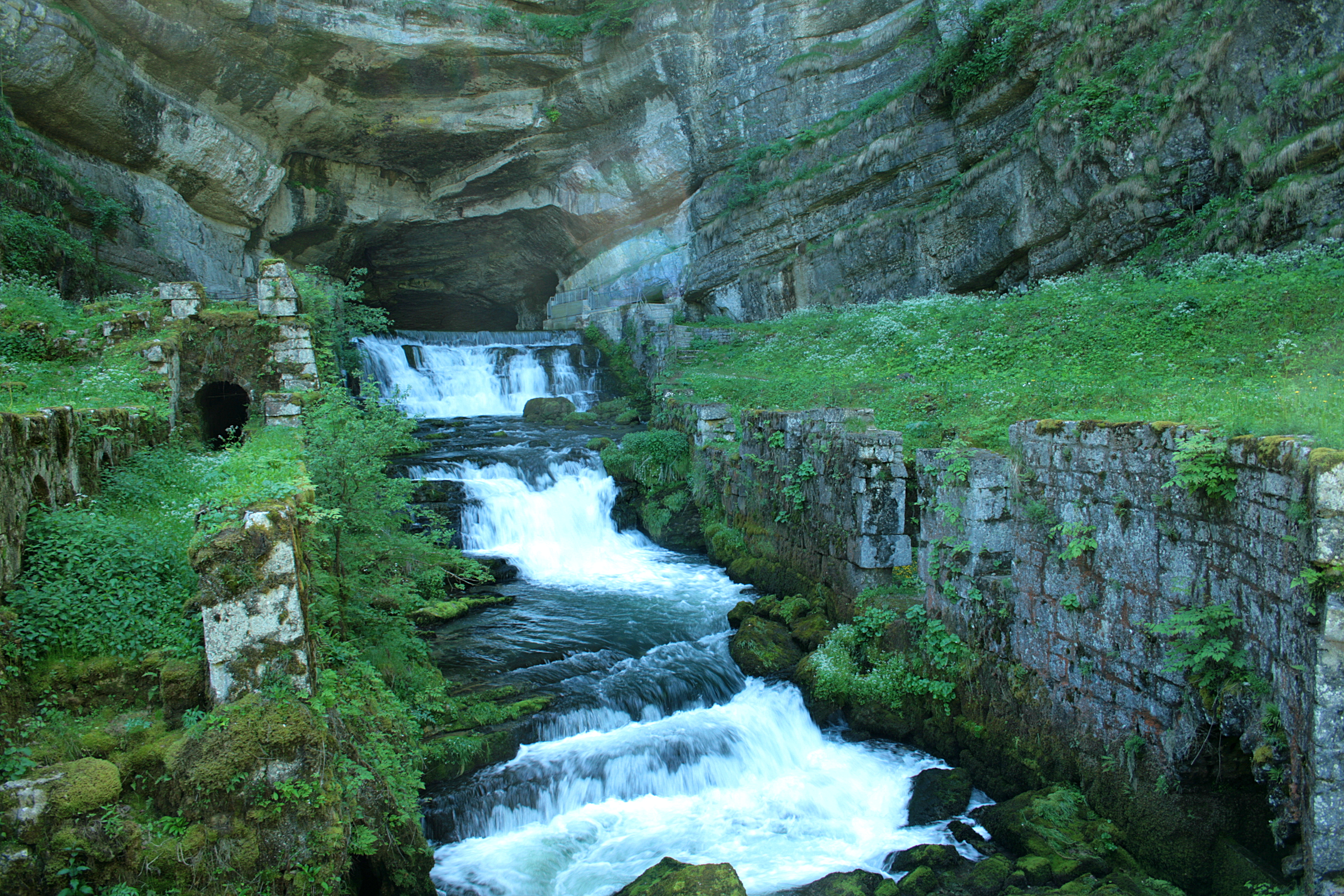
- Source of the Loue

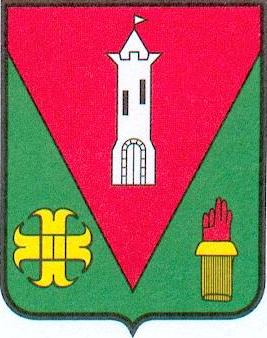
- Coat of arms
- Location of Ouhans
- Location within France Location within Bourgogne-Franche-Comté
- Coordinates: 46°59′57″N 6°17′39″E
- Country: France
- Region: Bourgogne-Franche-Comté
- Department: Doubs
- Arrondissement: Pontarlier
- Canton: Ornans
- Intercommunality: CC entre Doubs et Loue

Government
  - Mayor (2020–2026): Michel Hergott
- Area^{1}: 15.85 km^{2} (6.12 sq mi)
- Highest elevation: 1,040 m (3,410 ft)
- Lowest elevation: 500 m (1,600 ft)
- Population (2023): 398
  - Density: 25.1/km^{2} (65.0/sq mi)
- Time zone: UTC+01:00 (CET)
  - Summer (DST): UTC+02:00 (CEST)
- INSEE/Postal code: 25440 /25520
- ^{1} French Land Register data, which excludes lakes, ponds, glaciers > 1 km^{2} (0.386 sq mi or 247 acres) and river estuaries.

Ouhans (French pronunciation: [u.ɑ̃]) is a commune in the Doubs department in the Bourgogne-Franche-Comté region in eastern France. The source of the river Loue is in the commune.

== Population ==
Historical population
Year	Pop.	±% p.a.
1968	286	—
1975	264	−1.14%
1982	269	+0.27%
1990	287	+0.81%
1999	334	+1.70%
2007	376	+1.49%
2012	373	−0.16%
2017	376	+0.16%
2023	398	+0.95%
Source: INSEE

== See also ==
- Communes of the Doubs department
