= Andelot-en-Montagne =

Commune in Bourgogne-Franche-Comté, France

- Commune
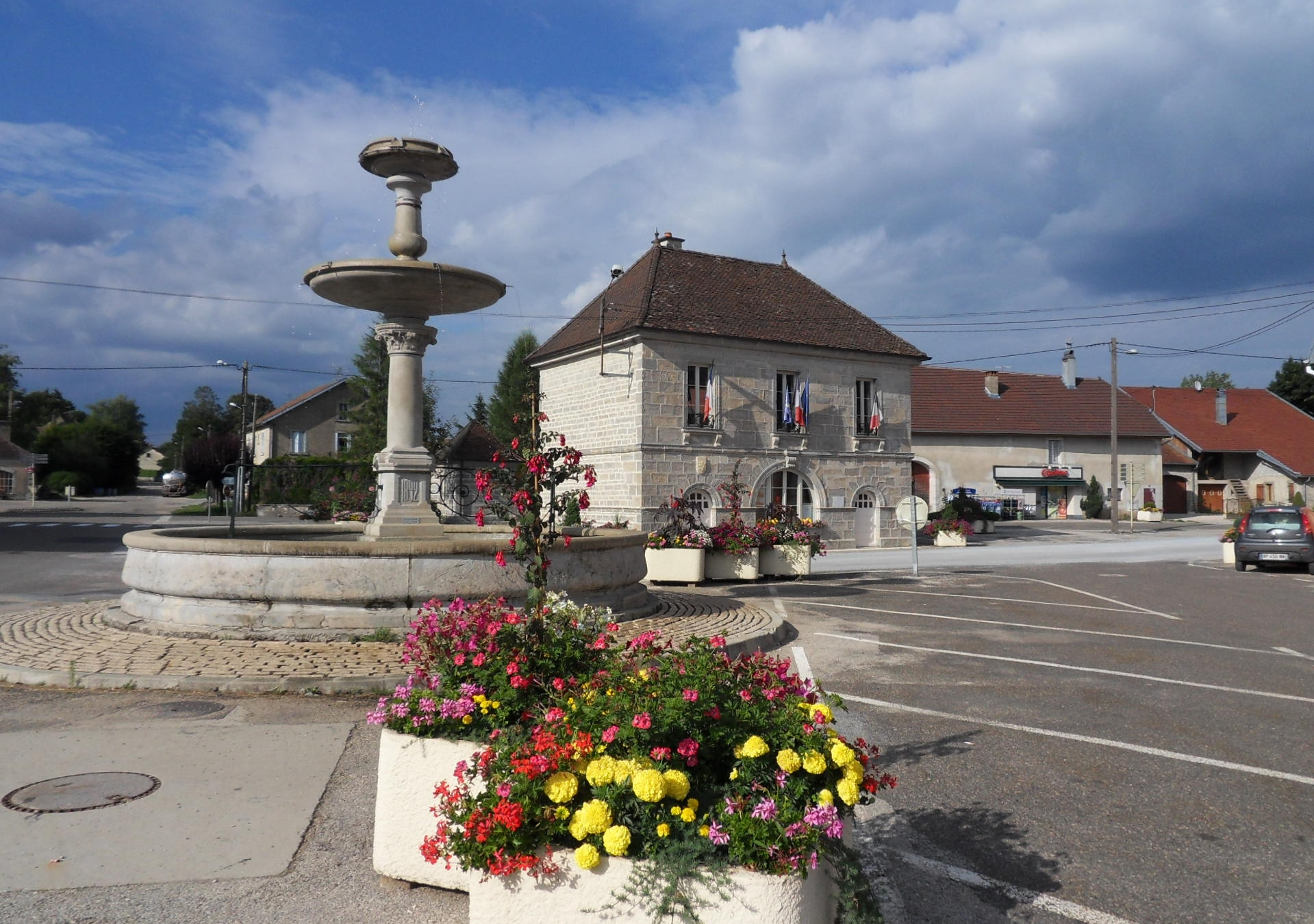
- The town hall and fountain in Andelot-en-Montagne

- Coat of arms
- Location of Andelot-en-Montagne
- Location within France Location within Bourgogne-Franche-Comté
- Coordinates: 46°51′13″N 5°56′03″E
- Country: France
- Region: Bourgogne-Franche-Comté
- Department: Jura
- Arrondissement: Lons-le-Saunier
- Canton: Champagnole
- Intercommunality: Champagnole Nozeroy Jura

Government
  - Mayor (2020–2026): Pascal Volpoet
- Area^{1}: 12.48 km^{2} (4.82 sq mi)
- Highest elevation: 740 m (2,430 ft)
- Lowest elevation: 597 m (1,959 ft)
- Population (2023): 574
  - Density: 46.0/km^{2} (119/sq mi)
- Time zone: UTC+01:00 (CET)
  - Summer (DST): UTC+02:00 (CEST)
- INSEE/Postal code: 39009 /39110
- ^{1} French Land Register data, which excludes lakes, ponds, glaciers > 1 km^{2} (0.386 sq mi or 247 acres) and river estuaries.

Andelot-en-Montagne (French pronunciation: [ɑ̃dlo ɑ̃ mɔ̃taɲ]) is a commune in the Jura department in the region of Bourgogne-Franche-Comté in eastern France. Andelot station has rail connections to Pontarlier, Dole and Saint-Claude.

== Population ==
Historical population
Year	Pop.	±% p.a.
1968	605	—
1975	548	−1.40%
1982	555	+0.18%
1990	561	+0.13%
1999	548	−0.26%
2007	544	−0.09%
2012	539	−0.18%
2017	526	−0.49%
2023	574	+1.47%
Source: INSEE

== See also ==
- Communes of the Jura department
