= Montbarrey =

Commune in Bourgogne-Franche-Comté, France

- Commune
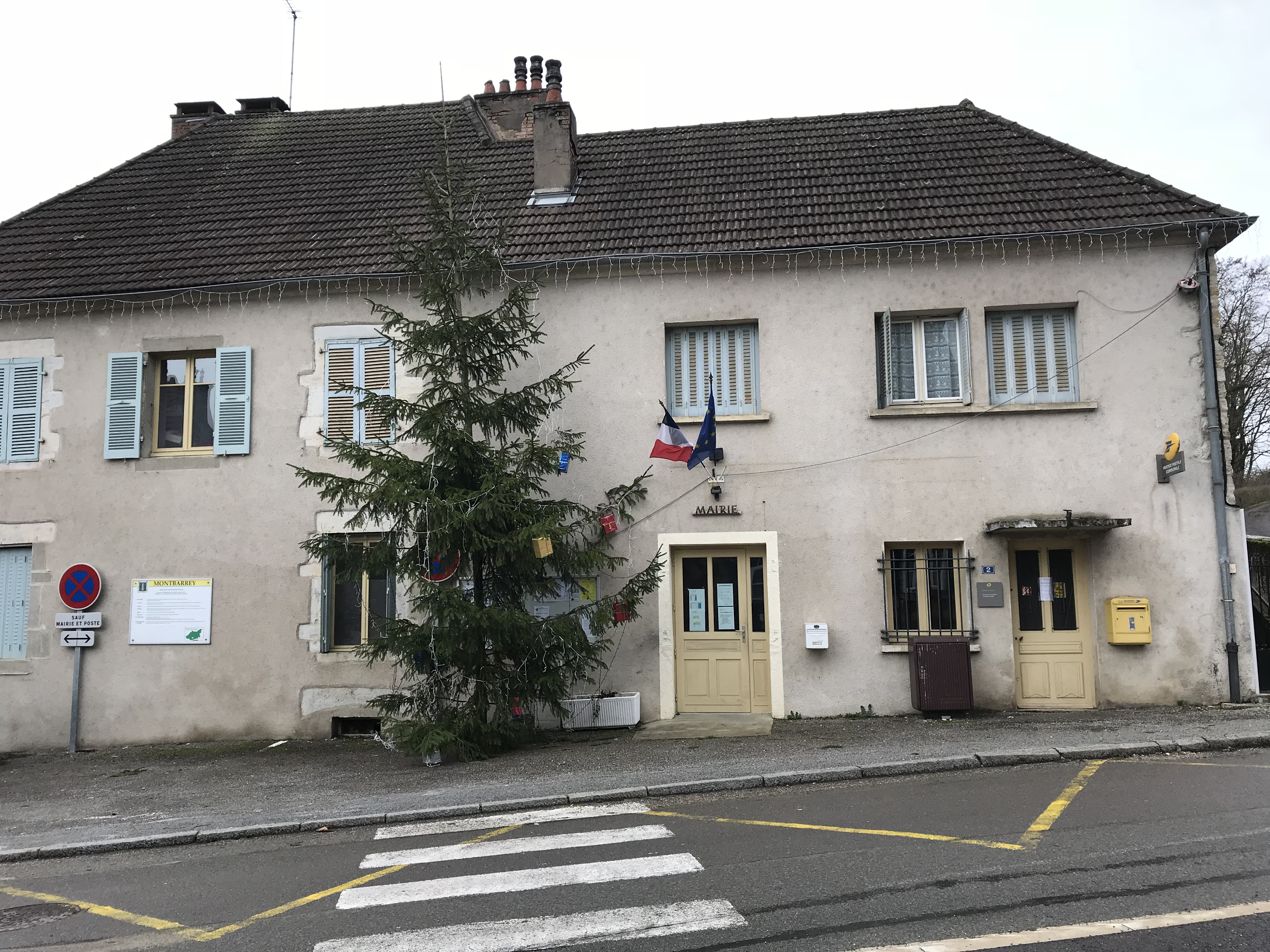
- The town hall in Montbarrey

- Coat of arms
- Location of Montbarrey
- Location within France Location within Bourgogne-Franche-Comté
- Coordinates: 47°01′14″N 5°38′31″E
- Country: France
- Region: Bourgogne-Franche-Comté
- Department: Jura
- Arrondissement: Dole
- Canton: Mont-sous-Vaudrey

Government
  - Mayor (2020–2026): Luc Baton
- Area^{1}: 9.70 km^{2} (3.75 sq mi)
- Highest elevation: 247 m (810 ft)
- Lowest elevation: 212 m (696 ft)
- Population (2023): 304
  - Density: 31.3/km^{2} (81.2/sq mi)
- Time zone: UTC+01:00 (CET)
  - Summer (DST): UTC+02:00 (CEST)
- INSEE/Postal code: 39350 /39380
- ^{1} French Land Register data, which excludes lakes, ponds, glaciers > 1 km^{2} (0.386 sq mi or 247 acres) and river estuaries.

Montbarrey (French pronunciation: [mɔ̃baʁɛ]) is a commune in the Jura department in Bourgogne-Franche-Comté in eastern France.

== Transport ==
The commune has a railway station, Montbarrey, on the Dijon–Vallorbe line.

== See also ==
- Communes of the Jura department
