= Royal Saltworks at Arc-et-Senans =

UNESCO World Heritage Site in France

- Saline royale d'Arc-et-Senans
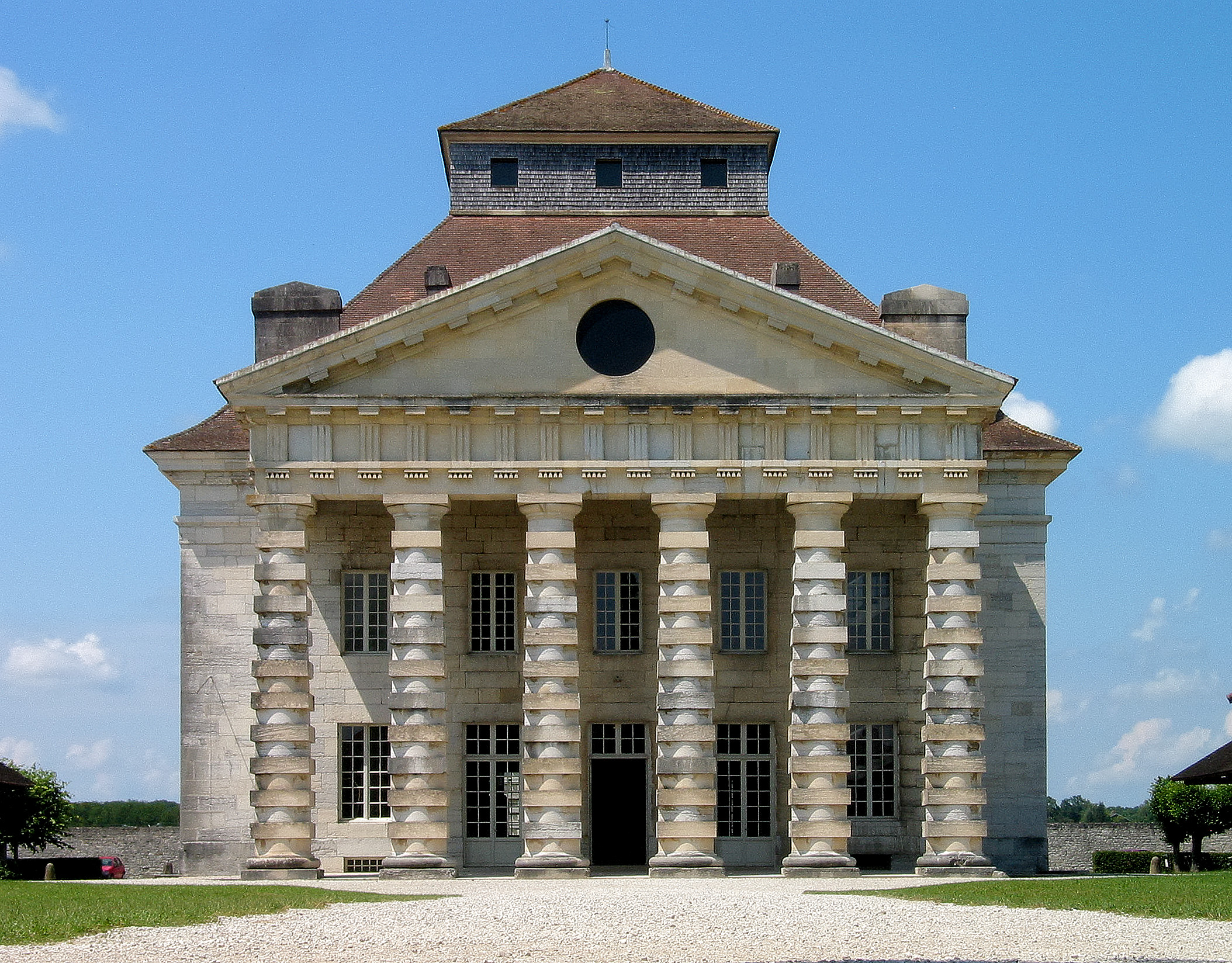
- Main façade of the Royal Saltworks
- Interactive map of the Royal Saltworks at Arc-et-Senans area

General information
- Location: Arc-et-Senans, Doubs, France
- Coordinates: 47.033°N 5.778°E
- Construction started: 1775

Design and construction
- Architect: Claude-Nicolas Ledoux

UNESCO World Heritage Site
- Official name: From the Great Saltworks of Salins-les-Bains to the Royal Saltworks of Arc-et-Senans, the Production of Open-pan Salt
- Type: Cultural
- Criteria: i, ii, iv
- Designated: 1982 (6th session)
- Reference no.: 203bis-001
- Region: Europe and North America
- Extension: 2009

The Saline Royale (Royal Saltworks) is a historical complex at Arc-et-Senans in the department of Doubs commissioned during the reign of Louis XVI (1774-92) and designed by Claude-Nicolas Ledoux.

The complex is listed as a World Heritage Site since 1982. It is notable for being the first major industrial architecture achievement implementing the Enlightenment ideals by improving architectural quality to match those of palaces or religious buildings.

For salt production the Saline Royale used firewood from nearby Forest of Chaux to boil the brine. It was also connected with saltworks of Salins-les-Bains (added in an extension to World Heritage Site in 2009) by a 21 km pipeline carrying the brine.

== Background ==
In the 18th century salt was an essential and valuable commodity. At the time, salt was widely used for the preservation of foods such as meat or fish. The ubiquity of salt use caused the French government to impose the gabelle, a tax on salt consumption. The government mandated that all people over the age of 8 years buy an amount of salt per year at a price that the government had set. The ferme générale was responsible for collecting the gabelle.

As a region, Franche-Comté was relatively well-endowed with salt springs due to subterranean seams of halite. Consequently, there were a number of small salt works, such as those at Salins-les-Bains and Montmorot, that extracted salt by boiling water over wood fires. The salt works stood close to the springs and drew on wood brought from nearby forests. After many years of exploitation, the forests were becoming more and more rapidly denuded, with the result that wood had to be brought from farther and farther away, at greater and greater cost. Furthermore, over time the salt content of the brine was dropping. This led the experts of the ferme générale to consider exploiting even small springs, an initiative that the King's council stopped in April 1773. Part of the problem was that it was impossible to build evaporation buildings because Salins-les-Bains sat in a small valley.

The fermiers généraux decided to explore a more mechanised and efficient method of extraction. The concept was to construct a purpose-built factory near the forest of Chaux in the Val d'Amour, i.e., with the brine was to be brought to the factory by a newly constructed canal.

== Claude Nicolas Ledoux ==
On 20 September 1771, Louis XV appointed Ledoux Commissioner of the Salt Works of Lorraine and Franché-Comté. As Commissioner, Ledoux was responsible for inspecting the different saltworks in eastern France. This gave him an opportunity to see many different saltworks, including those at Salins-les-Bains and Lons-le-Saunier, and to learn from them what one might want if designing a factory from scratch.

Two years later, Madame du Barry supported Ledoux's nomination to membership in the Royal Academie of Architecture. This permitted him to style himself as Royal Architect. (He was already the architect for the ferme générale, the private customs and excise operation that collected many taxes on behalf of the king, under 6-year contracts.) It was on the basis of his positions as Inspector of the Saltworks and as Royal Architect that he received the commission to design the Royal Saltworks at Arc-et-Senans.

=== The first plan ===
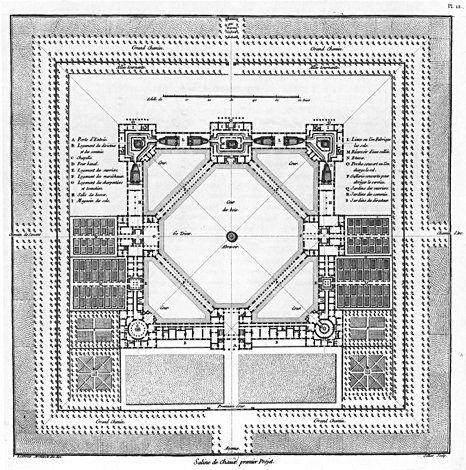
In 1775, the king rejected Ledoux's first design plan.

Without even having received any request from the king, Ledoux decided to design a saltworks. The project was something of an abstraction as he had no site in mind. He presented the resulting project in April 1774 to Louis XV.

Unconstrained by any practical considerations, the project was ambitious, innovative, and a break with traditional approaches. What Ledoux did was to impose a rigid geometry on the overall design. The buildings were placed around the edges of an immense square, and linked to each other by porticoes; no building stood in isolation. To speed connections between buildings, Ledoux introduced covered arcades that linked the midpoints of adjacent sides, forming a square within the square. Columns abounded. The buildings themselves were replete with them, and 144 Doric columns supported the covered arcades.

Ledoux's plan envisaged that the central square courtyard would be where the factory would keep its firewood. At each corner of the square, and at the midpoints of each side stood two-story, square buildings that would house the various parts of the operation. In front were the quarters for the guards, a chapel, and a bakery. On the sides were workshops for the coopers and other workmen. At the base was the factory itself. Gardens were to surround the site to provide the workers with a supplement to their income. Lastly, a wall would surround the entire complex to protect it from theft.

It was the project's grandiose vision that blocked its realization. No industrial building of the period was equally imposing. The king rejected the project. He particularly objected to the extensive use of columns, features that he felt were more appropriate for churches and palaces. He also objected to the chapel being relegated to a corner.

In his own critical review of the project, Ledoux stated that he had put too much weight on the conventions of a factory to the neglect of symbolic aspects. The result was a flat, uniform design based on bi-lateral symmetry, rather than one that would have a marked center of gravity. The design also recalled the traditional communal buildings of the time such as convents, monasteries, hospitals, large farms, and the like. Furthermore, since ancient times, architects had recognized that plans such as Ledoux's were vulnerable to the spread of fire and not very hygienic, with throughout the day some part of the site being in the shade. Lastly, critics pointed out that the project did not take into account the geographic or geological constraints.

=== The second plan ===
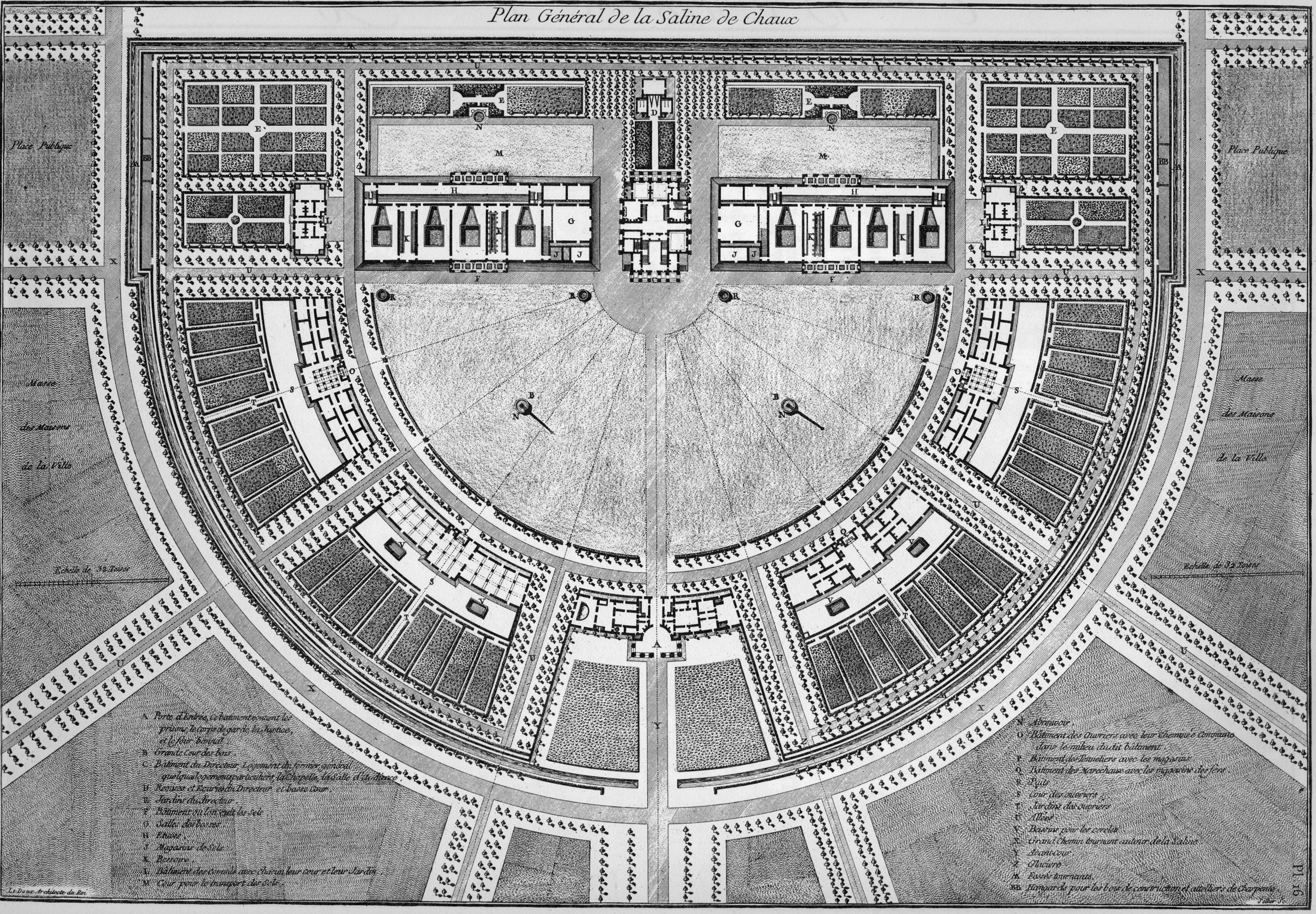
Ledoux's second design plan for Royal Saltworks at Arc-et-Senans

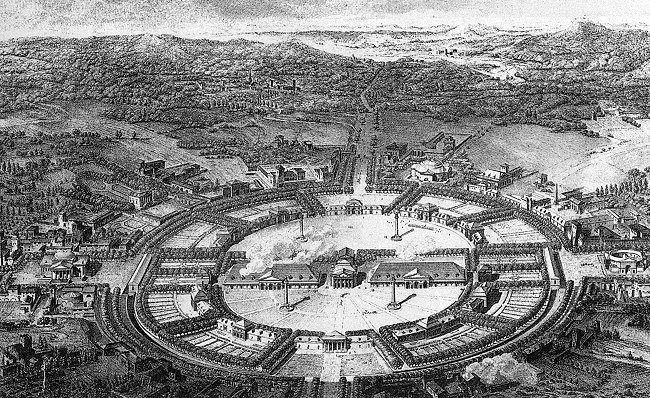
Aerial view of the proposed city at the Royal Saltworks at Arc-et-Senans by Claude Nicolas Ledoux, published in 1804

Ledoux designed the semicircular complex to reflect a hierarchical organization of work. The complete plan included the building of an ideal city forming a perfect circle, like that of the sun. Louis XV had signed the edict authorizing the construction of the saltworks on 29 April 1773, and after approval of Ledoux' second design, construction began in 1775. The city was never started, however. All that was completed was the diameter and a semicircle of buildings of the saltworks.

In the second design, the entrance building sits at the midpoint of the semicircle and contains on one side guardrooms and on the other a prison and a forge. Other buildings on the semicircle include on the left, as one faces the entrance, quarters for carpenters and laborers, and on the right, marshals and coopers. At the center of the circle is the house of the Director, which has a belvedere on top. A monumental staircase led to a chapel that was destroyed by fire in 1918, following a lightning strike. On either side of the Director's house are the saltworks themselves. These two buildings are 80 meters long, 28 meters wide, and 20 meters high. They contain the drying ovens, the heating pots, the "Sales des Bosses", and the salt stores. At each intersection of the diameter and the semicircle sit buildings that housed the works' clerks. Behind the Director's house there is an elegant, small stables for the Director's horses.

The support of salt works by a state monopoly probably explains why this building is so grand. The gabelle was very unpopular and was one of the complaints that led to the French Revolution. The Revolution itself probably curtailed the building of the ideal city.

== Since the end of salt production ==
The salt works produced 40,000 quintals of salt per year at its peak, all of which was exported to Switzerland. All production ceased in 1895 following a lawsuit that the inhabitants of Arc-and-Senans initiated, protesting the pollution of nearby wells. At the same time, the salt works was having difficulty in the face of competition from sea salt brought by rail.

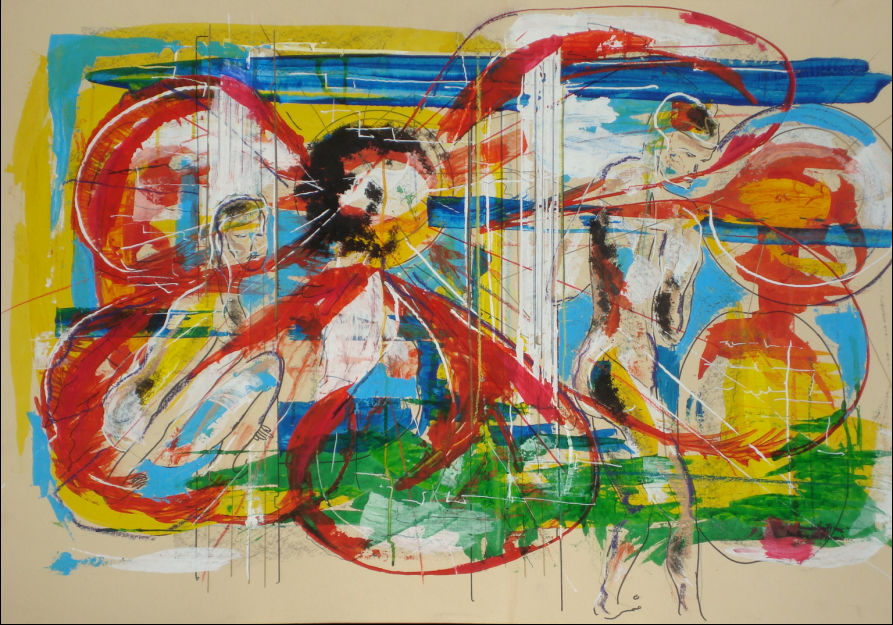
Jeter des Fleurs sur l'Avenir, by the French painter Arnaud Courlet de Vregille, exposed in Royal Saltworks in 2006 for the Claude-Nicolas Ledoux's bicentenary

As mentioned above, a lightning bolt in 1918 destroyed the chapel. In April 1926, some of the buildings were dynamited, and many of the trees on the site were cut down. Still, on November 30, 1926, after a review that began in 1923, the Commission for Monuments declared the central pavilion and the entryway historical monuments. The Society for the Eastern Saltworks, still the owner of the Arc-et-Senans site, was not pleased with the decision. On 10 June 1927 the department of Doubs acquired the salt works and commenced restoration work in 1930.

During 1938, the site housed a camp for Spanish Republican refugees. Then, during October 1939, at the outbreak of World War II, the French military installed an anti-aircraft battery in the courtyard area. Also, a unit of engineers occupied some of the buildings. Still, February 20, 1940, saw the publication of the official announcement of the classification of the salt works and its surrounding wall as historical monuments.

In June 1940, German troops took up residence. From May 1941 to September 1943, the French authorities established an internment camp to hold the area's gypsies and others with no fixed address (Centre de Rassemblement des tziganes et nomades).

After the war, there was an extensive public campaign by artists, journalists and writers from the region to encourage the authorities to protect the site.

The Saltworks were a primary location in the 1961 film directed by Pierre Kast The Season for Love, part of the French New Wave.

In 1965, Marcel Bluwal used the director's house for the tomb of the Commander in his television adaptation of Molière's Dom Juan.

Since 1973, the royal salt works and the Institut Claude-Nicolas Ledoux have been members of the European network of cultural sites. Then in 1982, UNESCO listed the salt works as a World Heritage Site.

== In the new millennium ==
Since June 29, 2009, the salt works at Salins-les-Bains has been added to the listing for Arc-et-Senans in the World Heritage list. It has been the venue for several cultural events and exhibitions in recent years.
