= Liesle =

- Commune
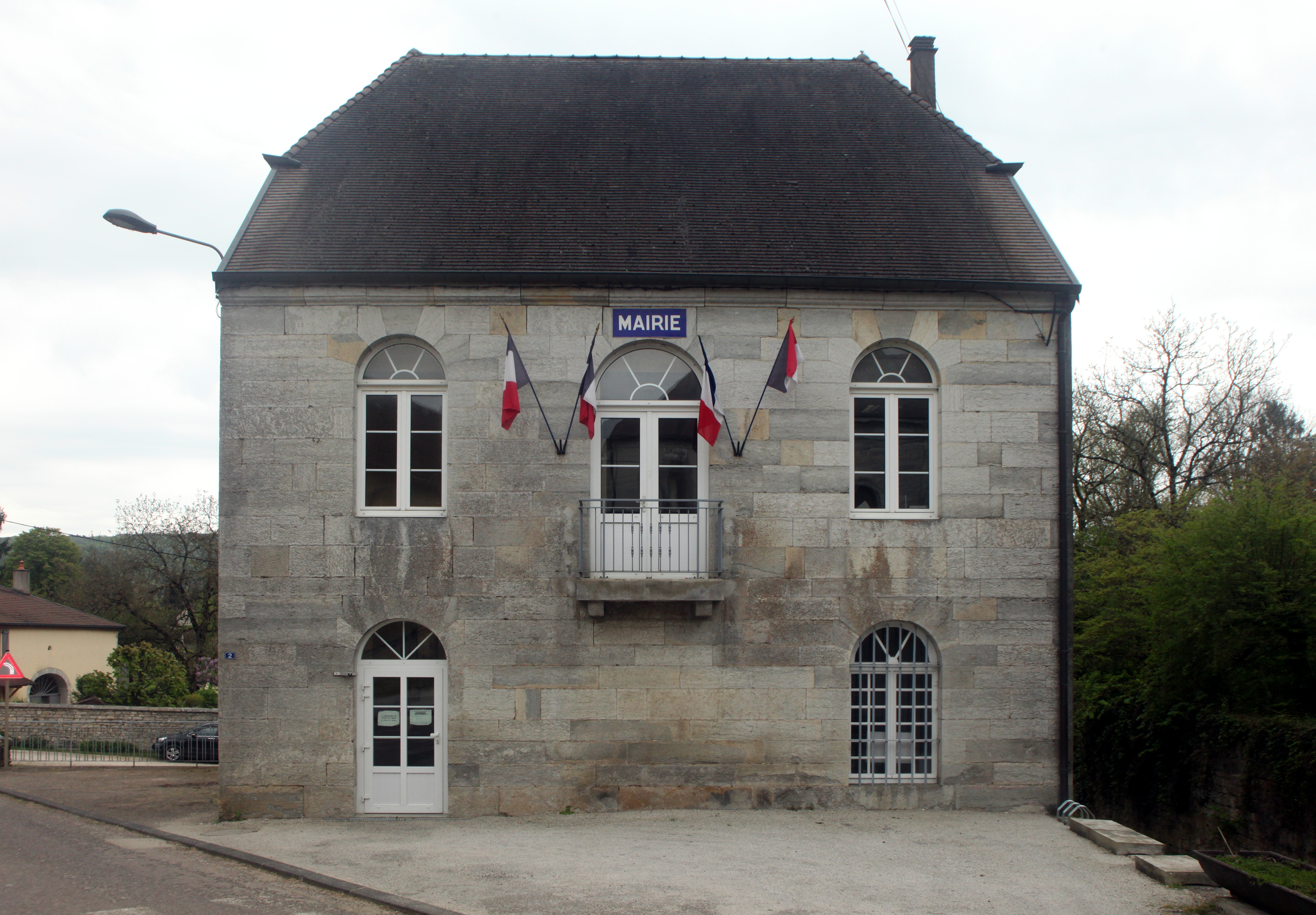
- The town hall in Liesle

- Coat of arms
- Location of Liesle
- Location within France Location within Bourgogne-Franche-Comté
- Coordinates: 47°03′45″N 5°48′56″E
- Country: France
- Region: Bourgogne-Franche-Comté
- Department: Doubs
- Arrondissement: Besançon
- Canton: Saint-Vit
- Intercommunality: Loue-Lison

Government
  - Mayor (2020–2026): Simone Valot
- Area^{1}: 16.54 km^{2} (6.39 sq mi)
- Highest elevation: 462 m (1,516 ft)
- Lowest elevation: 235 m (771 ft)
- Population (2023): 558
  - Density: 33.7/km^{2} (87.4/sq mi)
- Time zone: UTC+01:00 (CET)
  - Summer (DST): UTC+02:00 (CEST)
- INSEE/Postal code: 25336 /25440
- ^{1} French Land Register data, which excludes lakes, ponds, glaciers > 1 km^{2} (0.386 sq mi or 247 acres) and river estuaries.

Liesle (French pronunciation: [ljɛl]) is a commune in the Doubs department in the Bourgogne-Franche-Comté region in eastern France.

== Population ==
Historical population
Year	Pop.	±% p.a.
1968	546	—
1975	503	−1.17%
1982	495	−0.23%
1990	572	+1.82%
1999	552	−0.39%
2007	526	−0.60%
2012	512	−0.54%
2017	533	+0.81%
2023	558	+0.77%
Source: INSEE

== See also ==
- Communes of the Doubs department
