= Dole-Ville station =

Railway station in France

Dole–Ville
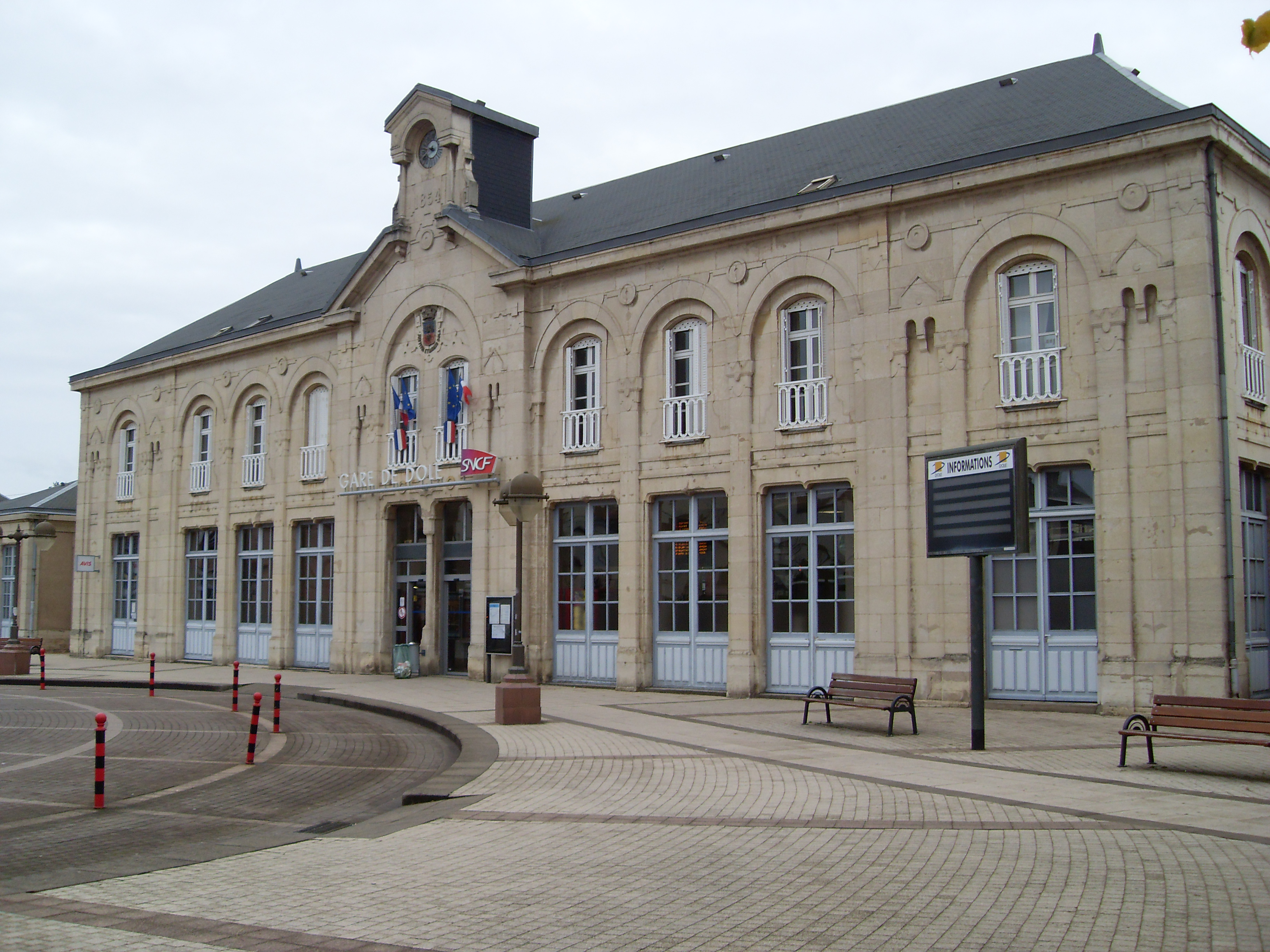
- The station building in 2008

General information
- Location: Dole; France
- Coordinates: 47°05′46″N 5°29′17″E
- Owner: SNCF
- Lines: Dijon–Vallorbe line; Dole–Belfort line; Chagny–Dole line (closed); Dole–Poligny line (closed)
- Distance: 360.5 km (224.0 mi) from Paris-Lyon
- Tracks: 4 + sidings
- Train operators: SNCF; TGV Lyria

Other information
- Station code: 87713412

History
- Opened: 10 June 1855; 171 years ago

Passengers
- 2024: 1,078,716

Services
Preceding station	TGV Lyria	Following station
Dijon-Ville towards Paris-Lyon	Paris to Lausanne	Mouchard towards Lausanne
Preceding station	SNCF	Following station
Dijon-Ville towards Paris-Lyon	TGV	Besançon-Viotte Terminus
Preceding station	TER Bourgogne-Franche-Comté	Following station
Terminus	TER	Montbarrey towards Pontarlier
Auxonne towards Dijon	TER	Orchamps towards Besançon
Location

Dole-Ville station is a railway station located in Dole, Jura, eastern France. The station was opened on 10 June 1855 and is located on the Dole–Belfort and Dijon–Vallorbe lines. The train services are operated by SNCF.

== Services ==
The following services stop at Dole-Ville:

- TGV Lyria: high-speed service between Paris-Lyon and Lausanne.
- SNCF TGV: high-speed service between Paris-Lyon and Besançon-Viotte.
- TER Bourgogne-Franche-Comté:
  - regional service between Dijon-Ville and Besançon-Viotte.
  - regional service to Pontarlier.
