= Loue =

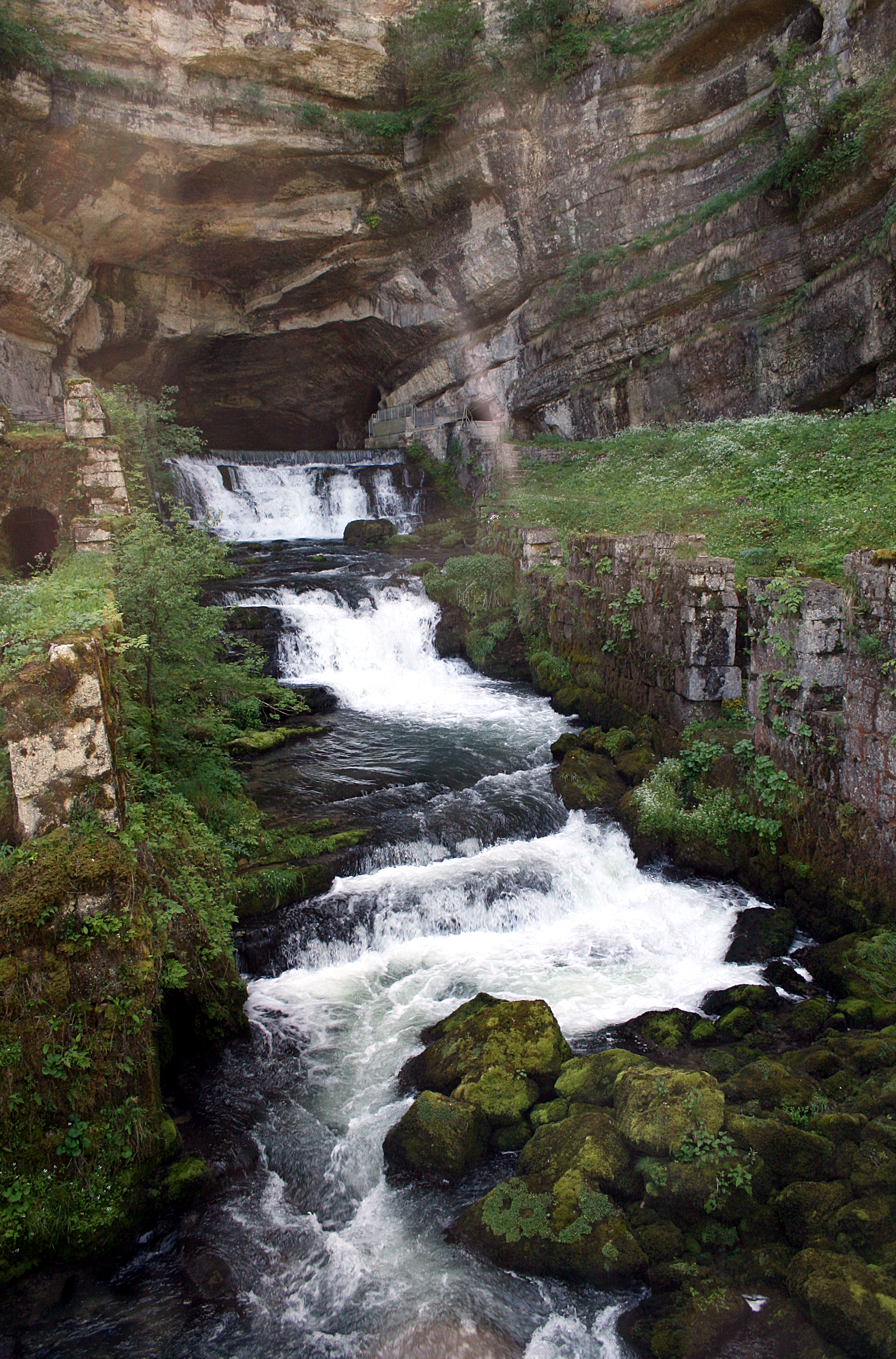
- The source of the Loue, showing karst formations

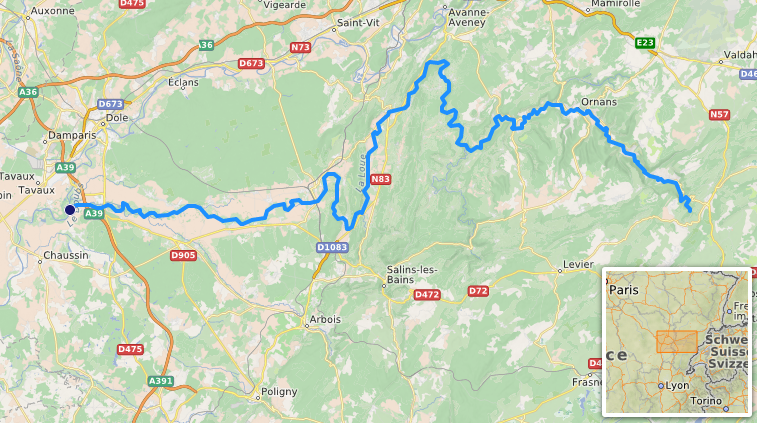
- Course of the Loue interactive map

Location
- Country: France

Physical characteristics
- Source
  - location: Jura Mountains
  - coordinates: 47°0′39″N 6°17′57″E
  - elevation: 528 m (1,732 ft)
- Mouth
  - location: Doubs
  - coordinates: 47°0′47″N 5°26′55″E
- Length: 122 km (76 mi)
- Basin size: 1,760 km^{2} (680 sq mi)
- Discharge
  - average: 59 m^{3}/s (2,100 cu ft/s)

Basin features
- Progression: Doubs→ Saône→ Rhône→ Mediterranean Sea

The Loue (French pronunciation: [lu]) is a river of eastern France, a left tributary of the Doubs, which it joins downstream of Dole. It is 122 km (76 mi) long. Its source is a karst spring in the Jura Mountains near Ouhans, which at least partly receives its water from the Doubs. This connection with the Doubs was discovered in 1901 when a spillage from the Pernod factory into the Doubs was transmitted into the Loue.

The Loue flows through the following departments and towns:

- Doubs: Ornans, Quingey
- Jura: Montbarrey
