= Dijon–Vallorbe railway =

Railway line in France

Dijon–Vallorbe
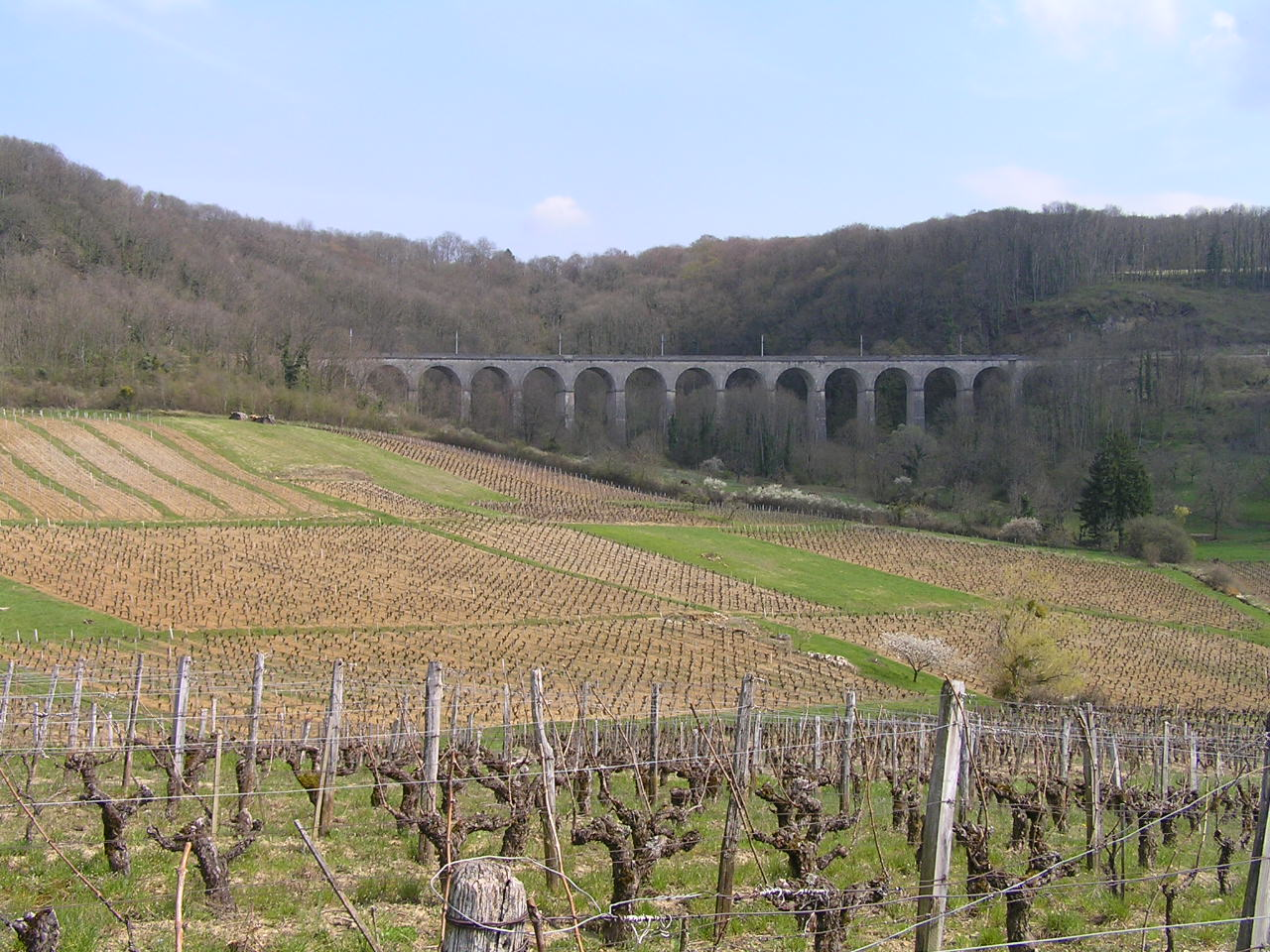
- The viaduct of Montigny-lès-Arsures in 2006

Overview
- Owner: SNCF
- Termini: Dijon-Ville; Vallorbe

Service
- Route number: 850 (SNCF)

Technical
- Line length: 147.4 km (91.6 mi)
- Track gauge: 1,435 mm (4 ft 8 1/2 in) standard gauge
- Electrification: 25 kV 50 Hz (Dole–Vallorbe); 1,500 V DC (Dijon–Dole)

The Dijon–Vallorbe railway is a railway line in the Bourgogne-Franche-Comté region of France. It runs 147.4 kilometres (91.6 mi) from Dijon to Vallorbe, on the Franco-Swiss border.
