= Chalon-sur-Saône =

- Subprefecture and commune
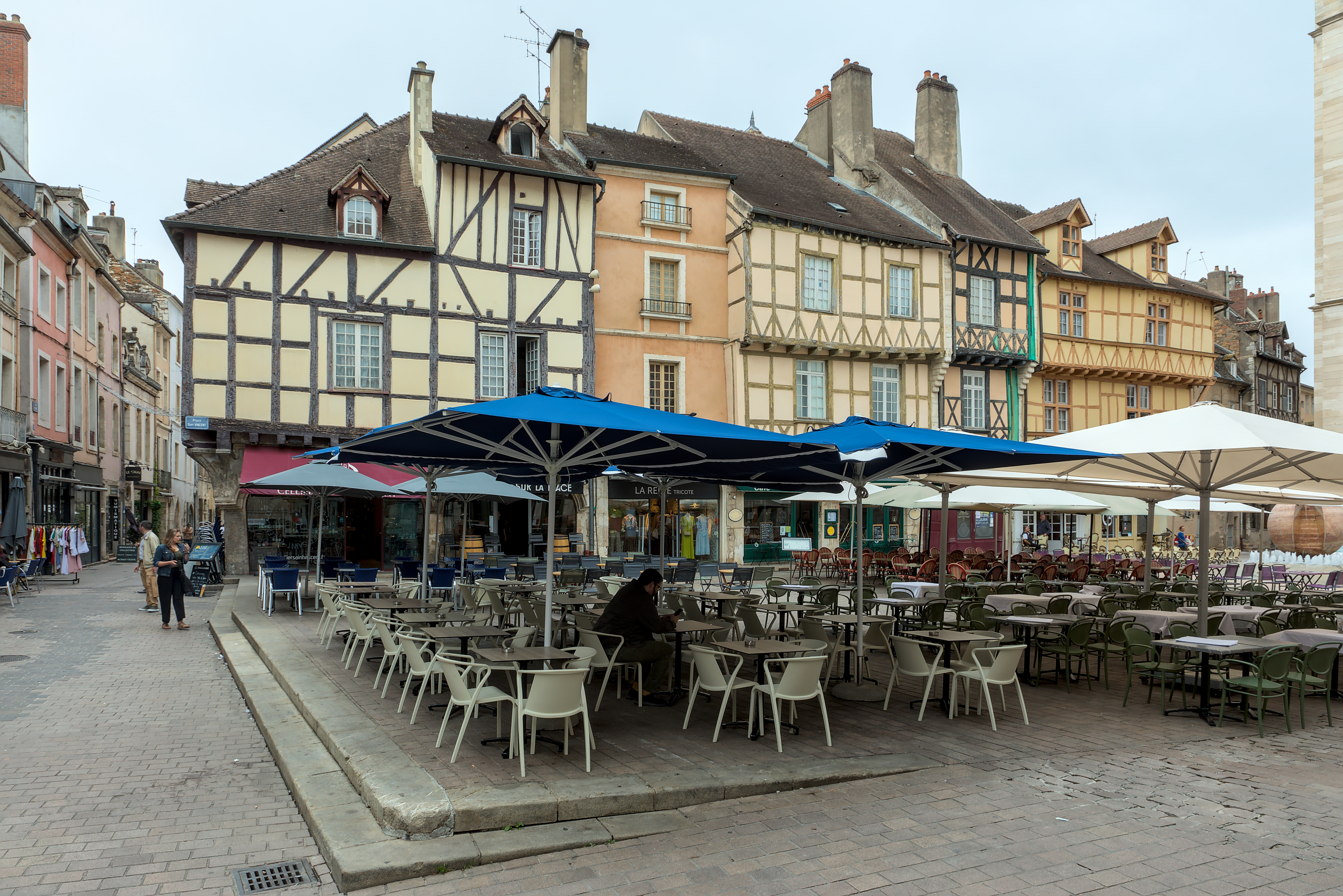
- Place Saint-Vincent, a square in the historic center

- Coat of arms
- Location of Chalon-sur-Saône
- Location within France Location within Bourgogne-Franche-Comté
- Coordinates: 46°46′50″N 4°51′10″E
- Country: France
- Region: Bourgogne-Franche-Comté
- Department: Saône-et-Loire
- Arrondissement: Chalon-sur-Saône
- Canton: Chalon-sur-Saône-1, 2 and 3
- Intercommunality: CA Le Grand Chalon

Government
  - Mayor (2026–2032): Gilles Platret
- Area^{1}: 15.22 km^{2} (5.88 sq mi)
- Elevation: 185 m (607 ft)
- Highest elevation: 190 m (620 ft)
- Lowest elevation: 172 m (564 ft)
- Population (2023): 45,102
  - Density: 2,963/km^{2} (7,675/sq mi)
- Time zone: UTC+01:00 (CET)
  - Summer (DST): UTC+02:00 (CEST)
- INSEE/Postal code: 71076 /71100
- ^{1} French Land Register data, which excludes lakes, ponds, glaciers > 1 km^{2} (0.386 sq mi or 247 acres) and river estuaries.

Chalon-sur-Saône (French pronunciation: [ʃalɔ̃ syʁ son], literally Chalon on Saône) is a city in the Saône-et-Loire department in the region of Bourgogne-Franche-Comté in eastern France.

It is a sub-prefecture of the department. It is the largest city in the department; however, the department capital is the smaller city of Mâcon.

== Geography ==
Chalon-sur-Saône lies in the south of the Bourgogne-Franche-Comté and in the east of France, approximately 55 km (34 mi) north of Mâcon. It is located on the Saône river, and was once a busy port, acting as a distribution point for local wines which were sent up and down the Saône river and the Canal du Centre, opened in 1792.

== History ==
=== Ancient times ===
Though the site (ancient Cabillonum) was a capital of the Aedui and objects of La Tène culture have been retrieved from the bed of the river here, the first mention of Cavillonum is found in Commentarii de Bello Gallico (VII, chs. 42 and 90). The Roman city already served as a river port and hub of road communications, of the Via Agrippa and side routes. In 354 AD the Roman Emperor Constantius II stationed the Roman 7th Army in Chalon (then called Cabyllona) for an invasion against the brother kings, Gundomadus and Vadomarius of the Alamanni. However, not having received supplies, the Roman troops revolted, and were pacified by the grand chamberlain Eusebius with money. In Late Antiquity the city had dwindled so much that a wall round it encircled fifteen hectares.

=== Christian centre ===
Marcel de Chalon (Saint Marcel) is said to have been martyred here in 179. Chalon became one of the de facto capitals of the kingdom of Burgundy under Guntram, king from 561 to 592, who died here. Guntram also promoted the cult of Marcel. It continued to pay for its importance by being frequently attacked until the 10th century.

The Ancient Diocese of Chalon-sur-Saône, a suffragan bishopric of the Archdiocese of Lyon, was also established here in the 6th century, and a Church Council was held here from 644–655. After the French Revolution, in accordance with the Concordat of 1801, the diocese of Chalon was amalgamated with the diocese of Autun, which gave the name to the new entity.

=== Modern developments ===
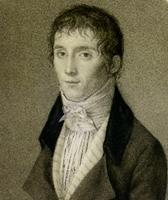
Nicéphore Niépce

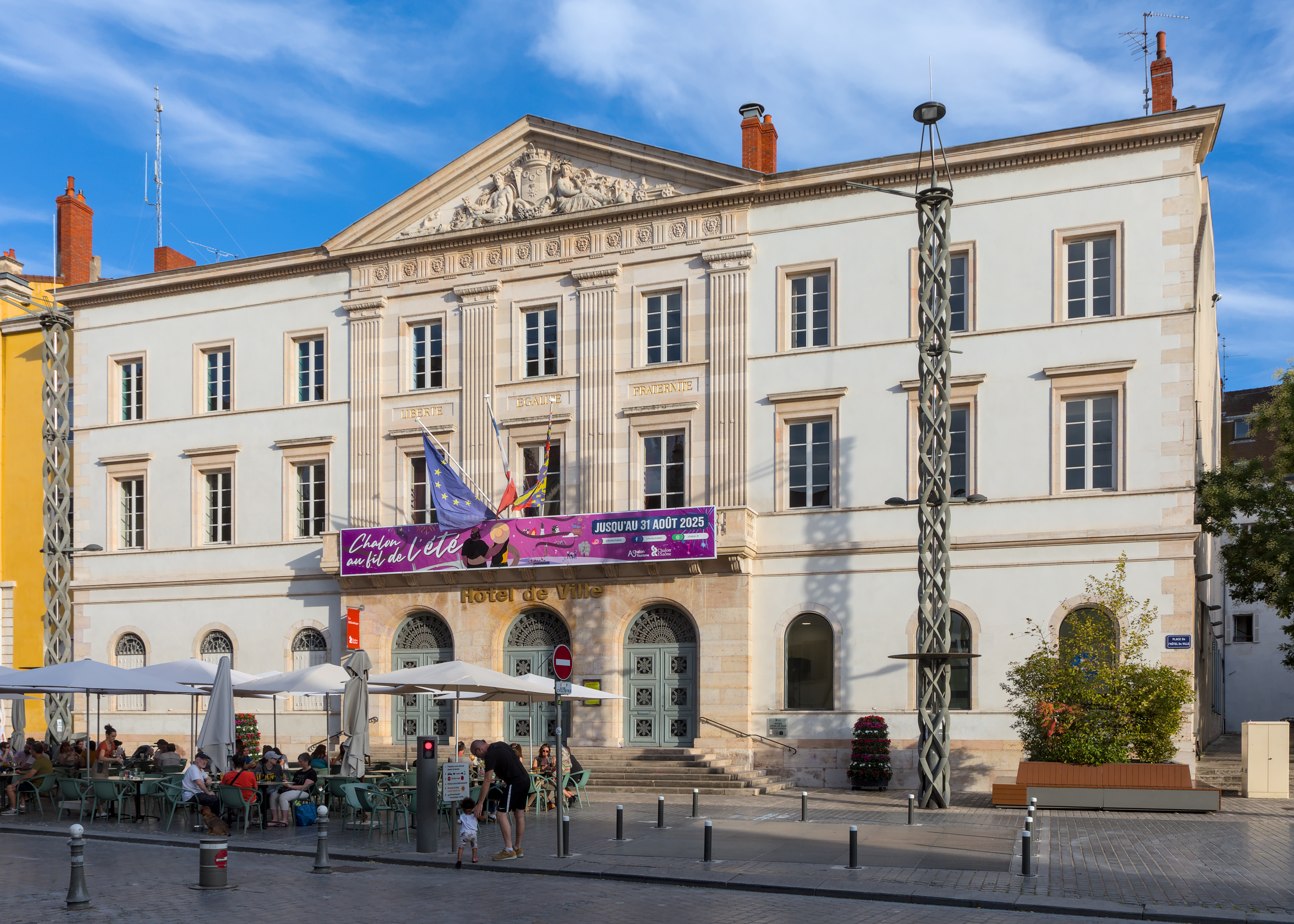
The Hôtel de Ville

Chalon in the 19th century is best known as the birthplace of photography. Its most famous resident, Nicéphore Niépce, also has a lycée (secondary school) named after him. There is a museum which contains some early photography relics, located on the Quai des Messageries in the town, containing more than two million photographs and many old artefacts such as cameras and other equipment for old and modern photography. Also on display are Niépce's 1807 Pyréolophore, which is probably the world's first internal combustion engine, plus his 1818 implementation of a dandy horse, for which he coined the word vélocipède.

Another famous resident is Dominique Vivant Denon (1747–1825), who was involved in the creation of the Louvre museum, converting the former royal palace into a museum after the French Revolution.

The Hôtel de Ville was completed in 1845.

In the late 19th century, copper and iron works were the town's main industry. The large engineering works of Petit-Creusot, a branch of those of Le Creusot, manufactured heavy industrial items.

== Population ==
Historical population

Year	Pop.	±% p.a.
1793	8,798	—
1800	10,431	+2.46%
1806	11,204	+1.20%
1821	10,952	−0.15%
1831	12,338	+1.20%
1836	14,810	+3.72%
1841	17,240	+3.09%
1846	19,878	+2.89%
1851	20,403	+0.52%
1856	21,062	+0.64%
1861	20,896	−0.16%
1866	21,247	+0.33%
1872	21,756	+0.40%
1876	20,895	−1.00%
1881	21,618	+0.68%
1886	22,768	+1.04%
1891	24,686	+1.63%
1896	26,288	+1.27%
1901	29,058	+2.02%

Year	Pop.	±% p.a.
1906	29,951	+0.61%
1911	31,550	+1.05%
1921	31,609	+0.02%
1926	31,500	−0.07%
1931	32,533	+0.65%
1936	33,201	+0.41%
1946	32,683	−0.16%
1954	37,399	+1.70%
1962	43,655	+1.95%
1968	50,589	+2.49%
1975	58,187	+2.02%
1982	56,194	−0.50%
1990	54,575	−0.36%
1999	50,124	−0.94%
2007	46,676	−0.89%
2012	44,564	−0.92%
2017	45,096	+0.24%
2023	45,102	+0.00%

Source: EHESS and INSEE (1968–2023)

== Economy ==
The primary industries are nuclear, plastics, metallurgy, and mechanics.

The Chamber of Commerce of Saône-et-Loire manages the École de Gestion et de Commerce de Chalon-sur-Saône, as well as the river port on the Saône.

There are 2,472 businesses: 764 stores, 454 retail services, 409 schools and health and social services, 378 wholesale services, 122 construction companies, 69 agricultural and alimentary businesses, 64 real estate businesses, 60 transportation business, 49 industries de biens intermédiaires, 35 industries de biens de consommations, 34 entreprises d'énergie, 33 industries de biens d'équipements et 1 industrie automobile.

The most important companies are Framatome (formerly Areva), Saint-Gobain, Nordeon, Cartonnerie Laurent, Chalondis, Carrefour 2000, Géant Casino, Comptoirs des Fers, Cayon, Amazon and Le journal de Saône-et-Loire. Until the early 2000s, Kodak was the largest employer in town. Their production site became the campus of Le Grand Chalon en Bourgogne in 2005.

== Transport ==
=== Railway ===
The Gare de Chalon-sur-Saône railway station offers connections with Paris, Dijon, Lyon and several regional destinations.

The station is located along the PLM mainline from Paris Gare de Lyon to Marseille-Saint-Charles, at kilometre post 382.150 from Paris.

=== Road ===
The primary national roads serving Chalon are the A6 autoroute from Paris to Lyon, the route nationale 73, from Chalon to Besançon and the route nationale 80, from Chalon to Montchanin.

The city is also located on the pan-European bicycle route the EuroVelo 6, which stretches from Saint-Nazaire on the Atlantic Ocean near Nantes to Constanta on the Black Sea.

=== Air transport ===
The closest major commercial airport is Lyon-Saint-Exupéry, located about 120 kilometres away.

=== Public transport ===
The public transportation company STAC offers a bus network ZOOM, including a free bus in the center, lines to surrounding communities, and services for disabled riders. There also exists a bike sharing scheme Réflex.

== Culture ==
St. Vincent's Cathedral on the Place Saint-Vincent which, while dating mainly from the 12th to the 15th centuries, has some elements dating from the eighth century and a neo-gothic nineteenth century façade.

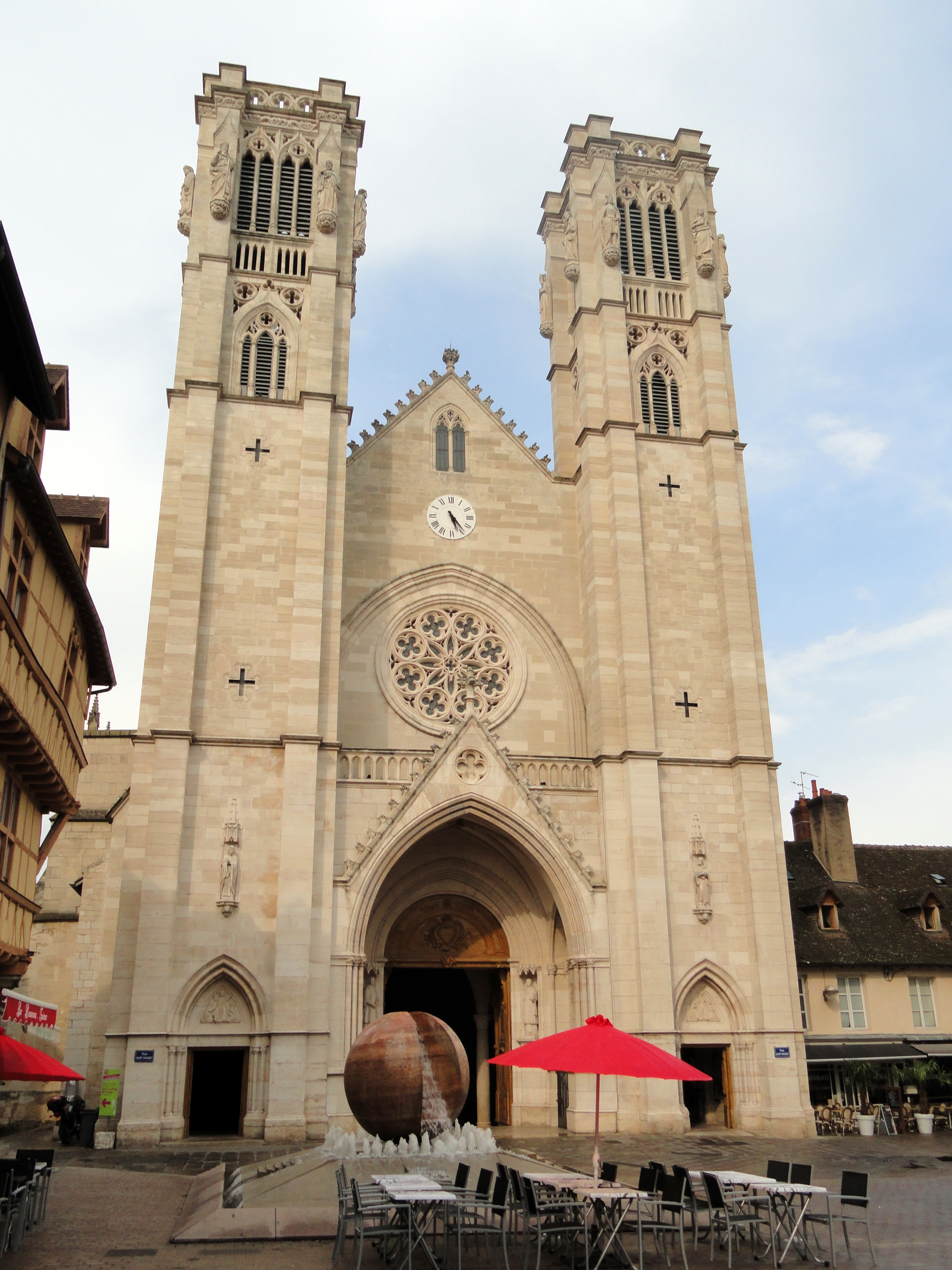
Chalon Cathedral

The church of St Pierre, with two steeples, dates from the late 17th century.

The city square also has a number of cafés and a busy market on Fridays and Sundays.

Every year in July, Chalon-sur-Saône hosts an international street artists festival, called Chalon dans la Rue ("Chalon in the street"). Over four days, artists from across Europe and beyond come to the streets of Chalon to perform, mostly for free, in music, theatre, acrobatics, comedy, etc. A program is made available by the town, so people know of the main groups performing, and several newspapers report what performances are must-see and where and when to find them.

=== Education ===
An institute of research of the engineering school Arts et Métiers ParisTech was established in Chalon in 1997. This institute offers graduate and doctoral programs in the domain of virtual reality and image engineering.

It includes a municipal library.

=== Sports ===
The Élan Chalon basketball club is a member of the LNB Pro A, and plays its home matches at the Le Colisée. Other sports clubes include FC Chalon, HBC Chalon-sur-Saône, Volley-Ball Chalon-sur-Saône and the former RC Chalon.

== Notable people ==
Notable people associated with the city include:

- Joseph Touchemoulin (1727–1801), composer
- Dominique Vivant Denon (1747–1825), involved in creating the Louvre
- Roger Grosjean (1920–1975), double agent in World War II and later a noted archaeologist in Corsica
- Eugène Genet (1850–1904), politician
- Jean-Baptiste Leschenault de La Tour (1773–1826), botanist and ornithologist
- Robert Marchi (1919–1946), World War II fighter ace
- Nicéphore Niépce, (1765–1833), pioneer of photography, took the earliest surviving photograph
- Jean Baptiste Félix Descuret (1795–1871), physician and writer
- Omer Letorey (1873–1938), composer

== Tourism ==
- The Arboretum de Pézanin, one of the richest tree collections in France,
- The Rock of Solutré
- Cluny abbey, and its medieval city
- Charolles and the "bœuf charolais"
- Mâcon, Paray-le-Monial

== International relations ==
Chalon-sur-Saône is twinned with:

- Saint Helens, United Kingdom
- Solingen, Germany
- Novara, Italy

== Climate ==
Climate data for Chalon-sur-Saône (1991–2020 normals, extremes 1991–present)
Month	Jan	Feb	Mar	Apr	May	Jun	Jul	Aug	Sep	Oct	Nov	Dec	Year
Record high °C (°F)	17.9 (64.2)	20.4 (68.7)	24.5 (76.1)	27.9 (82.2)	32.3 (90.1)	37.0 (98.6)	39.0 (102.2)	39.7 (103.5)	34.3 (93.7)	28.9 (84.0)	21.5 (70.7)	17.7 (63.9)	39.7 (103.5)
Mean daily maximum °C (°F)	6.2 (43.2)	8.2 (46.8)	12.9 (55.2)	16.7 (62.1)	20.8 (69.4)	24.6 (76.3)	26.7 (80.1)	26.5 (79.7)	22.0 (71.6)	16.6 (61.9)	10.3 (50.5)	6.7 (44.1)	16.5 (61.7)
Daily mean °C (°F)	3.0 (37.4)	4.1 (39.4)	7.5 (45.5)	10.6 (51.1)	14.6 (58.3)	18.3 (64.9)	20.2 (68.4)	19.9 (67.8)	16.0 (60.8)	11.8 (53.2)	6.6 (43.9)	3.6 (38.5)	11.4 (52.5)
Mean daily minimum °C (°F)	−0.2 (31.6)	0.0 (32.0)	2.0 (35.6)	4.5 (40.1)	8.4 (47.1)	12.0 (53.6)	13.8 (56.8)	13.3 (55.9)	9.9 (49.8)	7.0 (44.6)	2.9 (37.2)	0.5 (32.9)	6.2 (43.2)
Record low °C (°F)	−13.5 (7.7)	−13.7 (7.3)	−12.4 (9.7)	−6.2 (20.8)	−1.5 (29.3)	1.6 (34.9)	4.8 (40.6)	3.6 (38.5)	−1.1 (30.0)	−7.6 (18.3)	−10.4 (13.3)	−17.6 (0.3)	−17.6 (0.3)
Average precipitation mm (inches)	53.6 (2.11)	43.0 (1.69)	44.0 (1.73)	58.4 (2.30)	73.4 (2.89)	58.3 (2.30)	67.5 (2.66)	57.9 (2.28)	63.7 (2.51)	77.8 (3.06)	79.6 (3.13)	59.3 (2.33)	736.5 (29.00)
Average precipitation days (≥ 1.0 mm)	9.9	7.9	8.4	9.1	10.0	8.0	8.2	7.3	7.6	9.8	10.5	10.6	107.2
Source: Meteociel

== See also ==
- Élan Sportif Chalonnais
- Communes of the Saône-et-Loire department
- Côte Chalonnaise
- Neuilly sa mère !, 2009 film set partially in Chalon-sur-Saône
