= Athée, Côte-d'Or =

Athée
- Commune
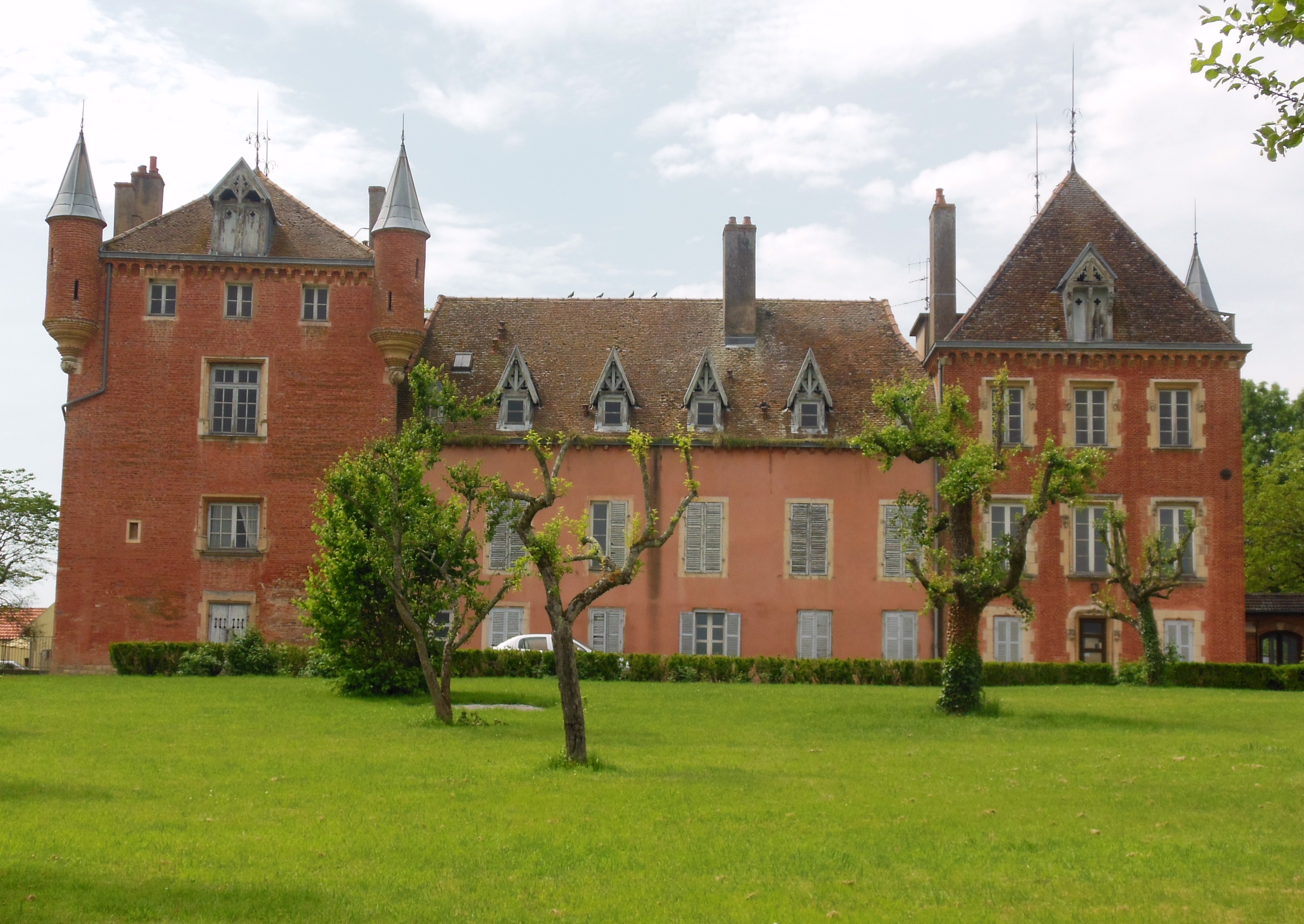
- The Château of Athée

- Coat of arms
- Location of Athée
- Location within France Location within Bourgogne-Franche-Comté
- Coordinates: 47°13′51″N 5°22′20″E
- Country: France
- Region: Bourgogne-Franche-Comté
- Department: Côte-d'Or
- Arrondissement: Dijon
- Canton: Auxonne
- Intercommunality: CC Auxonne Pontailler Val Saône

Government
  - Mayor (2020–2026): Gilbert Mazaudier
- Area^{1}: 9.43 km^{2} (3.64 sq mi)
- Elevation: 203 m (666 ft)
- Highest elevation: 232 m (761 ft)
- Lowest elevation: 182 m (597 ft)
- Population (2023): 815
  - Density: 86.4/km^{2} (224/sq mi)
- Time zone: UTC+01:00 (CET)
  - Summer (DST): UTC+02:00 (CEST)
- INSEE/Postal code: 21028 /21130
- ^{1} French Land Register data, which excludes lakes, ponds, glaciers > 1 km^{2} (0.386 sq mi or 247 acres) and river estuaries.

Athée (French pronunciation: [ate]) is a commune in the Côte-d'Or department in the Bourgogne-Franche-Comté region of eastern France.

== Geography ==
Athée is located in the Natural Region of Val de Saône immediately north of Auxonne and south of Poncey-lès-Athée. Access to the commune is by the D24 road from Auxonne which passes through the length of the commune and the village and continues north-west to Magny-Montarlot. The D976 comes from Poncey-lès-Athée in the north and passes through the village continuing south-west to join Route Nationale 5 west of Auxonne.

The first phase of the LGV Rhin-Rhône (140 km long) between Villers-les-Pots (Côte-d'Or) and Petit-Croix (Territoire de Belfort), opened in 2011, traverses the commune but there is no station. The nearest railway stations are at Villers-les-Pots (3 km) and Tillenay station at Auxonne (5 km), both on the Dijon to Vallorbe line.

The west and north-west of the commune are heavily forested with the rest of the commune farmland.

The Saône river forms the eastern border of the commune and there are drainage Ditches in the forests (Grande Bois Defendu and Bois des Noues) and Canal pounds in the south of the commune.

Geologically, Athée is on the Bresse Graben in the Saône Plain. The soil is sandy clay.

== Toponymy ==
The name Athée comes from the Latin Attegiae, meaning "huts" or "Shepherd's cabins" which constituted the original village. Depending on the time and the writer the village has been called:

- Attegiae and Ateiae (7th century),
- Ateias (9th century),
- Attegia (11th century),
- Ateae (12th century),
- Atheae and Athées (13th century),
- Estées (14th century),
- Athée (16th century),
- Attée (17th century),
- Athé and Athey (18th century),
- Athée (since 1750).

== History ==
The oldest mention of Athée recognised by the majority of historians was in 679 in a Charter of the Cartulary of the Abbey Saint-Bénigne of Dijon.

The Lordship of Athée - consisting of Athée, Poncey, the "Grange Lochère" located at the end of a bridge over the Saône, and Auxonne, as well as Magny-lès-Auxonne 4, was probably founded in the early High Middle Ages.

It is located on Holy Roman Empire land and is one of the three territories which were fiefs of Saint-Seine-sur-Vingeanne depending on the County of Auxonne, run by counts for the monks of the priory of Saint-Vivant-en-Amous. The Lord of Athée was the vassal of Saint-Seine who was himself a vassal of the Count of Auxonne who in turn was a vassal of the monks of Saint-Vivant, who were vassals of the Emperor of the Holy Roman Empire

From 1237 the Count of Auxonne was replaced in the chain of vassalage by the Duke of Burgundy following an exchange of lands between Hugh IV, Duke of Burgundy and John, Count of Chalon.

From 1366 to the French Revolution the Lordship of Athée was held by co-lords who were canons of Sainte-Chapelle de Dijon on the one hand and Lay Lords (the Laverne, Senevoy, Moussier families) on the other.

In 1516 the lordship became subject to the Kingdom of France and depended on the bailiwick of Auxonne and the Généralité de Bourgogne (Generality of Burgundy).

Between 1790 and 1794 Athée, separately from Poncey and Magny, became a French commune depending on the Canton of Auxonne, the district of Saint-Jean-de-Losne, and the department of Côte-d'Or.

Since 1801 the commune has depended on the Canton of Auxonne, the Arrondissement of Dijon, the department of Côte-d'Or, and, since 1960, the region of Burgundy.

Until 1790 Athée was the seat of a Rector and the patron was the Sacristan of Dijon Cathedral depending primarily on the Deanery of Oscheret, then the Archpriest of Genlis of the Diocese of Chalon.

Today Athée is part of the parish of Auxonne, the deanery of Vingeanne-Saône, and the Diocese of Dijon.

=== Historical highlights ===
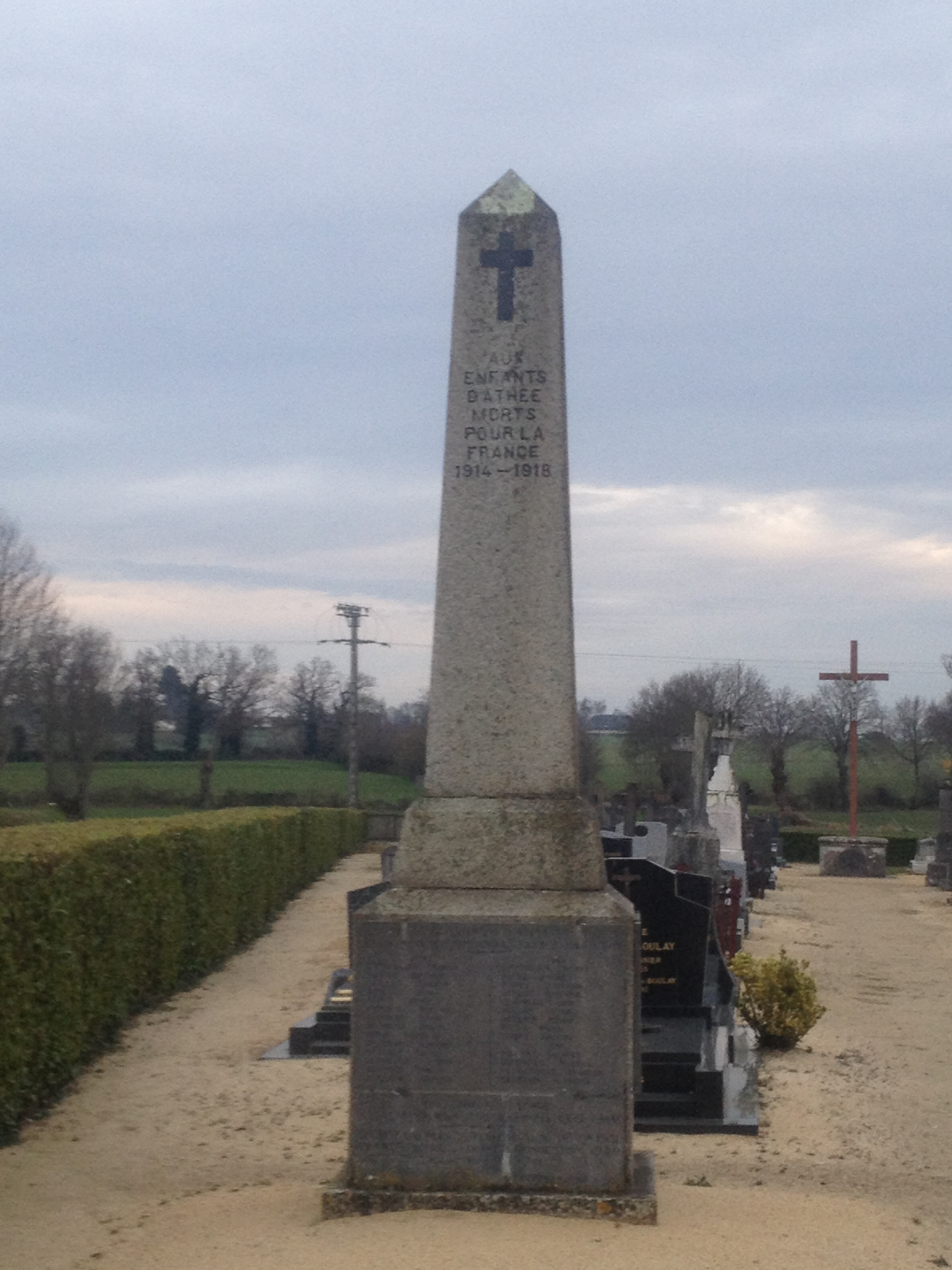
War memorial

- c. 1450: the building the "Old Chateau" of Athée.
- 1516: Athée becomes French.
- 1674: King Louis XIV came to besiege the county capital, Dole. His wife, Queen Maria Theresa of Spain and his son Louis, Grand Dauphin of France spent the night at the house of the Count de Moussier - the "Old Chateau" of Athée to avoid the plague then raging in Auxonne.
- 1793: Athée becomes a commune.
- 1856–1857: Reconstruction of the Church of the Nativity of Our Lady keeping the choir from the 13th century.
- 1868: building of the boys' school which is now the town hall.
- 1875: foundation of the Athée retirement home by Victor and Fanny Moussier.
- 1877 and 1885: two fires ravaged the village.
- 1915: Athée was occupied by the Corps expéditionnaire d'Orient (Oriental Expeditionary Force) before their embarkation at the military quay in Villers-les-Pots.

== Administration ==
List of successive mayors

From	To	Name
2001	2008	Jean-Louis Martin
2008	2020	Serge Perron
2020	2026	Gilbert Mazaudier

== Demography ==
The inhabitants of the commune are known as Athéens or Athéennes in French.

Historical population

Year	Pop.	±% p.a.
1793	463	—
1821	467	+0.03%
1846	509	+0.35%
1872	509	+0.00%
1901	521	+0.08%
1926	441	−0.66%
1946	482	+0.45%
1962	472	−0.13%
1968	499	+0.93%

Year	Pop.	±% p.a.
1975	531	+0.89%
1982	610	+2.00%
1990	593	−0.35%
1999	600	+0.13%
2007	751	+2.85%
2012	780	+0.76%
2017	781	+0.03%
2023	815	+0.71%

Source: EHESS and INSEE

== Lieux et monuments ==
- A Château (probably 15th century), called "Vieux-Château" (Old Chateau), Rue du Centre;
- 3 Wayside Crosses (19th century), Rue de l'Église, Rue du Centre, and Rue de la Saône;
- A Girls' School (19th century), today a house, Rue du Centre;
- The Church of Notre-Dame-de-la-Nativité (19th century with a choir from the 13th century), Rue de l'Église;
- A Lavoir (Public laundry) (19th century), Rue de l'Égalité;
- The Town Hall (19th century), Rue de l'Égalité;
- A Retirement home "Les Logis du Parc Victor et Fanny Moussier" (1875), Rue du Centre;
- A Weighbridge (20th century), Rue du Centre/Rue de la Bascule;
- The War Memorial (20th century), Rue de l'Église;
- 2 Wells, Rue de l'Égalité and Rue du Centre;

The Church of Notre-Dame-de-la-Nativité contains the Tombstone of Guillaume Bouot (16th century) which is registered as a historical object.

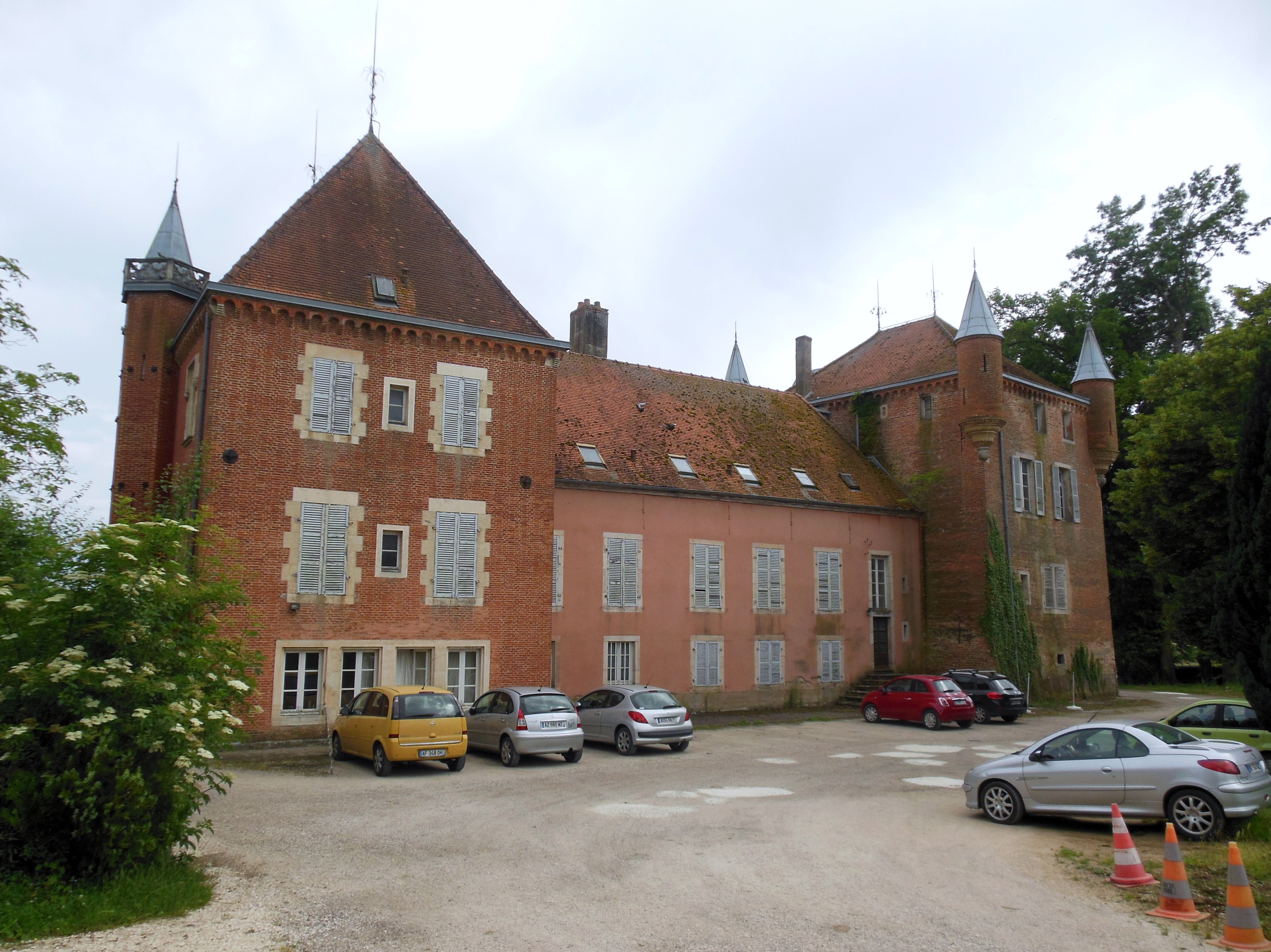
The "Old château", side courtyard

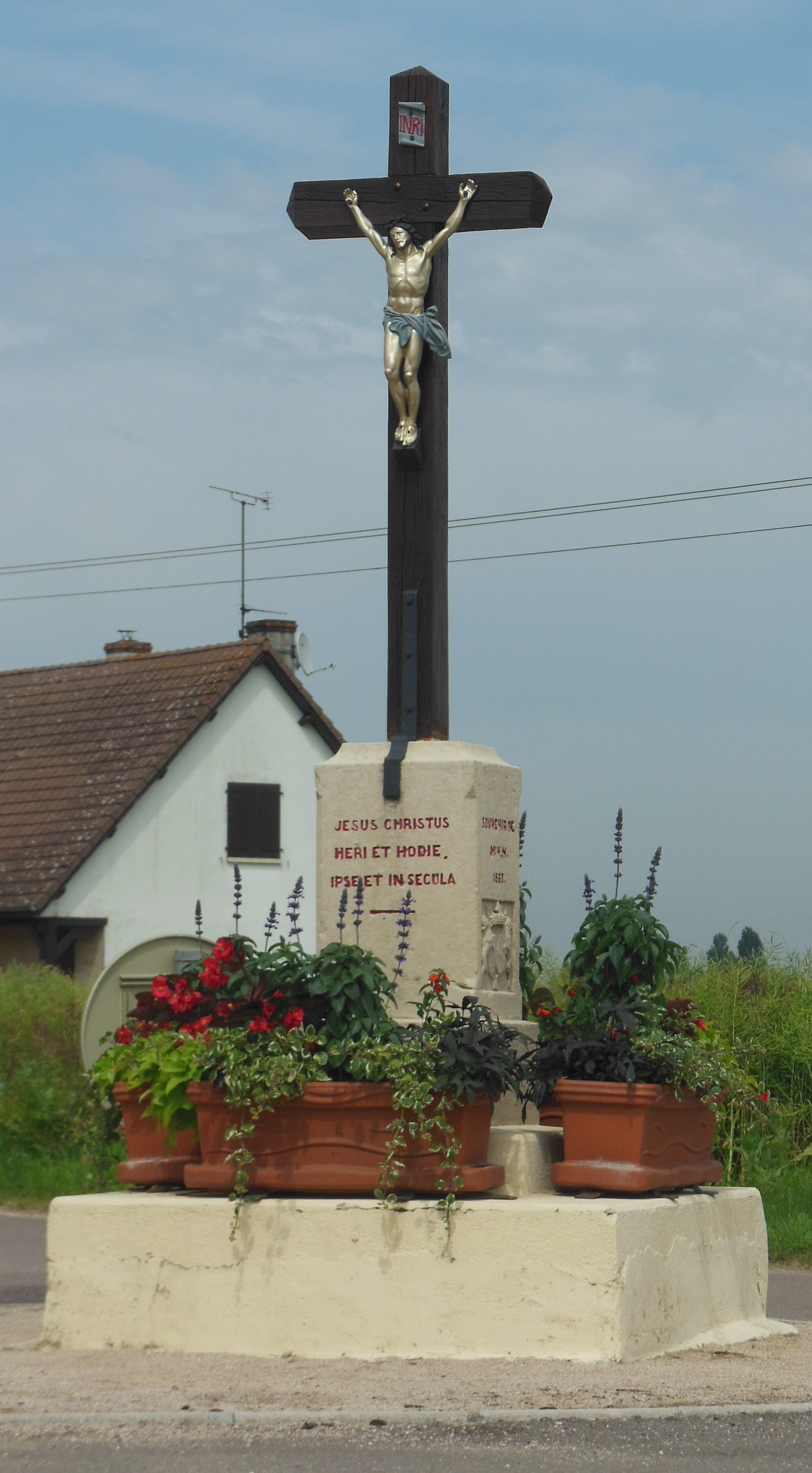
Wayside Cross, Rue de Saône

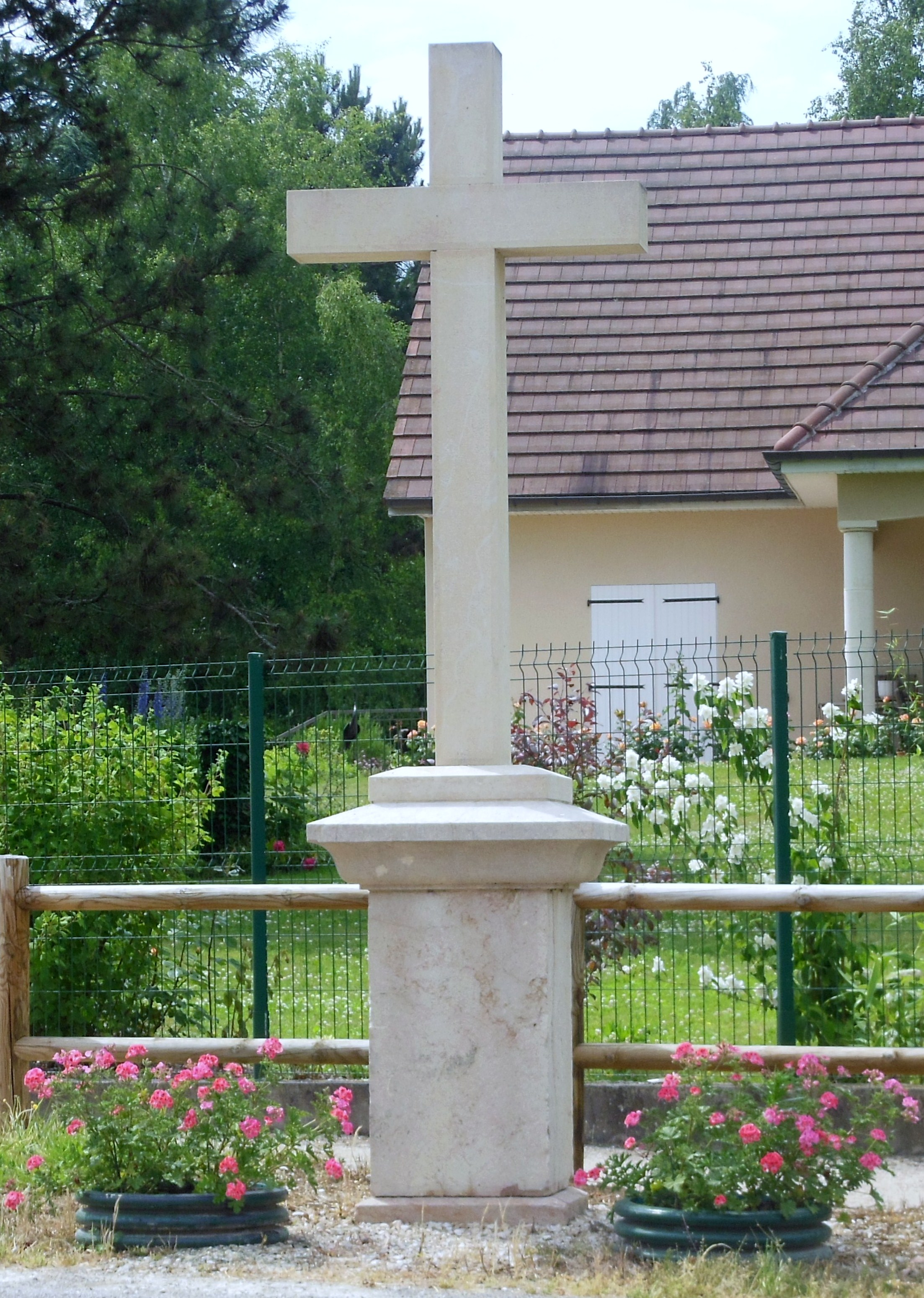
Wayside Cross, Rue du Centre

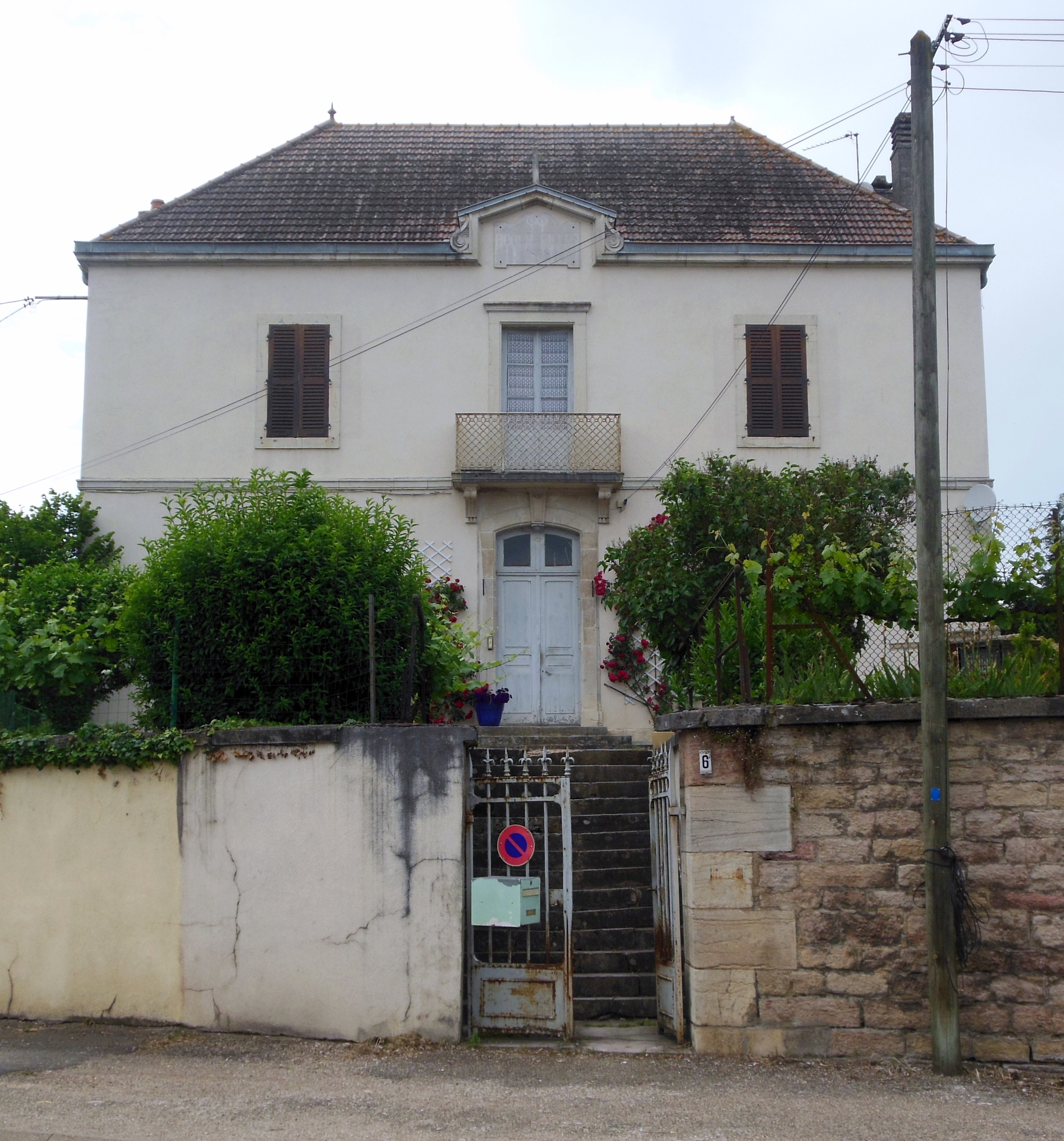
Old Girls' School

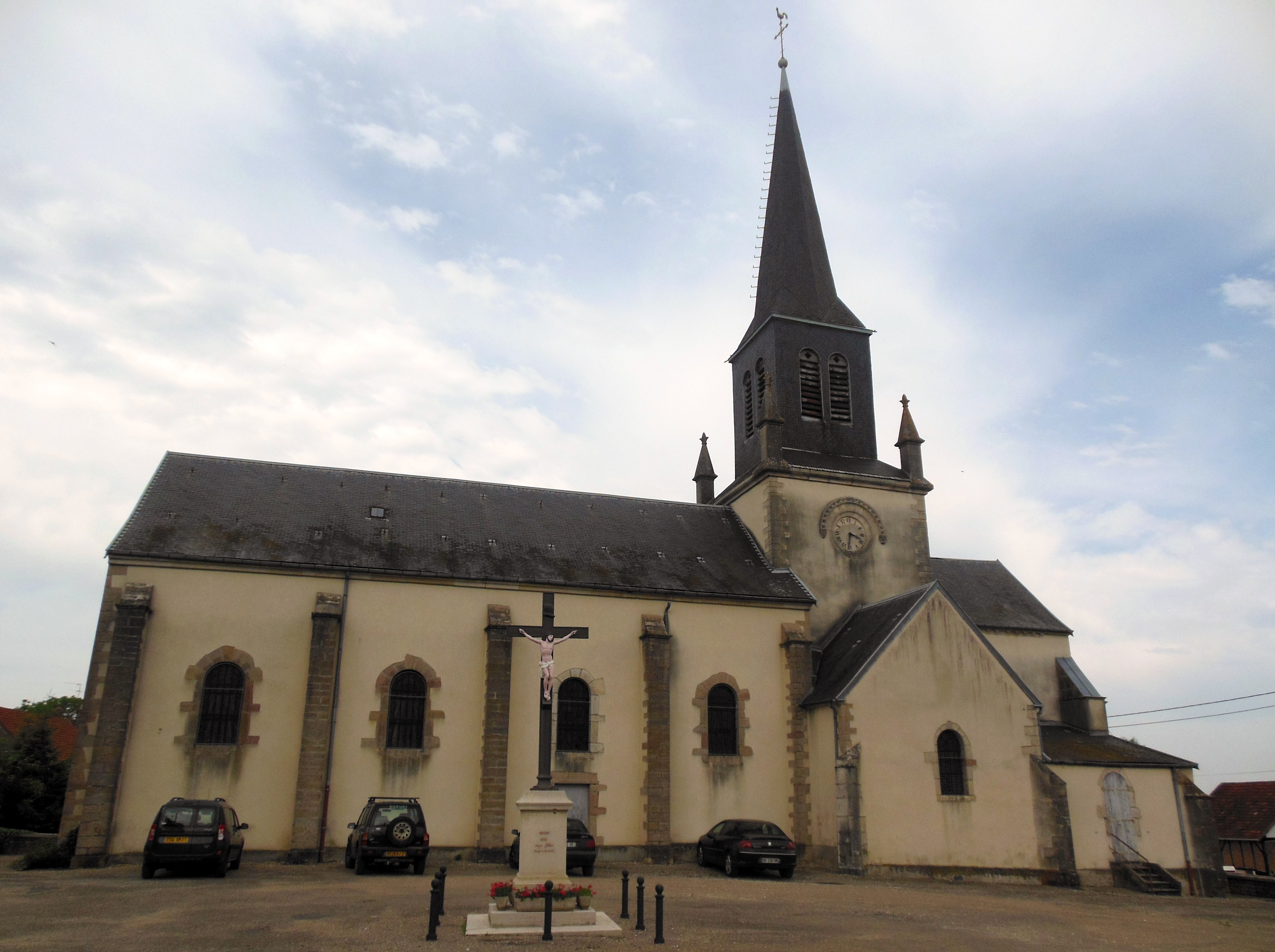
Church of Notre-Dame-de-la-Nativité

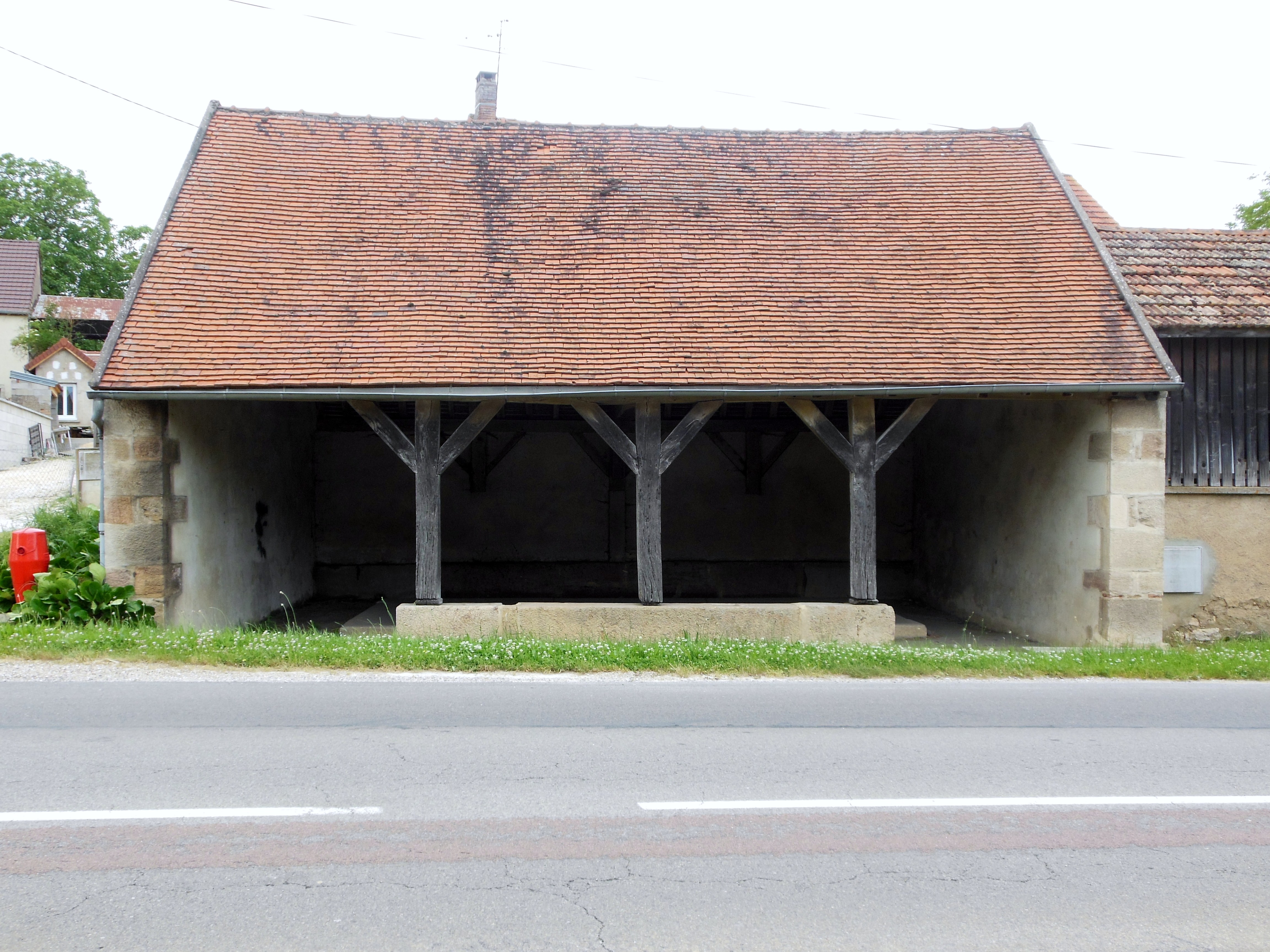
Lavoir (Public laundry)

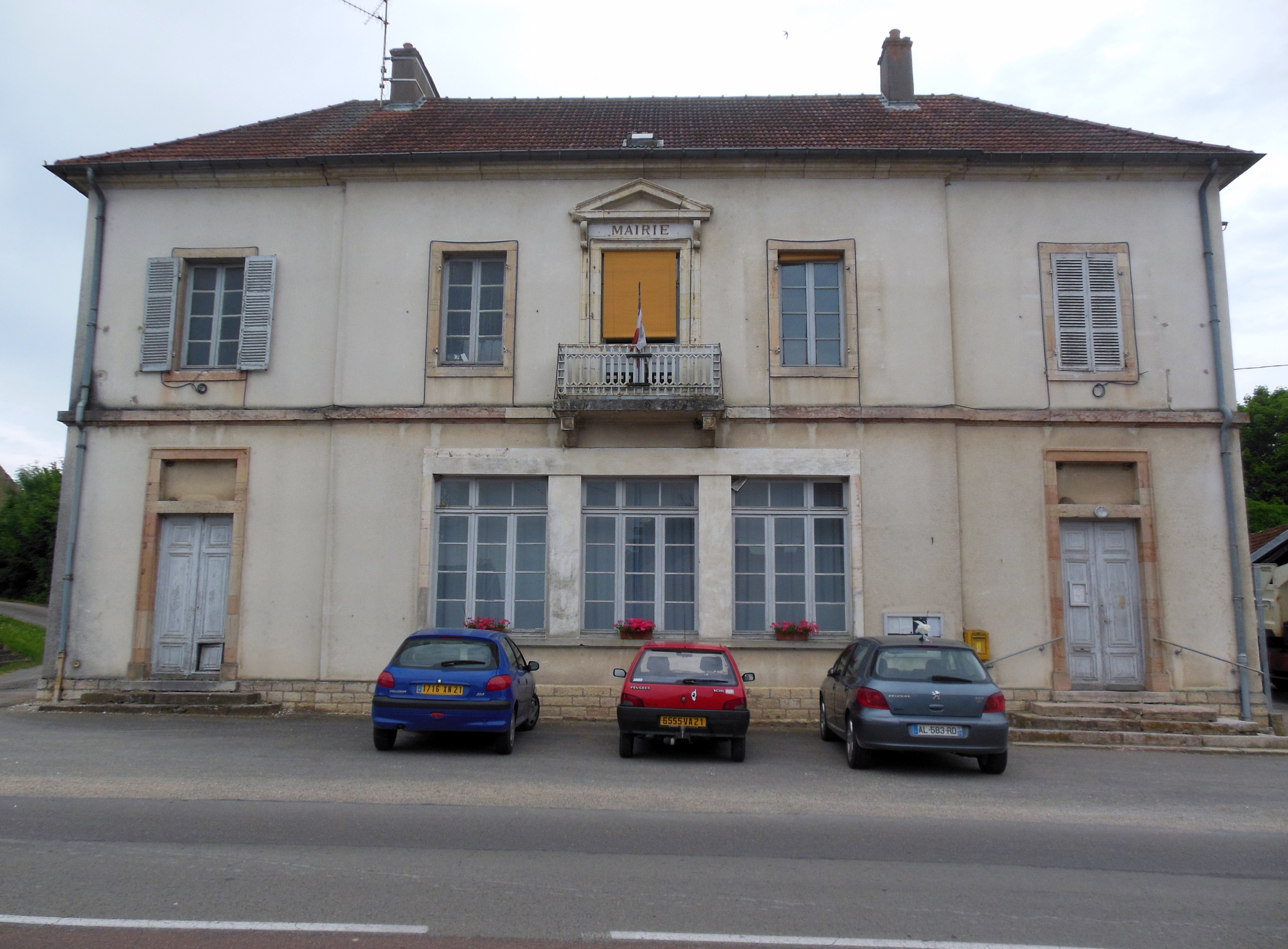
The Town Hall

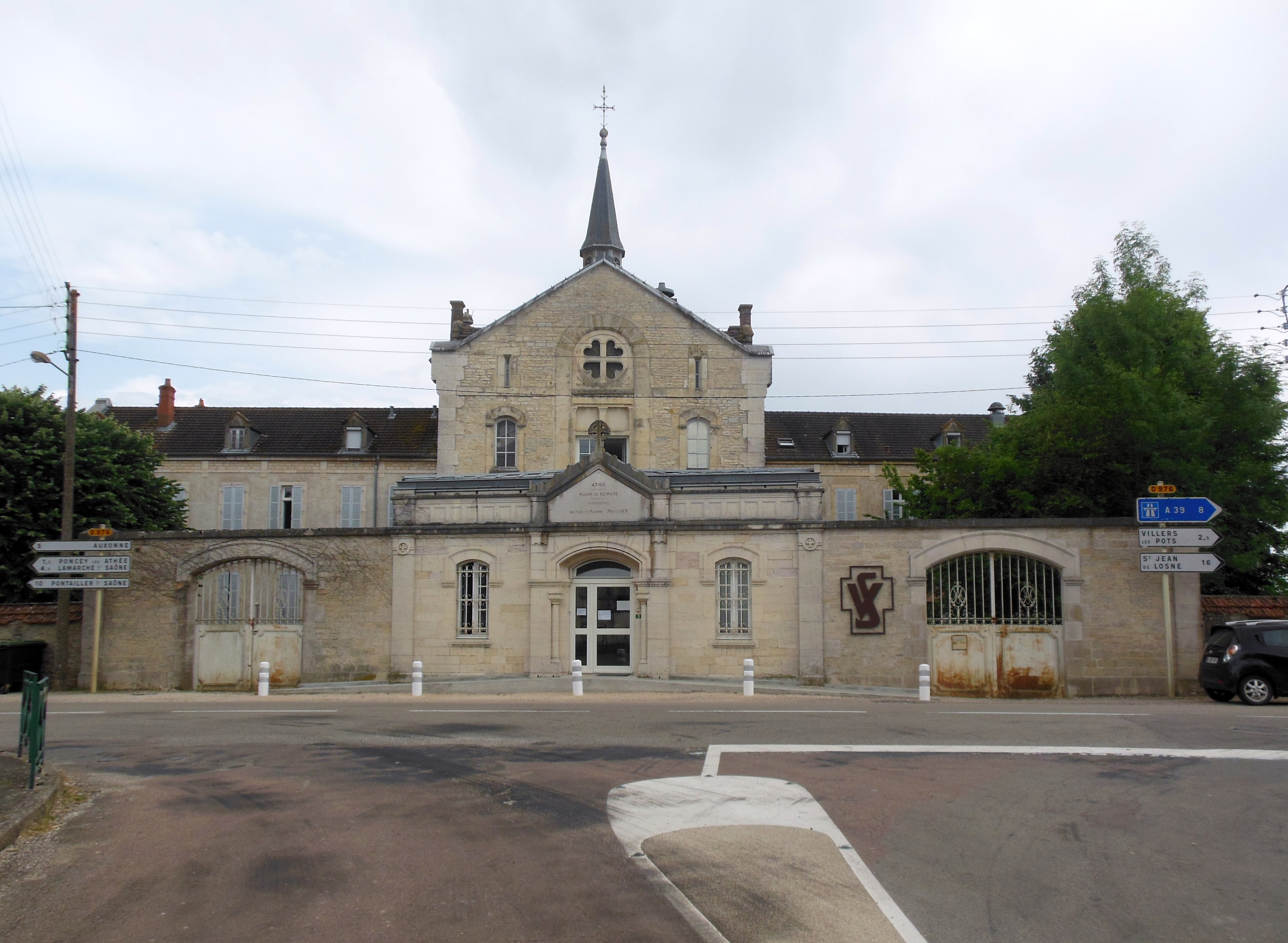
The Retirement home

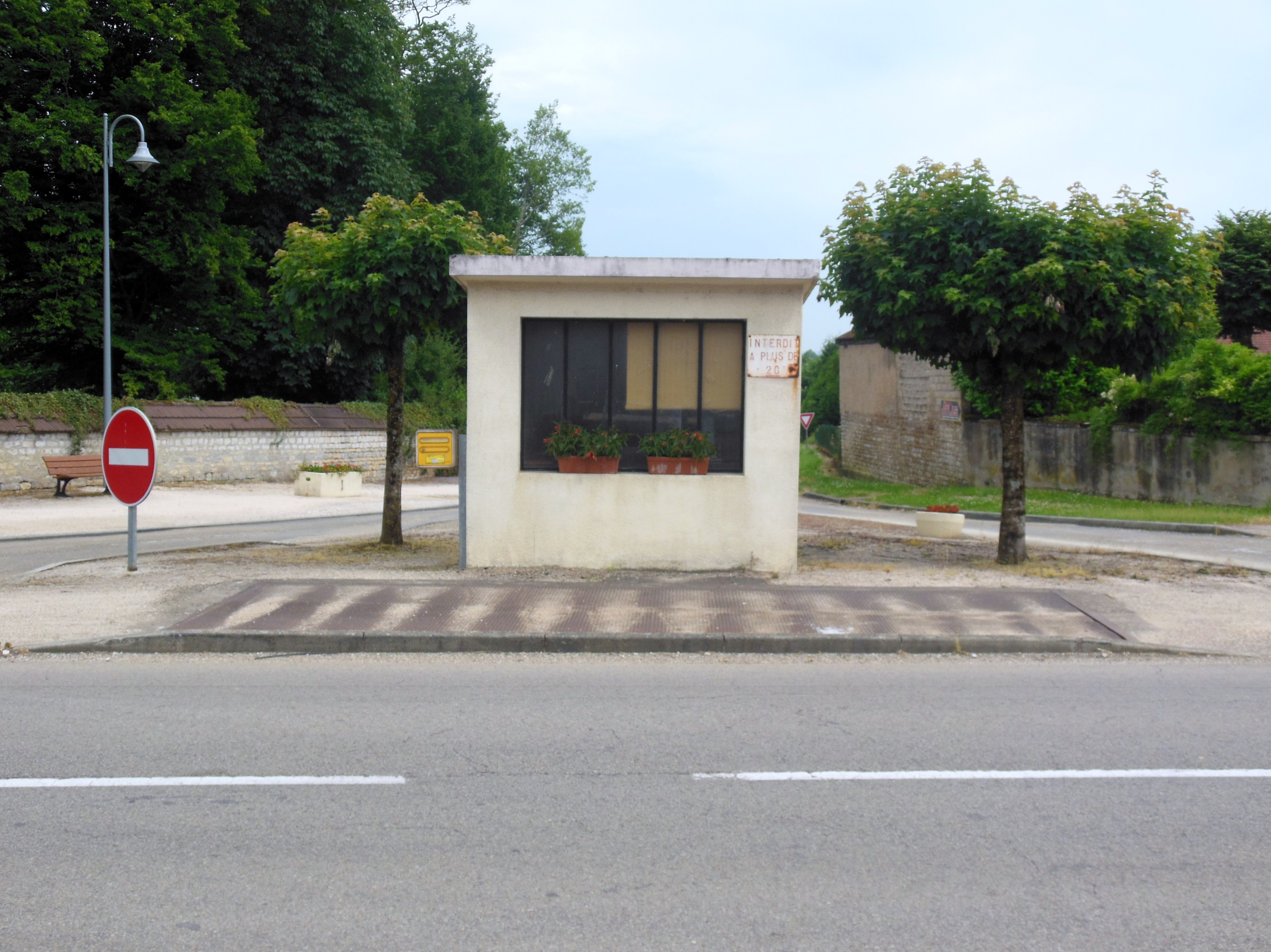
The weighbridge

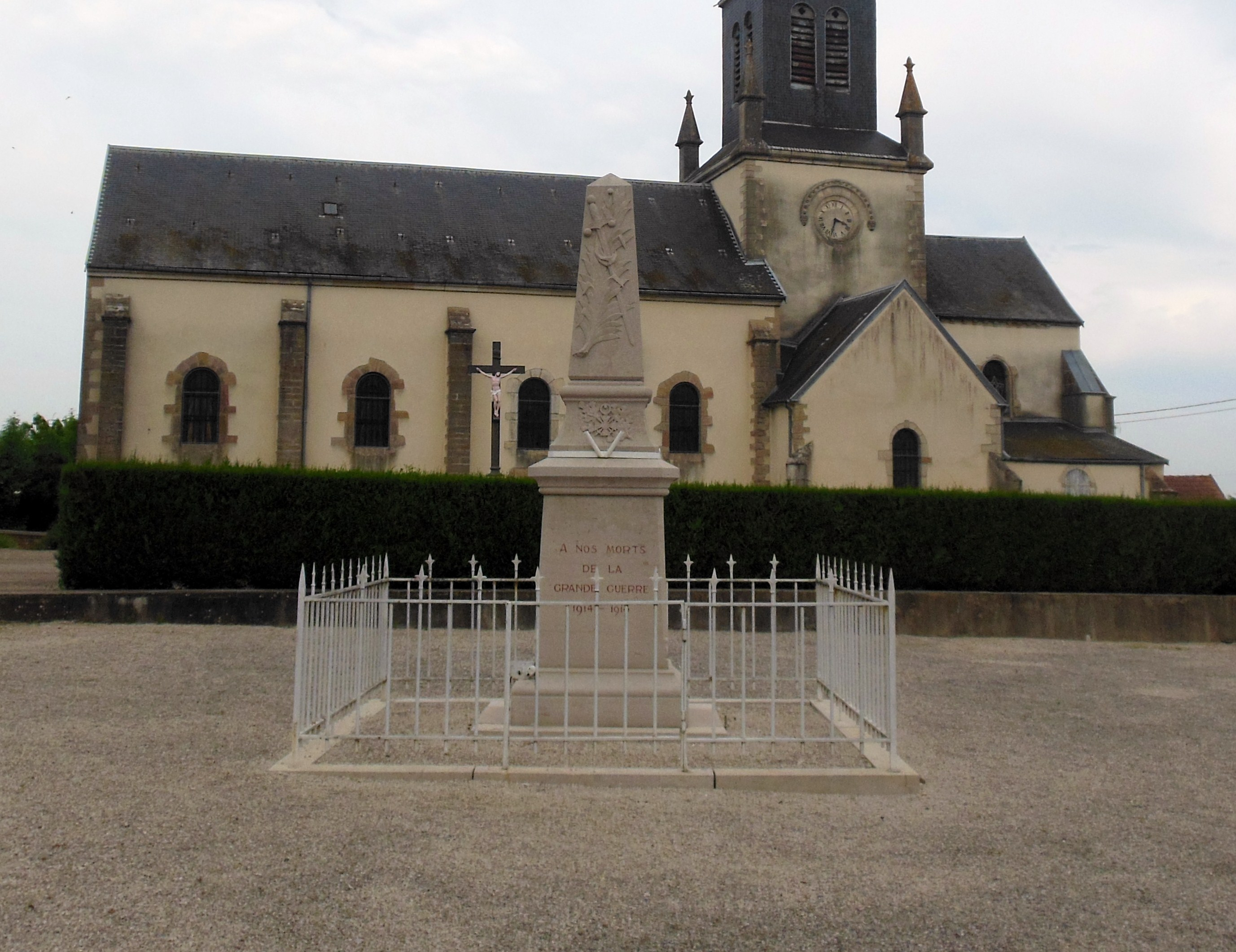
The War Memorial

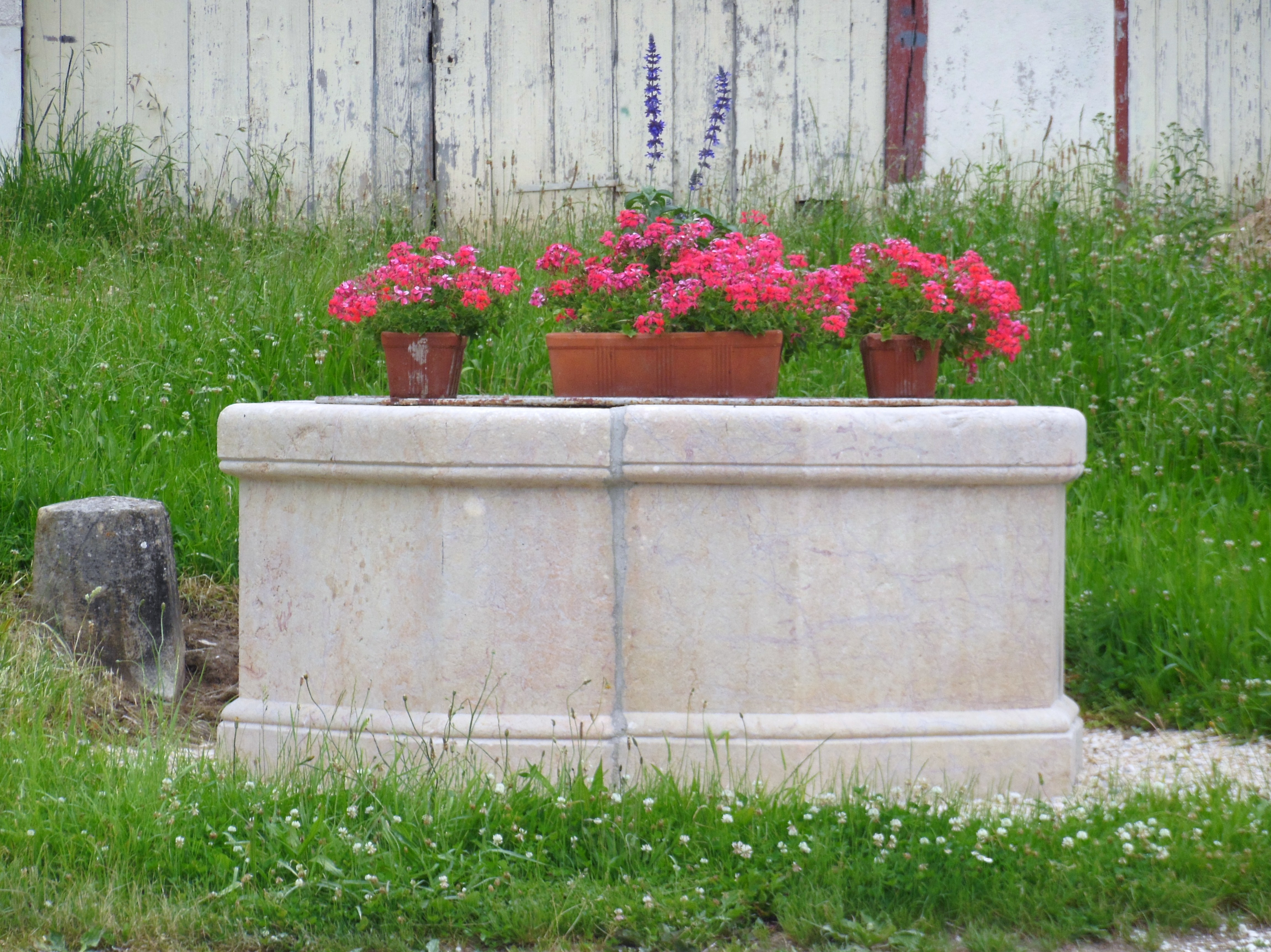
Well 1, Rue de l'Égalité

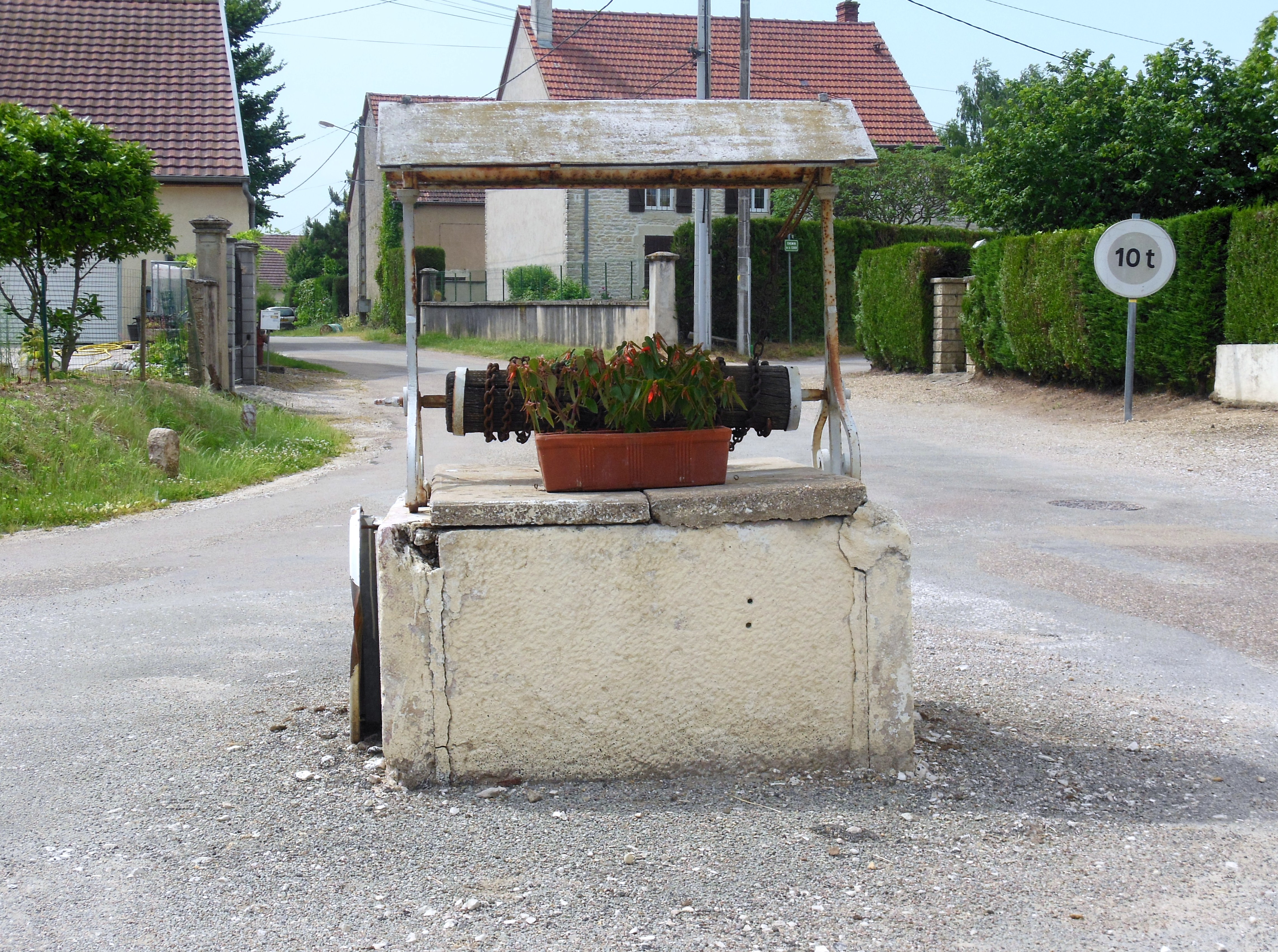
Well 2, Rue du Centre

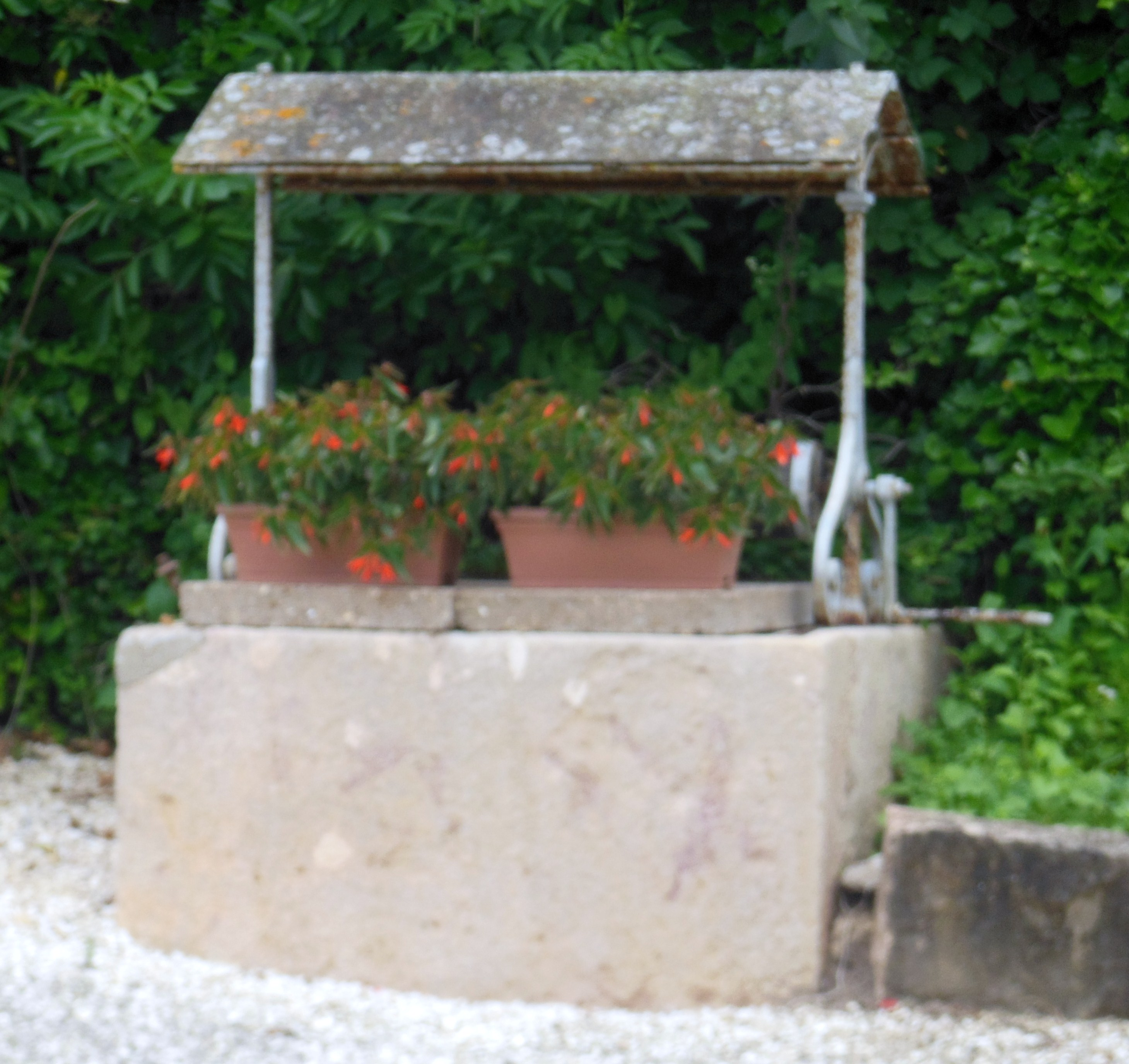
Well 2, Rue du Centre

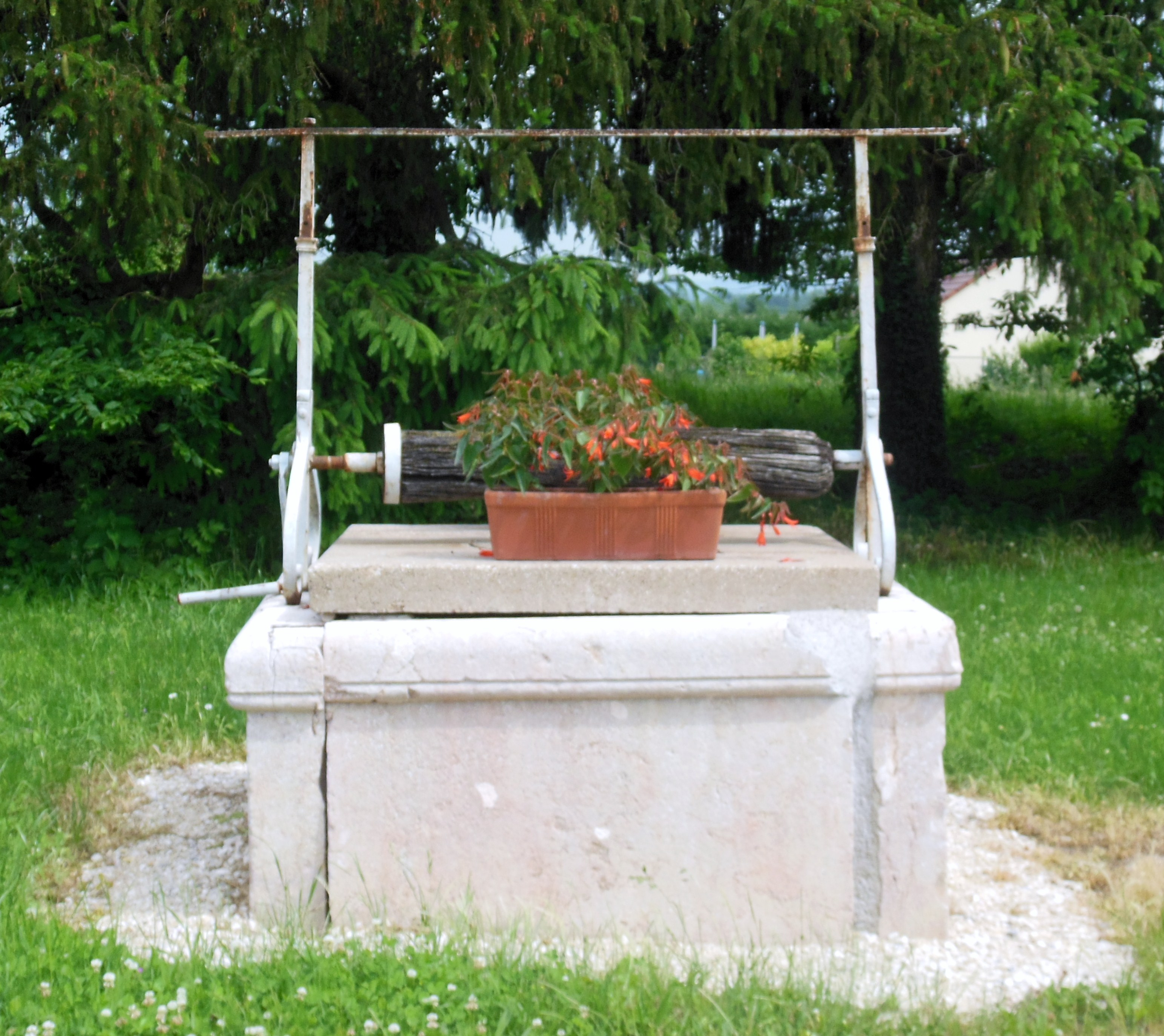
Well 2, Rue du Centre

== Notable people linked to the commune ==
- Bernard Laverne, President of the Parliament of Dijon, Co-lord of Athée (16th century)
- King Louis XIV, King of France, Maria Theresa of Spain, Queen of France, and Louis, Grand Dauphin of France, stayed one night at the Château of Athée in 1674

== See also ==
- Communes of the Côte-d'Or department
