= Chalon Cathedral =

Roman Catholic church in France

Coordinates: 46°46′57″N 4°51′33″E

Chalon Cathedral Cathédrale Saint-Vincent de Chalon-sur-Saône
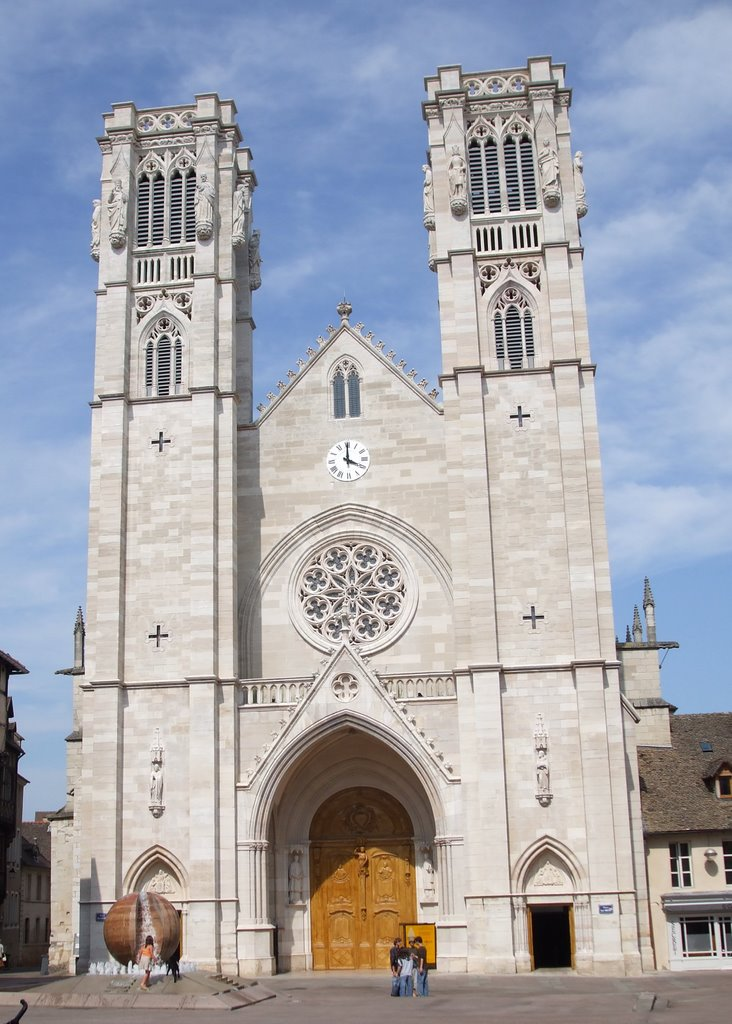
- Chalon Cathedral

Religion
- Affiliation: Roman Catholic Church
- Province: Bishop of Chalon
- Region: Saône-et-Loire
- Rite: Roman Rite
- Ecclesiastical or organisational status: Cathedral
- Status: Active

Location
- Location: Chalon-sur-Saône, France
- Interactive map of Chalon Cathedral; Cathédrale Saint-Vincent de Chalon-sur-Saône

Architecture
- Type: church
- Style: Neo-Gothic
- Groundbreaking: 8th century
- Completed: 19th century

Chalon Cathedral (French: Cathédrale Saint-Vincent de Chalon-sur-Saône) is a Roman Catholic church located in Chalon-sur-Saône. A former cathedral, it was the seat of the Bishop of Chalon. The diocese was abolished by the Concordat of 1801 and its territory absorbed by the Diocese of Autun.

Parts of the building date from the 8th century, but the Neo-Gothic façade is from the 19th. It was declared a national monument of France in 1903.

== See also ==
- List of Gothic Cathedrals in Europe
