= Eugène Genet =

French politician

Eugène Genet (20 April 1850, Chalon-sur-Saône - 21 April 1904) was a French politician belonging to the Radical Party. He was a member of the Chamber of Deputies from 1893 to 1904.
