= Robert Marchi =

French World War II fighter ace

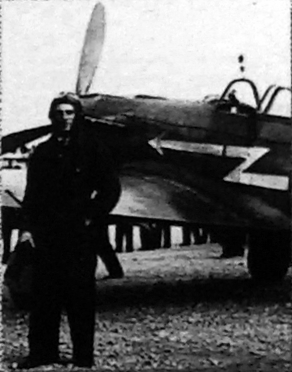
- Marchi and his Yak (04959)
- Born: 26 July 1919; Chalon-sur-Saône, France
- Died: 17 July 1946 (aged 26); Toussus-le-Noble, France
- Burial place: Changy
- Military career
- Allegiance: France
- Branch: Free French Air Force
- Service years: 1938–1945
- Rank: Lieutenant
- Unit: Normandie Group
- Known for: Aviator, flying ace
- Conflicts: World War II

Robert Marchi (26 July 1919 – 17 July 1946) was a French World War II fighter ace with thirteen confirmed victories.

== Early life ==
Robert Marchi was born on 26 July 1919 in Chalon-sur-Saône.

== World War II ==
Marchi spent the first years of the war in North Africa. While in Oran, his qualities as a pilot were quickly noticed and in 1942 he was appointed instructor at Kasba Tadla in Morocco. In October 1943, he left for East Prussia to join the Normandie-Niemen. On 7 January 1944, he arrived in Tula where he was assigned to the 1st Squadron.

Marchi shot down his first plane on 16 October 1944. He shot down three planes that day: two Junkers Ju 87 and a Focke-Wulf Fw 190. In one week, during the great offensive on Prussia, he recorded six victories. In total, the most official sources credit him with thirteen confirmed victories credited between 16 October 1944 and 12 April 1945.

Throughout his career Marchi had logged 2,230 flight hours and 107 combat missions.

== Postwar ==
On 20 June 1945, Marchi returned to civilian life where many manufacturers asked him to be a test pilot. A year later, on 17 July 1946, Marchi died during a test flight crash. He is buried in Chagny. “It is beyond certainty,” said General Pierre Pouyade, former commander of “Normandie-Niemen” during his funeral, “he would have become a great champion of aerial acrobatics... His virtuosity was incomparable."

== List of credited aerial victories ==
Plane shot down	Date	Unit	Plane flown	Location
Junkers Ju 87	16 October 1944	Normandie	Yak 9	Pilluponen
Junkers Ju 87	16 October 1944	Normandie	Yak-9	Pilluponen
Focke-Wulf Fw 190	16 October 1944	Normandie	Yak-9	Stallupoenen
Focke-Wulf Fw 190	16 October 1944	Normandie	Yak-9	Stallupoenen
Focke-Wulf Fw 190	17 October 1944	Normandie	Yak-9	Stallupoenen
Henschel Hs 129	18 October 1944	Normandie	Yak-9	Stallupoenen
Messerschmitt Bf 109	23 October 1944	Normandie	Yak-9	Stallupoenen
Focke-Wulf Fw 190	30 December 1944	Normandie	Yak-9	Trakehnen
Focke-Wulf Fw 190	30 December 1944	Normandie	Yak-9	Trakehnen
Focke-Wulf Fw 190	17 January 1945	Normandie	Yak-3	Gumbinnen
Focke-Wulf Fw 190	19 January 1945	Normandie	Yak-3	Schillen
Focke-Wulf Fw 190	9 February 1945	Normandie	Yak-3	Pillau
Focke-Wulf Fw 190	27 March 1945	Normandie	Yak-3	Pillau

== Awards ==
- Legion of Honour
- Médaille militaire
- Croix de Guerre
- Order of the Red Banner
- Order of the Patriotic War
- Medal "For the Victory over Germany in the Great Patriotic War 1941–1945"
