= Gerebald =

9th-century Catholic bishop

- Died: 885
- Feast: 12 June

Personal life
- Other names: Gerbald, Gerbaud, Gerbold, Gereboldus

Religious life
- Religion: Catholic

Senior posting
- Post: Bishop of Châlon-sur-Saône (864-885)

Gerebald was bishop of Châlon-sur-Saône from 864 to 885. He is a Catholic and Orthodox saint, with feast day 12 June.
