= Poncey-lès-Athée =

- Commune
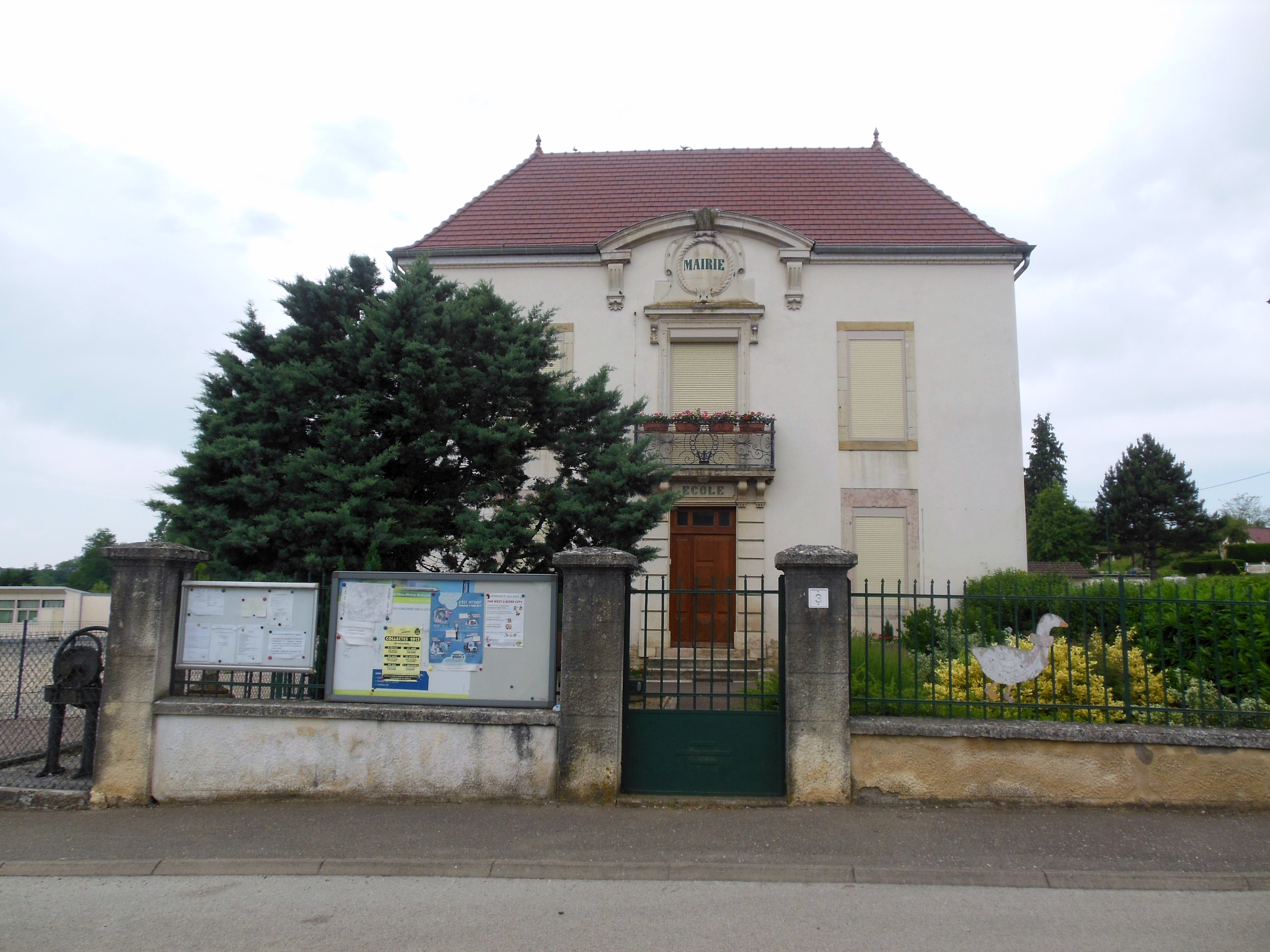
- Town hall

- Coat of arms
- Location of Poncey-lès-Athée
- Location within France Location within Bourgogne-Franche-Comté
- Coordinates: 47°14′29″N 5°23′23″E
- Country: France
- Region: Bourgogne-Franche-Comté
- Department: Côte-d'Or
- Arrondissement: Dijon
- Canton: Auxonne

Government
  - Mayor (2026–32): Eric Collin
- Area^{1}: 6.53 km^{2} (2.52 sq mi)
- Elevation: 205 m (673 ft)
- Highest elevation: 208 m (682 ft)
- Lowest elevation: 182 m (597 ft)
- Population (2023): 577
  - Density: 88.4/km^{2} (229/sq mi)
- Time zone: UTC+01:00 (CET)
  - Summer (DST): UTC+02:00 (CEST)
- INSEE/Postal code: 21493 /21130
- ^{1} French Land Register data, which excludes lakes, ponds, glaciers > 1 km^{2} (0.386 sq mi or 247 acres) and river estuaries.

Poncey-lès-Athée (French pronunciation: [pɔ̃sɛ lɛ.z‿ate], literally Poncey near Athée) is a commune in the Côte-d'Or department in eastern France.

== Population ==
Historical population
Year	Pop.	±% p.a.
1968	370	—
1975	357	−0.51%
1982	365	+0.32%
1990	380	+0.50%
1999	396	+0.46%
2007	513	+3.29%
2012	581	+2.52%
2017	581	+0.00%
2023	577	−0.12%
Source: INSEE

== See also ==
- Communes of the Côte-d'Or department
