= Hôtel de Ville, Chalon-sur-Saône =

Town hall in Chalon-sur-Saône, France

Hôtel de Ville
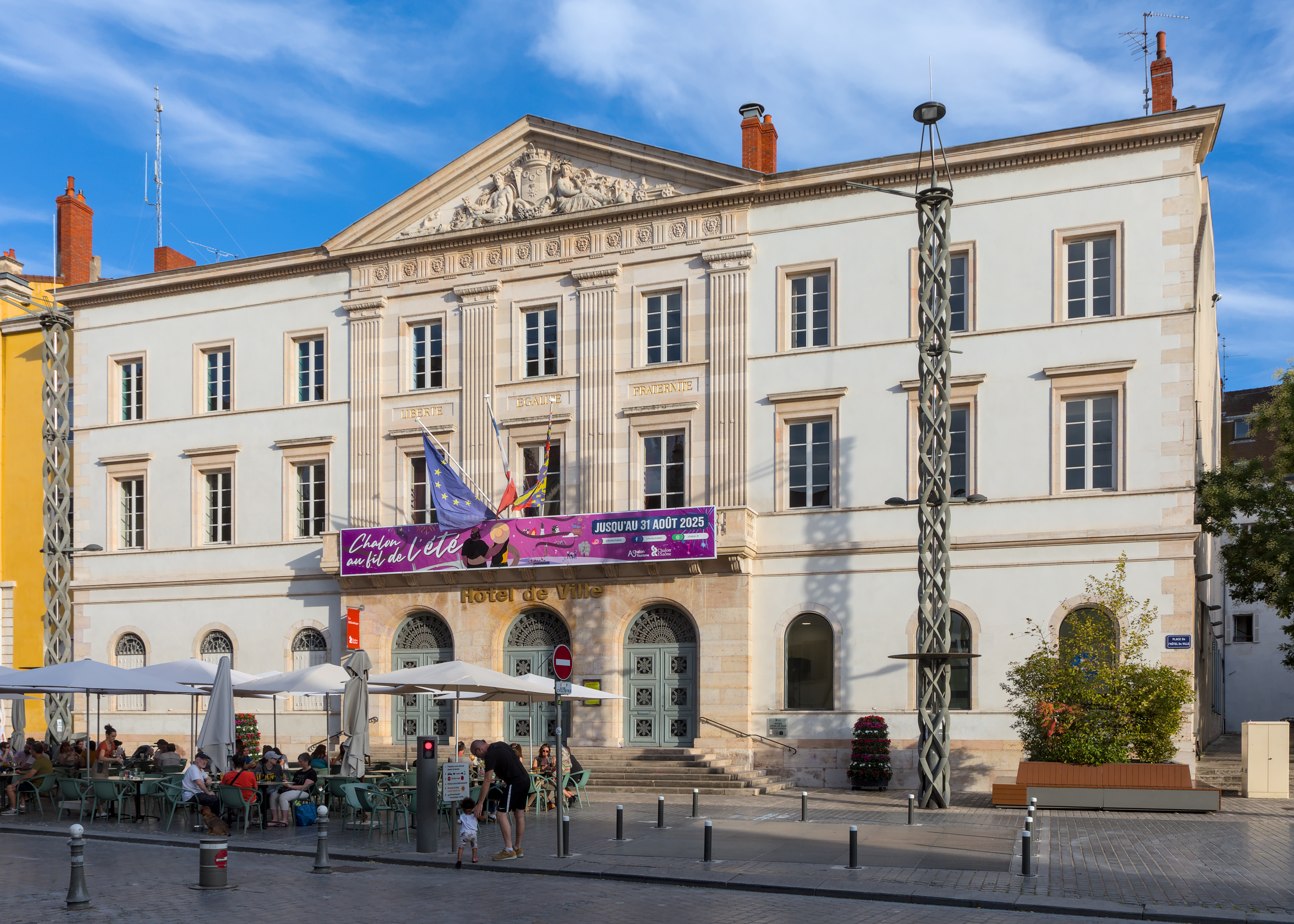
- The main frontage of the Hôtel de Ville in August 2025
- Interactive map of the Hôtel de Ville area

General information
- Type: City hall
- Architectural style: Neoclassical style
- Location: Chalon-sur-Saône, France
- Coordinates: 46.7807°N 4.8536°E
- Completed: 1845

Design and construction
- Architect: Eugène Piot

The Hôtel de Ville (French pronunciation: [otɛl də vil], City Hall) is a municipal building in Chalon-sur-Saône, Saône-et-Loire, in eastern France, standing on Place de l'Hôtel de Ville.

== History ==
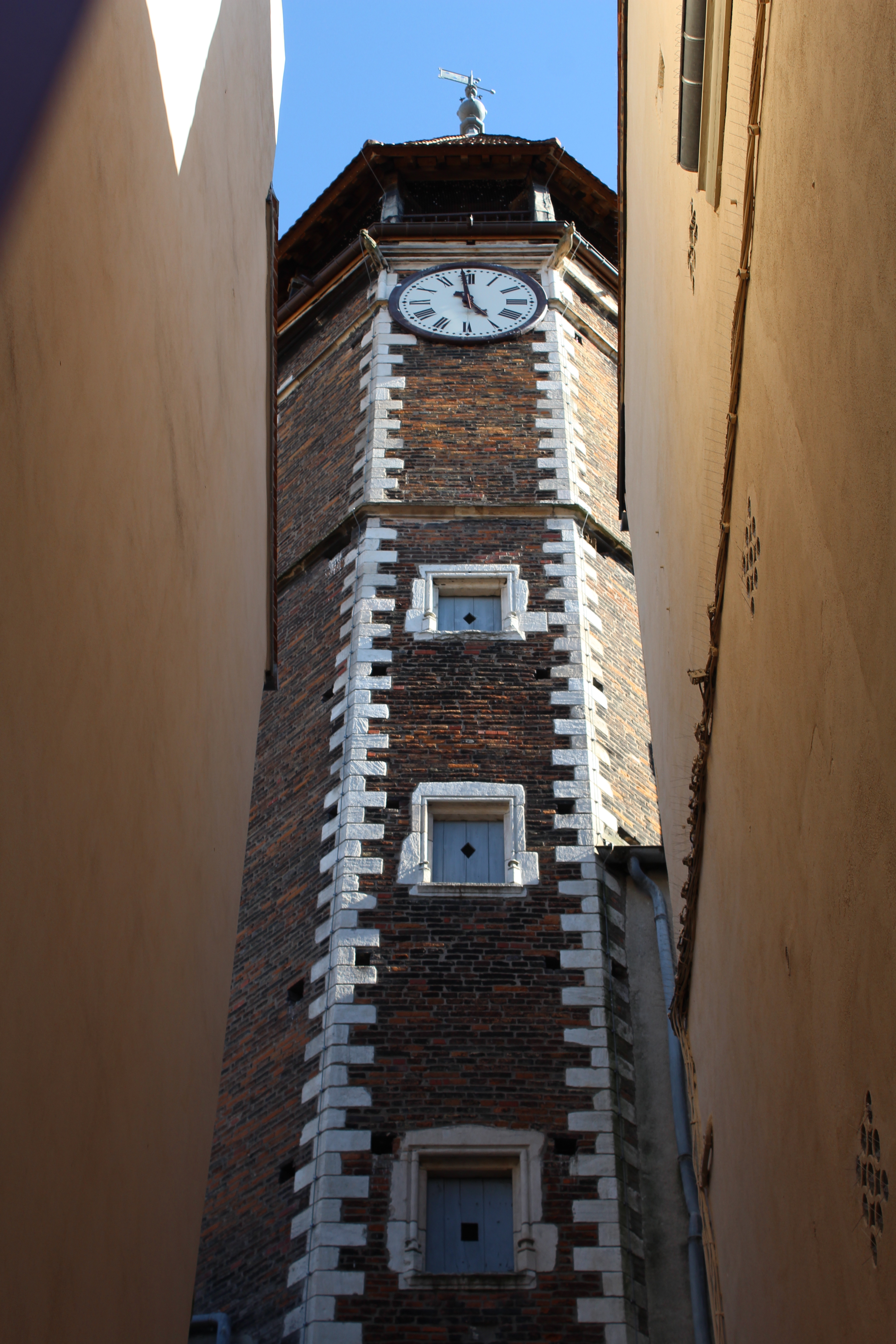
The belfry, which formed part of the first town hall

In 1402, the aldermen of Chalon-sur-Saône bought a house on the corner of Rue Saint-Georges and what is now Rue des Tonneliers for use as a meeting place. In around 1425, they expanded the house with the construction of an octagonal belfry to give it more presence. The original bell was augmented by two smaller bells in the 16th century.

In the early 19th century, the town council decided to acquire a more substantial structure for their meetings. The site they selected on Place Saint-Pierre (now Place de l'Hôtel de Ville) had been occupied by the old Couvent des Carmes (Convent of the Carmelites). The convent had been commissioned in the Middle Ages and was subsequently remodelled. During the French Revolution, the priests and nuns were driven out. The convent was then used as a military barracks until 1822, when it was acquired by the council and converted into a courthouse. The complex, which had previously consisted of a north block and a west wing, was extended with additional wings to the east and south to create a courtyard.

In the 1840s, after the original structure became dilapidated, the council decided to demolish the original buildings and erect a new town hall. Construction of the new building started in 1843. It was designed by the municipal architect, Eugène Piot, in the neoclassical style, built in ashlar stone and was completed in 1845.

The design involved a symmetrical main frontage of nine bays facing onto Place de l'Hôtel de Ville. The central section of three bays, which was slightly projected forward, featured a short flight of steps leading up to three round headed openings with voussoirs. The bays on the upper floors were flanked by Doric order pilasters supporting a frieze, which incorporated a series of masks, a modillioned cornice and a pediment with carvings in the tympanum. The building was fenestrated by round headed windows on the ground floor, casement windows with cornices on the first floor and casement windows with moulded surrounds on the second floor. Internally, the principal rooms included the Salle du Conseil (council chamber), which accommodated council meetings, and the Salon d'Honneur (ballroom), which accommodated wedding ceremonies.

On 5 September 1944, during the Second World War, after the French 1st Armoured Division, commanded by Lieutenant-General Jean Touzet du Vigier entered the town, elements of the French Resistance seized the town hall.

In 1969, the council acquired the adjacent building to the east. The site had previously accommodated an early-15th century chapel which had been used by the convent. The chapel was acquired by a metallurgist, Michel Gros, in around 1800. Gros demolished the nave of the chapel, leaving only the choir which featured a tall gothic window on the south side. He then commissioned a house which was erected on the north part of the site, where the nave had been. The acquisition of the house by the council created extra space for the town hall as well as accommodation for a public library.

Some internal remodelling took place in 1985, when the old council chamber became the Salle des Maires (a gallery displaying portraits of the mayors) and a new council chamber, with modern fixtures and fittings, was established in the old courtroom.
