= Ancient Diocese of Chalon-sur-Saône =

Roman Catholic diocese in France (?–1801)

Coordinates: 46.78°N 4.86°E

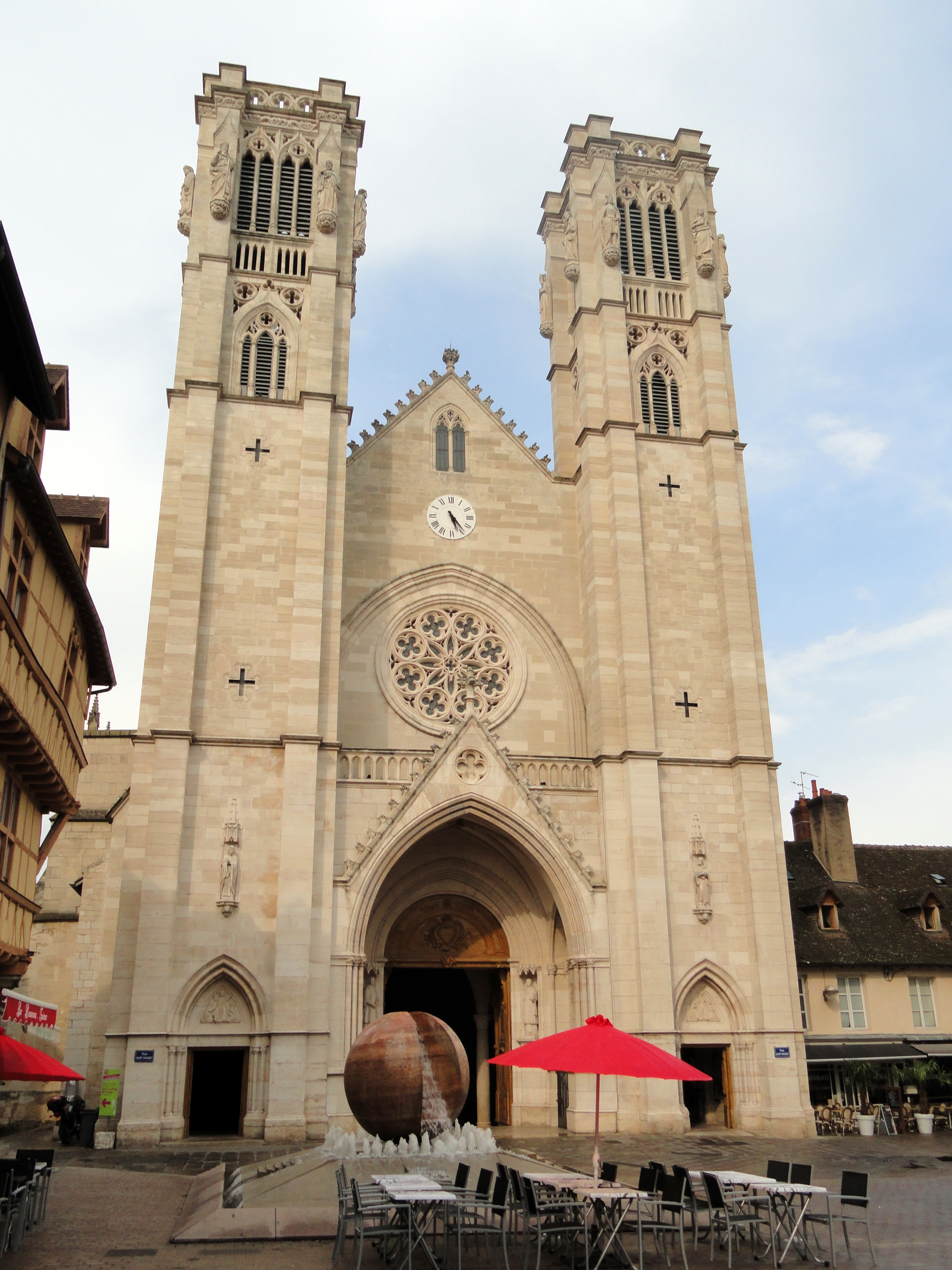
Chalon Cathedral

The former French Catholic diocese of Chalon-sur-Saône (Lat.: dioecesis Cabilonensis) existed until the French Revolution. After the Concordat of 1801, it was suppressed, and its territory went to the diocese of Autun. Its see was Chalon Cathedral.

== History ==
Julius Caesar first mentions Cabillonum in his Gallic Wars. Later it is said to be an oppidum or castrum. It was a civitas of the Burgundians. Chalon was not made a city, separate and distinct from Autun, until the fifth century, and it is probably as a consequence of this development that a bishop, Paul (I.), first appears. The first Christians in the neighborhood are said to have been a priest of Lyon named Marcellus, who was imprisoned by the Roman government along with other Christians of Lyon and their bishop, Pothinus, ca. 177 in the reign of Marcus Aurelius (161-180). The rest were executed, but Marcellus, eschewing martyrdom, managed to break out of prison and escape north along the Saône river, first to Tournus and then to Chalon. There he was taken in by a pagan, whom he converted to Christianity. Leaving Chalon, Marcellus encountered the provincial governor, who invited him to a celebration in his residence. When the governor began the celebration with an appropriate sacrifice, Marcellus excused himself on the grounds that he was a Christian; the governor ordered him to participate in the sacrifice, and Marcellus refused. This constituted refusal to obey a legitimate order, and, since prayer to the members of the Imperial Cult was involved, refusal constituted treason (laesa majestas) as well. The governor is said to have had Marcellus buried up to his waist on the bank of the Saône, where he died three days later. The method of death may be shocking, but Marcellus was a prison escapee, who refused a patriotic sacrifice, and disobeyed a Roman governor. Christians made him into a martyr.

Bishop Flavius is credited with the foundation of the monastery of S. Pierre, just north of Chalon, in 584. It was destroyed by the Arabs in the 8th century, and rebuilt by Bishop Gerboldus, ca. 887 as a Benedictine monastery. The monastery was attacked by the Huguenots in 1562 and despoiled, and the monks were driven out. King Charles IX turned the monastic buildings into a fortress in 1566 and paid the monks an annual pension in recompense.

Bishop Lupus (ca. 600), in a Life otherwise devoid of facts, is credited with founding a school for the study of the scriptures. By the time of Bishop Guillaume de Bellevesure (1294 – 1301), schools were to be found not just in Chalon, but also in towns and villages of the diocese.

=== Cathedral and other establishments ===
The original cathedral of Chalon was dedicated to Saint Étienne. In 541 King Childebert presented the cathedral with relics purported to be those of Saint Vincent of Saragossa, in whose honor the name of the cathedral was changed. That cathedral was destroyed by the Arabs in the 8th century, and rebuilt by Charlemagne. It was in that church that the Council of 813 was held. In 1310 extensive repairs were necessary, and Bishop Robert de Decize taxed every curé in the diocese the sum of its first year's income upon entry into office to pay for the works. This tax was imposed for ten years. Bishop Nicolas de Vères completed two vaults of the choir in 1386. Bishop Hugues d'Orges erected the third vault, and Bishop Jean d'Arsonval the fourth and fifth, with contributions from the Chapter and the people. The consecration took place in 1403 by Bishop Olivier de Matreuil. The cathedral was severely damaged by the Huguenots in 1562.

The cathedral was served by a Chapter, which was composed of dignities and canons. There were seven dignities at Chalon: the Dean, the Cantor, the Treasurer (who were elected by the whole Chapter), and the four Archdeacons (who were appointed by the bishop). There were once thirty canons, but the number was reduced to twenty in 1218. In 1327 the number was set at twenty-five. In 1648 there were twenty-four canons. In 1772 the number was twenty. All the cathedral chapters in France were abolished by the Constituent Assembly on 13 February 1790.

There was also a Collegiate Church in the city of Chalon, dedicated to Saint George. Saint George had originally been a parish church, under the control of the monastery of Saint Pierre. It escaped the fire which destroyed most of the town during the siege of 834, but in 1323 it became a collegiate church with twelve canons. It was served by a Chapter composed of a Dean, a Cantor, a Sacristan, and thirteen prebends. The bishop has the right to confirm the election to vacant canonries. One of the canons was assigned the task of being the priest of the parish.

The abbey of Saint Marcellus (Marcel) was founded by King Guntram of Burgundy (561–592), where he completed a church in 577, and in which he was buried. The abbey was ruined by the Arabs in the 8th century, and again in the 10th century. When the Counts of Chalon became abbots commendatory, it recovered its prestige and financial status. The counts ceded their rights to the Abbey of Cluny, when then became one of their priories. Peter Abelard spent his final months at the priory of St. Marcel, where he died on 21 April 1142. His body was interred there for a time, but secretly moved to the nunnery of the Paraclete and the care of Abbess Héloïse.

=== Church councils at Chalon ===
A council of the church was held at Chalon c. 470, under the leadership of the Metropolitan, Bishop Patiens of Lyon, to elect a successor to the deceased Paul of Chalon. In the midst of party strife, the bishops fastened on Joannes and made him bishop.

In 579 a council was summoned at Chalon by King Guntram to deal with Bishop Salonius of Embrun and Bishop Sagittarius of Gap, who had already been condemned in the second synod of Lyon on charges of adultery and homicide.

In 603 a council was held at Chalon, in which, at the instigation of Queen Brunhilda of Austrasia, Bishop Desiderius of Vienne was deposed and exiled.

Around the year 650 thirty-eight bishops met in council at Chalon, among whom was Bishop Gratus of Chalon. The council produced some twenty decisions (canons). Bishops Agapius of Digne and Bobo of Valence were degraded from the episcopal order for disregarding church canons. In 674 Bishop Desideratus (Diddo) of Chalon and the deposed bishop Bobo of Valence attacked Autun and seized Bishop Leger, their enemy, who had led a revolt of the Burgundian nobility against Ebroin, Mayor of the Palace of Neustria. They blinded him on orders of Ebroin, and held him in a monastery for two years, at which point they cut off his ears and cut out his tongue; after two more years, they killed him.

In 732 Chalon was captured and held by the Arabs of Spain, led by Abdul Rahman Al Ghafiqi, Governor-General of al-Andalus, until after their defeat by Charles Martel at the Battle of Tours.

A provincial council of Tertia Lugdunensis was held at Chalon in 813. It produced sixty-six canons. Among the most important was the requirement of the establishment of a school in each cathedral, in which reading and writing and the scriptures would be taught.

In 875 an assembly of bishops, led by Archbishop Remigius of Lyon, took place at Chalon at the church of S. Marcellus for the consecration of Adalgerius as Bishop of Autun. They then met and confirmed the properties belonging to the monastery of Tournus. Gerboldus Bishop of Chalon was present.

In 887 nine archbishops and bishops, Bishop Stephen of Chalon among them, met at the church of Saint Marcellus outside the walls of Chalon, to deal with property issues of churches and villas involving the bishop of Langres.

In 894 three bishops, headed by Bishop Gualo of Autun and including Ardradus of Chalon, met at the church of S. John the Baptist outside the walls of Chalon, to settle the case of the monk and Deacon Gerfredus of Autun, who had been accused of poisoning Bishop Adalgarus of Autun. Gerfredus was able to demonstrate his innocence by taking an oath and receiving holy communion, and was purged of the charge by all of the bishops.

On 31 October 915 seven bishops met under the presidency of Austerius, Archbishop of Lyon, at the church of S. Marcellus outside the walls of Chalon to deal with the case of Roculsus, Count of Mâcon, who was threatened with excommunication for his refusal to respect various properties belonging to the church. They also dealt with a dispute between two priests over a parish church which was being usurped. Bishop Ardradus participated.

A council was held at Chalon by the papal Apocrisiarius Aldebrannus (Hildebrand) in 1065, to adjudge the ownership of the church of Spinola. The Bishop of Chalon Guido (Wido) was present.

A council was held at Chalon by Cardinal Peter Damiani, the Papal Legate, and thirteen bishops in 1063 in the reign of Pope Alexander II. Bishop Drogo of Mâcon had violated the privileges of the monastery of Cluny, and Abbot Hugh had gone to Rome and complained. The council found in favor of Cluny, and Bishop Drogo was compelled to beg pardon.

In 1115 a council was held at Tournus in the diocese of Chalon, presided over by Archbishop Guy of Vienne, the Papal Legate, at which Bishop Gualterius was present. The issue was a conflict between the two Collegiate Churches of Besançon, Saint John and Saint Stephen. Pope Paschal II had previously committed the case to Archbishop Guillaume of Besançon, who was unable to bring the two parties to agreement.

=== Black death ===
In July 1348 the bubonic plague reached Chalon. The mortality rate, at least in some sections of the diocese, is recorded at fifteen times the normal death rate.

=== Religious orders ===
Bishop Cyrus de Thiard de Bissy was particularly favorable to the religious orders. He brought the Franciscans to Chalon in 1598, the Capuchins in 1604, the Carmelites in 1610, and the Dominicans in 1621. Efforts to bring the Jesuits to Chalon also began in the time of Bishop Cyrus, but the impetus came from the town council, which was eager to upgrade the quality of the Collège de Chalon. In 1608 the project was discussed, but the stumbling block was financial. The establishment of a Jesuit college in Autun kindled local patriotism, led by the Sieur de Pontoux who was serving as Mayor, and a committee of lawyers was appointed to try to obtain a royal brevet, which, succeeded, but this second project also failed for financial reasons. In 1618 yet another attempt was made under a new mayor, Sieur Mathieu, who convinced the town council to begin by consulting the Jesuit Provincial in Dijon, Fr. Ignace Armand. The Provincial sent an agent to Chalon to preach a series of sermons, and also to investigate the situation. Their conclusion was that the revenues were inadequate. Then, in 1618, it was learned that the Baron de Huxelles was willing to resign his benefice of the Priory of Saint-Marcel, and the town officials considered whether it could be handed over to the Jesuits. But the Baron's brother intervened, and one of the town councilors was opposed, and the project failed. In 1626 the Marquis de Huxelles inspired the convocation of a general assembly of the burghers and citizens of Chalon to provide the needed funds, but an opposition party proposed the introduction of the Oratorians instead, and nothing was accomplished. It was even questioned whether the assembly was legitimate. When the Prince de Condé obtained the government of Burgundy, he visited Chalon in December 1632, and ordered the Mayor to convoke an assembly, which he would attend personally. The opposition party, however, was able to speak to the Prince during a banquet given by Bishop de Neuchèze, which seriously upset the Prince, who left Chalon immediately. In June 1634, a new set of town officials was able to convince the Jesuit Provincial in Dijon, Fr. Filleau, as well as the Prince, that the arrangements were all in order, and on 26 June 1634 the contracts were finalized and the Jesuits placed in possession of the Collège de Chalon. They maintained the college until their expulsion from France in 1762. In 1784 King Louis XVI handed over the Collège de Chalon to the priests of the Congrégation-Saint-Joseph. In February 1791, the oath of allegiance to the Civil Constitution of the Clergy was demanded, and the priests of the Collège de Chalon refused to take the oath, bringing about their dismissal. Agents of the municipality took their place.

In April 1635 Bishop de Neuchèze entertained in the episcopal palace for six days Zaga Christos, the (purported) twenty-two-year-old son of the Emperor of Ethiopia, who was on his way to the French Court.

In 1635 a pestilence struck Chalon and all of Provence. The house of the Franciscans in Chalon was very severely hit, and they were helped by a Capuchin, Fr. Mathias de Beaune, who had been sent after an appeal from the magistrates of Chalon. The unhappiness of the population was increased by the end of the siege of Dôle, which let loose on the countryside numbers of marauders who burned villages and robbed everyone and everything. In the same year the government demanded the registration of all adherents of the Protestant religion, and with the agreement of the Prince of Condé and Bishop de Neuchèze this was begun. Feeling ran so high in Chalon that the 'temple' of the Huguenots was burned to the ground.

=== The end ===
In 1790 the Civil Constitution of the Clergy abolished (suppressed) more than fifty 'redundant' dioceses in France, as part of an effort to align the ecclesiastical dioceses in France with new political divisions called 'departements'. Chalon-sur-Saône became part of the 'Departement de Saône-et-Loire', with its headquarters at Autun, and was part of the 'Metropole du Sud-Est' with its headquarters at Lyon. On 15 February 1791 the 'electors' of Saône-et-Loire chose Jean-Louis Gouttes as their 'Constitutional Bishop'. He was executed during the Reign of Terror on 26 March 1794, shortly after Religion had been abolished in France and replaced by Reason.

On 29 November 1801, Pope Pius VII reestablished the dioceses of France, but Chalon was not one of them. Chalon remained part of the diocese of Autun, with Lyon as its Metropolitan. In 1853, the Bishop of Autun was granted the title of Bishop of Autun-Châlon-sur-Saône-Mâcon, in memory of the suppressed dioceses, and on 8 December 2002, as part of a general reorganization of the ecclesiastical map of France, Pope John Paul II created a new archdiocese at Dijon, and made the diocese of Autun-Châlon-sur-Saône-Mâcon-Cluny its suffragan.

== Bishops ==
=== To 1000 ===
[Donatien c. 346]

- Paul (I.) L'Ancien (c. 460s)
- Paul II. L'Jeune (dead before c.470)
- Iohannes (I.)
- ? Tranquillus c. 484
- Sylvester (c. 486–526)
- Desiderius (Didier) (c. 530 or 531)
- Agricola (c. 532–580)
- Flavius (580–c. 595)
- Lupus (c. 601–602)
- Wandelin 603
- Antestis (attested 614)
- Gebderinus (641)
- Gratus (attested c. 650)
- Desideratus (Diddo) (666)
- ? Amblacus
- Hucbertus (attested 779)
- Fova (Faof) (c. 813–c. 838)

[Milon]

- Godescalc c. 853–c. 860
- Gerboldus (Gerebald) (c. 864–c. 885)
- Warnulf ? 885
- Stephanus (886–889)
- Ardradus (889–c. 925)
- ? Axoranus
- ? Stacteus
- Durandus (I.)
- Hildebodus (attested 948, 949, 954)
- Frotgairius 961
- Radulfus (Raoul) 977–986

=== 1000 to 1300 ===
- Lambert 1017
- Gottfried I. 1017–1040
- Hugo I. 1040
- Guido (Guy I.) 1044–c. 1058
- Achardus (Aicard) c. 1058–1072
- Roclinus (Rodericus) (1072–c. 1078)
- Walter (I.) (1080–1121)
- Gothaud (Jotsald) (1121–1126)
- Gautier de Sercy c. 1128–c. 1156
- Peter (I.) c. 1158–c. 1173
- Engilbert c. 1175–1183
- Robert (I.) 1185–1215
- Durand (II.) (1215?–1231)
- Guillaume de La Tour (1231 – 25 March 1245)
- Alexandre de Bourgogne-Montaigu (1245–1261)
- Thibaud (1261–1264)
- Guy de Sennecey (1264 – 12 October 1269)
- Ponce de Sissey (1269 – 14 September 1273)
- Guillaume du Blé (1273 – September 1294)
- Guillaume de Bellevesure (1294 – 1301)

=== 1300 to 1500 ===
- Robert de Decize (25 May 1302 – September 1315)
- Berthaud de La Chapelle de Villiers (1315–1333)
- Hugues de Corrabeuf (15 March 1333 – 30 April 1342)
- Pierre de Chalon (26 June 1342 – 6 November 1345)
- Jean Aubryot (21 March 1346 – 1351)
- Renaud (3 January 1352 – 2 October 1353)
- Jean de Mello (2 October 1353 – 8 February 1357)
- Joannes Germain (8 February 1357 – 18 June 1361)
- Jean de Saint-Just (18 June 1361 – 1369?)

Jean de Salornay

- Geoffroy de Saligny (18 June 1369 – 13 April 1374)
- Nicolas de Vères (12 May 1374 – 8 November 1386)

Guillaume de Saligny (1386–1387)

- Olivier de Martreuil (29 January 1387 – 1405) (Avignon Obedience)
- Jean de La Coste (6 April 1405 – 10 March 1408) (Avignon Obedience)
- Philibert de Saulx (10 March 1408 – 14 April 1413) (Avignon Obedience)
- Jean d'Arsonval (14 April 1413 – 27 August 1416)
- Hugues d'Orges (3 September 1416/16 January 1417 – 19 January 1431)
- Jean Rolin (26 January 1431 – 20 August 1436)
- Jehan Germain (20 August 1436 – 2 February 1461)
- Jean de Poupet (27 May 1461 – 14 July 1480)
- André de Poupet (14 July 1480 – 11 December 1503)

=== From 1500 ===
- Jean de Poupet de La Chaux, O.S.B. (11 December 1503 – 28 December 1531)
- Antoine de Vienne (23 February 1532 – February 1552)
- Louis Guillart (16 October 1553 – 4 September 1560)
- Antoine Herlaut (14 April 1561 – 28 September 1573)
- Jacques Fourré, O.P. (16 November 1573 – 20 January 1578)
- Pontus de Thiard de Bissy (17 March 1578 – 1594)
- Cyrus de Thiard de Bissy (24 January 1594 – 3 January 1624)
- Jacques de Neuchèze (7 October 1624 – 1 May 1658)
- Jean de Meaupeou (21 April 1659 – 2 May 1677)
- Henri-Félix de Tassy (31 January 1678 – 11 November 1711)
- François Madot (16 March 1712 – 7 October 1753)
- Louis-Henri de Rochefort D'Ailly (1 April 1754 – 13 June 1772)
- Joseph-François D'Andignè de La Chasse (7 September 1772 – 7 December 1781)
- Jean-Baptiste du Chilleau (1781 – 15 November 1815)

== See also ==
- Patrimoine-histoire, Chalon-sur-Saône, cathédrale Saint Vincent, retrieved: 2017-05-24.(in French)
- Catholic Church in France
- List of Catholic dioceses in France
- Vivre à Chalon.com, "Chalon : Pratiques funéraires dans la cathédrale Saint-Vincent", retrieved: 2017-05-24.(in French)

== Bibliography ==
=== Reference works ===
- Gams, Pius Bonifatius (1873). Series episcoporum Ecclesiae catholicae: quotquot innotuerunt a beato Petro apostolo. Ratisbon: Typis et Sumptibus Georgii Josephi Manz. (Use with caution; obsolete)
- Eubel, Conradus, ed. (1913). Hierarchia catholica, Tomus 1 (second ed.). Münster: Libreria Regensbergiana. (in Latin)
- Eubel, Conradus, ed. (1914). Hierarchia catholica, Tomus 2 (second ed.). Münster: Libreria Regensbergiana. (in Latin)
- Gulik, Guilelmus (1923). Eubel, Conradus (ed.). Hierarchia catholica, Tomus 3 (second ed.). Münster: Libreria Regensbergiana.
- Gauchat, Patritius (Patrice) (1935). Hierarchia catholica IV (1592-1667). Münster: Libraria Regensbergiana.
- Ritzler, Remigius; Sefrin, Pirminus (1952). Hierarchia catholica medii et recentis aevi V (1667-1730). Patavii: Messagero di S. Antonio.
- Ritzler, Remigius; Sefrin, Pirminus (1958). Hierarchia catholica medii et recentis aevi VI (1730-1799). Patavii: Messagero di S. Antonio.

=== Studies ===
- Batault, Henri (1872). "Essai historique sur les écoles de Chalon-sur-Saône du XVe à la fin du XVIIIe siècle", in: Mémoires de la Société d'Histoire et d'Archéologie de Chalon-sur-Saône (Chalon-sur-Saône), 6 (1872), pp. 5–68; 79–98. [Jesuits at Chalon]
- Bauzon, Louis Marie François. Recherches historiques sur la persécution religieuse dans le département de Saone-et-Loire Tome I (1889), Tome II, Tome III (1901), Tome IV (1903). Chalon-sur-Saône: L. Marceau. (in French)
- Besnard, Pierre. "Les origines et les premiers siècles de l'Église châlonnaise", in: Revue d'histoire de l'Église de France 5 n°28, 1914. pp. 449–477. (in French)
- Courtépée, Claude (1848). Description générale et particulière du Duché de Bourgogne, précédée de l'abrégé historique de cette province (in French). Vol. Tome troisieme (III) (2. ed.). Dijon: Lagier.
- Duchesne, Louis (1910). Fastes épiscopaux de l'ancienne Gaule: II. L'Aquitaine et les Lyonnaises. Paris: Fontemoing.
- Du Tems, Hugues (1775). Le clergé de France, ou tableau historique et chronologique des archevêques, évêques, abbés, abbesses et chefs des chapitres principaux du royaume (in French). Vol. Tome quatrieme (4). Paris: Brunet. pp. 571–619.
- Jean, Armand (1891). Les évêques et les archevêques de France depuis 1682 jusqu'à 1801 (in French). Paris: A. Picard.
- Juenin, Pierre (1733). Nouvelle Histoire de l'abbaïe royale et collegiale de Saint Filibert, et de la ville de Tournus (in French). Dijon: Antoine de Fay.
- Longnon, Auguste, ed. (1904). Pouillés de la Province de Lyon. Recueils des historiens de la France: Pouillés, Tome I (in French and Latin). Paris: Imprimerie nationale. pp. 173–188.
- Madignier, Jacques (1996). Diocèse de Chalon-sur-Saône. Fasti ecclesiae Gallicanae: répertoire prosopographique des évêques, dignitaires et chanoines de France de 1200 à 1500, Vol. 15 (in French). Turnhout: Brepols. ISBN 978-2-503-56707-5.
- Perry, Claude (1659). Histoire civile et ecclésiastique, ancienne et moderne de la ville et cité de Chalon-sur-Saône... composée par le P. Claude Perry (in French). Chalon-sur-Saone: Philippe Tan.
