= Charles Chamberland =

French microbiologist (1851–1908)

Charles Edouard Chamberland
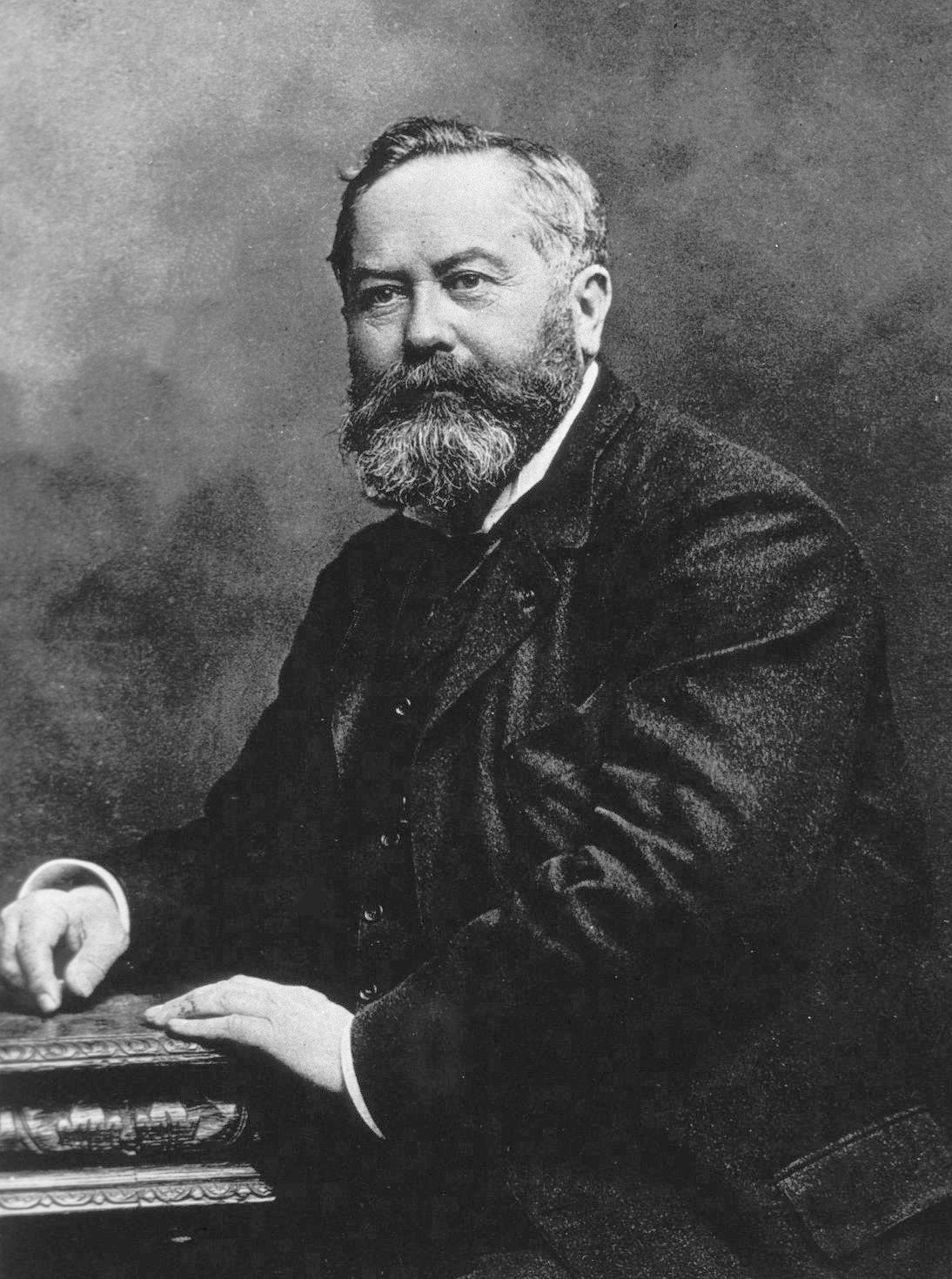
- Born: 12 March 1851; Chilly-le-Vignoble
- Died: 2 May 1908 (aged 57)
- Known for: Chamberland filter
- Scientific career
- Fields: microbiology

Charles Edouard Chamberland (French pronunciation: [ʃaʁl ʃɑ̃bɛʁlɑ̃]; 12 March 1851 – 2 May 1908) was a French microbiologist from Chilly-le-Vignoble in the department of Jura who worked with Louis Pasteur. Chamberland was present at Pouilly-le-Fort when the efficacy of the anthrax vaccine, which he had made with Emile Roux, was validated. Following this success, Chamberland was put in charge of mass-producing the anthrax vaccine.

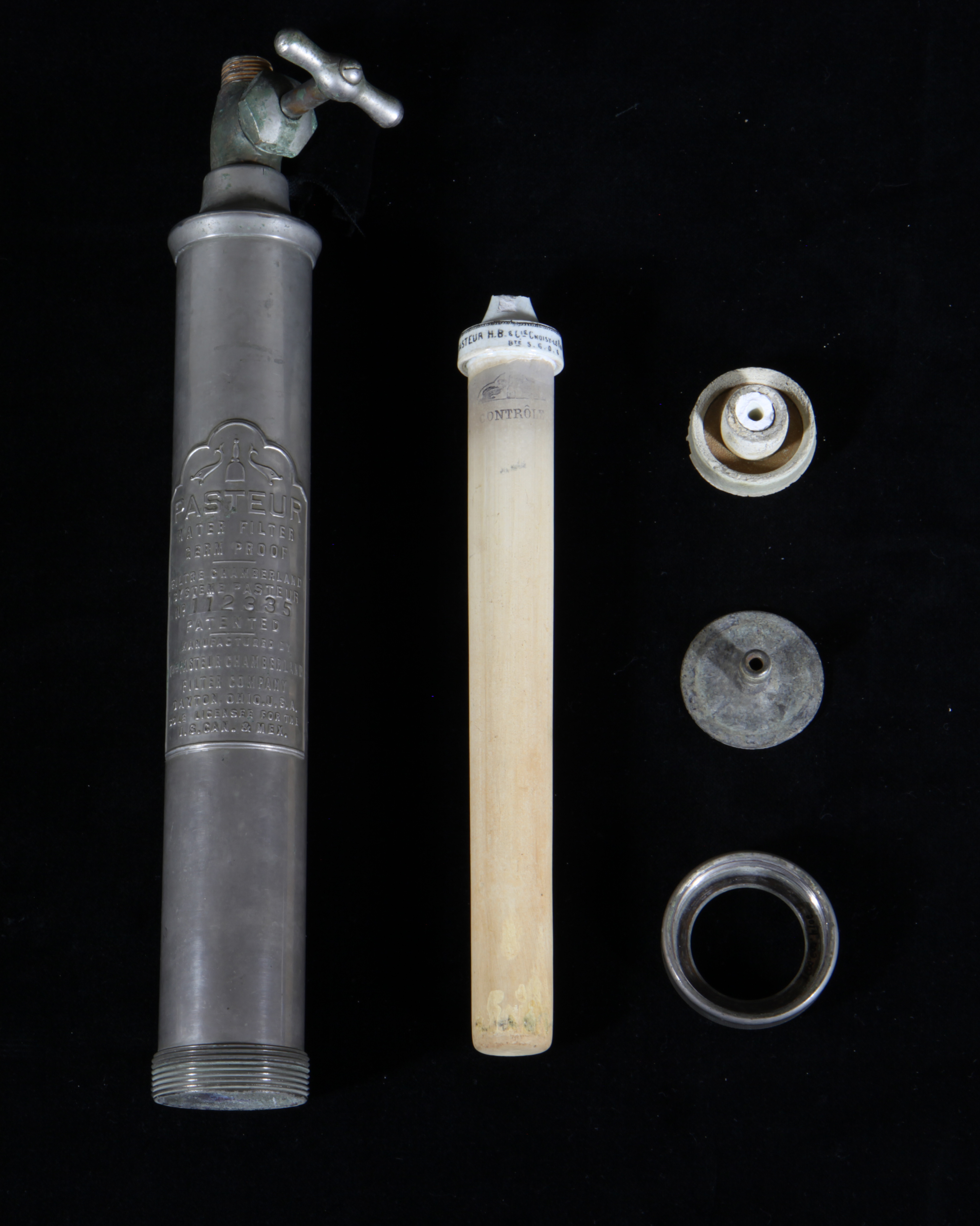
Components of a Pasteur-Chamberland filter

In 1884 he developed a type of filtration known today as the Chamberland filter or Chamberland-Pasteur filter, a device that made use of an unglazed porcelain bar. The filter had pores that were smaller than bacteria, thus making it possible to pass a solution containing bacteria through the filter, and having the bacteria completely removed from the solution. Chamberland was also credited for starting a research project that led to the invention of the autoclave device in 1879.

== Biography ==
He completed his secondary education at the Lycée Rouget-de-Lisle in Lons-le-Saunier, before entering the Collège-lycée Jacques-Decour in Paris to study special mathematics.

In 1871, he was admitted to the entrance examinations for the École polytechnique and the École normale supérieure. In the end, he opted for the École normale.

In 1874, he passed the agrégation in physics and taught for a year at the Lycée de Nîmes.

In 1875, he joined Louis Pasteur laboratory at the École normale supérieure as an agrégé préparateur. At Pasteur's request, he took over an experiment carried out by Ch. Bastian, a proponent of the theory of spontaneous generation, and demonstrated that the London doctor's conclusions were erroneous.

In April 1878, Louis Pasteur associated his name with a publication on "The theory of germs and its applications to medicine and surgery", in which it was stated that every infectious disease is caused by a germ, and that each infectious disease corresponds to a particular germ.

In August 1878, he took part, along with Émile Roux and A. Vinsot, in Louis Pasteur's campaign to study how herds were infected by anthrax bacteria. Vinsot, in Louis Pasteur's campaign to study how herds become infected with the Bacillus anthracis near Chartres. Observations revealed that sheep contract the disease through lesions in the digestive tract, and that anthrax spores are carried by earthworms.

Between 1878 and 1880, he was commissioned to study an Anthrax epidemic in Savagna, near Lons-Le-Saunier. He studied the etiology of the disease's development and a treatment developed by a veterinarian from Lons-Le-Saunier, M. Louvrier. His experiments did not lead to any conclusions as to the efficacy of the treatment, but they did reveal the existence of a refractory state in animals cured of a first attack or a previous inoculation. From that point, his research focused on creating this refractory state by inoculating a benign form of the disease, which is the origin of vaccines.

In 1879, he defended his doctoral thesis in the physical sciences, entitled "Recherches sur l'origine et le développement des organismes microscopiques" ("Research into the origin and development of microscopic organisms"). This was the starting point for his work on the sterilization of culture media, which led him to design a disinfection oven that bears his name: the Autoclave.

Between 1879 and 1888, he was assistant director of Louis Pasteur laboratory on rue d'Ulm.

In 1880, he took part in experiments to verify the anthrax vaccine of Jean Joseph Henri Toussaint, professor at the Toulouse Veterinary School. Toussaint achieved attenuation of the vaccine using the antiseptic phenic acid (phenol). He had publication priority for the use of an antiseptic for this purpose.

In April 1881, two days before the signing of the Pouilly-le-Fort experimental protocol (a public anthrax vaccination experiment on sheep), Charles Chamberland and Louis Pasteur carried out a comparative experiment between Louis Pasteur's oxygen-attenuated vaccine and a vaccine attenuated by the antiseptic Potassium dichromate. Chamberland and Louis Pasteur found that the second vaccine was the most effective. Pasteur decided to use the vaccine attenuated by potassium dichromate in experiments on sheep at Pouilly-le-Fort. It was a success, but Pasteur, in his publications on the Pouilly-le-Fort experiments, did not mention potassium dichromate and suggested that the success was due to the oxygen-attenuated vaccine (see the article Secret de Pouilly-le-Fort).

In 1881, together with Louis Pasteur,Émile Roux and L. Thuillier, he undertook the study of Rabies.

In 1884, he developed a filter, based on a porous porcelain candle of his own invention, to remove microbes from drinking water. The instrument became known as the Chamberland filter. The filter was used to combat the spread of Typhoid fever, which was present in Paris at the time, and as a new research instrument, leading to the discovery of diphtheria and tetanus toxins.

In 1885, he was elected deputy on the Jura (department) Radical Republicans list. He was one of the authors of the first bill on public hygiene.

From 1886 to 1888, he helped design and organize the Pasteur Institute.

In 1887, he was elected town councillor and then mayor of Chilly-le-Vignoble, and was sent by Louis Pasteur to the Congress of Vienna, where he confronted Robert Koch, who questioned the efficacy of anthrax vaccination.

In 1888, he was appointed head of department at the Pasteur Institute (a position he held until 1904). He was responsible for the Microbial Hygiene Department and the Vaccine Department. In 1900, he opened a small wooden box factory in Frébuans, near Chilly-le-Vignoble, to ship vaccines around the world.

He died on May 2, 1908, at his home in the 15th arrondissement of Paris. He is buried in his native village.
