= Courbouzon =

Courbouzon may refer to:

- Courbouzon, Jura a commune in the French region of Franche-Comté
- Courbouzon, Loir-et-Cher, a commune in the French region of Centre
