= Berkefeld filter =

Water filter made of diatomaceous earth (Kieselgur)

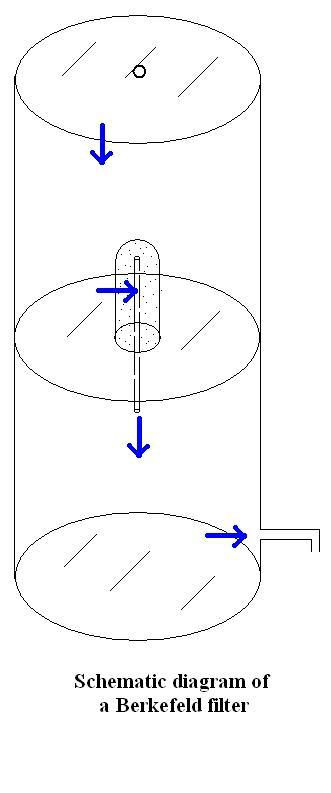
Schematic diagram of a Berkefeld filter

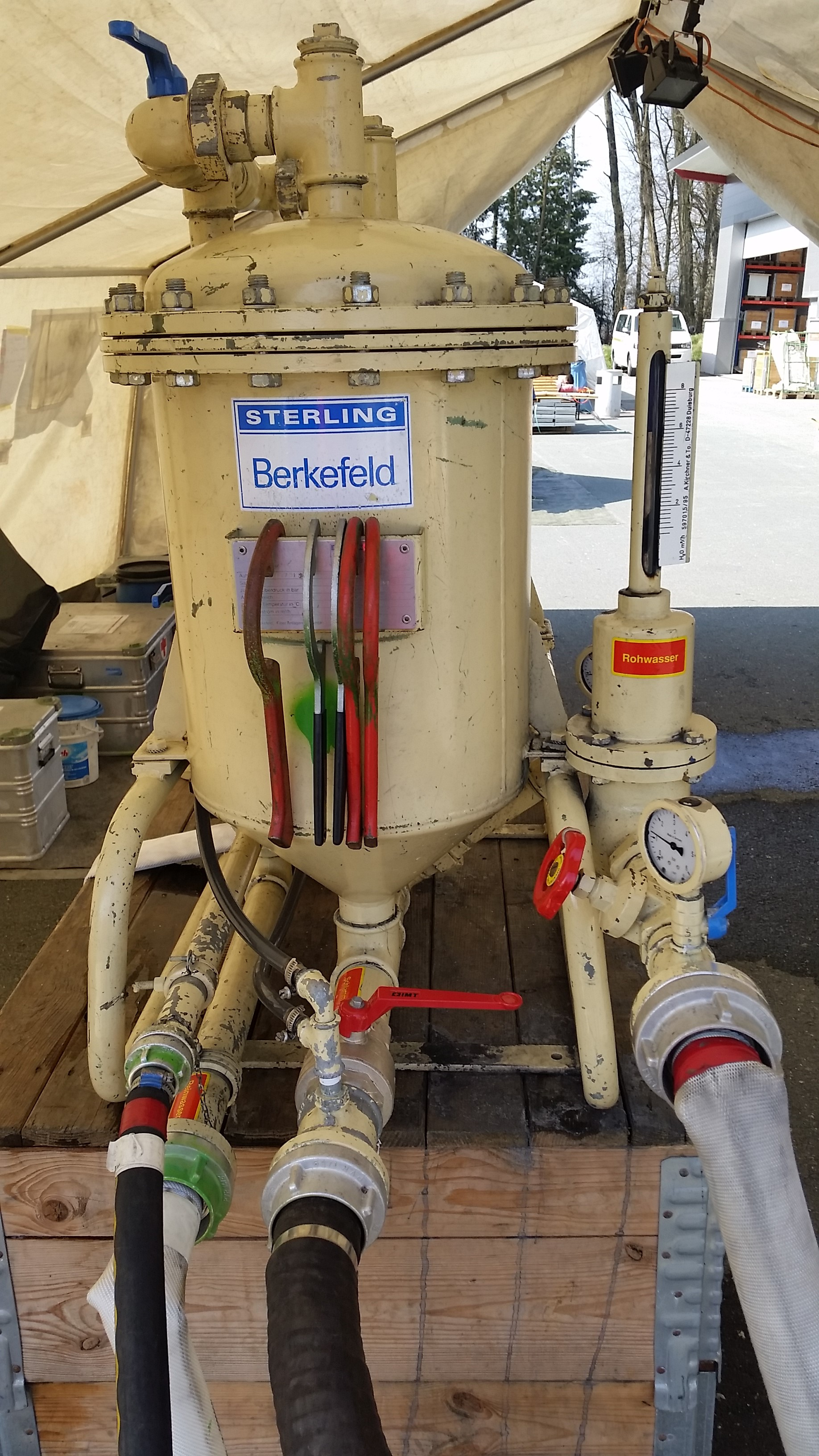
Berkefeld field filter

A Berkefeld filter is a water filter made of diatomaceous earth (Kieselgur). It was invented in Germany in 1891, and by 1922 was being marketed in the United Kingdom by the Berkefeld Filter Co. Berkefeld was the name of the owner of the mine in Hanover, Germany, where the material was obtained.

The Berkefeld is a good bacterial water filter used in microbiological laboratories, in homes and out in the field.

== Design ==
The filter housing consists of two cylinders sitting one on top of the other. The upper one has a lid and can be filled with impure water. In the bottom of the upper cylinder are one or more holes fitted with diatomaceous earth (Kieselgur) filter columns (filter candles). The water is forced through the filters by gravity, and then trickles down to the lower cylinder where it is stored and tapped off as required.

Some types of filters are fitted with a carbon core to act as a deodorizing adsorbent. They may also be impregnated with silver to inhibit bacterial growth. Some types, depending on their grade of porosity, also remove certain microscopic fungi and particulate matter. The filters without silver impregnation are sterilized by autoclaving or by steam sterilizer after a thorough cleaning.

== Types ==
The filters are classified according to the diameter of the pores in the earth:

- V (Viel) - Coarsest pores
- N (Normal) - Intermediate sized pores
- W (Wenig) - Finest pores

== Usefulness ==
The Berkefeld is a cheap, portable and efficient bacterial filter in general, though it does not remove viruses like Hepatitis A and some bacteria such as mycoplasma. Some of the first Berkefeld filters were used during the 1892 cholera epidemic in Hamburg.

== See also ==
- Chamberland filter
