= Briod =

Commune in Bourgogne-Franche-Comté, France

- Commune
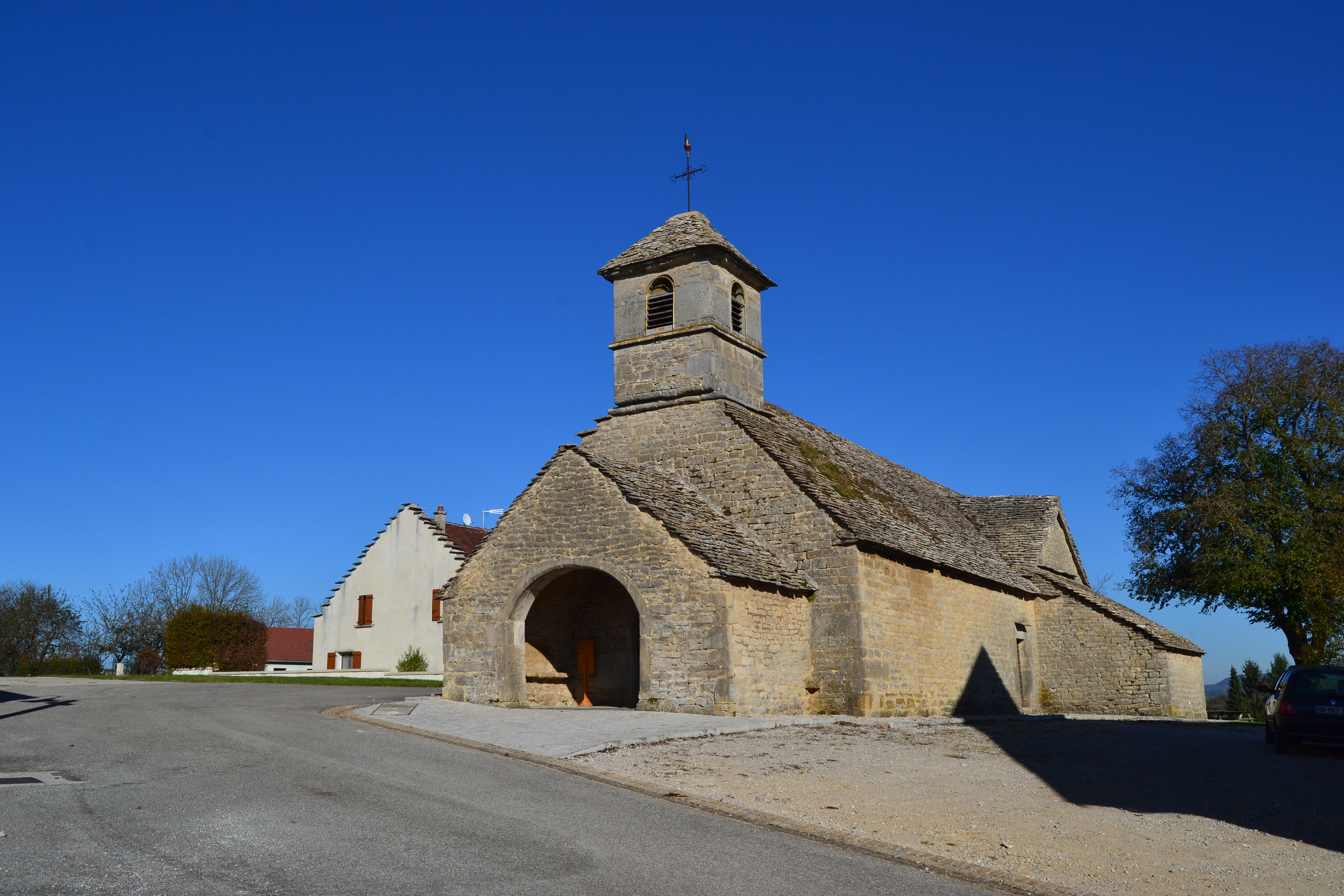
- The church of Saint-Jérôme in Briod
- Location of Briod
- Location within France Location within Bourgogne-Franche-Comté
- Coordinates: 46°39′40″N 5°37′28″E
- Country: France
- Region: Bourgogne-Franche-Comté
- Department: Jura
- Arrondissement: Lons-le-Saunier
- Canton: Poligny
- Intercommunality: Espace Communautaire Lons Agglomération

Government
  - Mayor (2020–2026): Jean-Marie Ecoiffier
- Area^{1}: 4.04 km^{2} (1.56 sq mi)
- Highest elevation: 555 m (1,821 ft)
- Lowest elevation: 505 m (1,657 ft)
- Population (2023): 216
  - Density: 53.5/km^{2} (138/sq mi)
- Time zone: UTC+01:00 (CET)
  - Summer (DST): UTC+02:00 (CEST)
- INSEE/Postal code: 39079 /39570
- ^{1} French Land Register data, which excludes lakes, ponds, glaciers > 1 km^{2} (0.386 sq mi or 247 acres) and river estuaries.

Briod (French pronunciation: [bʁijo]) is a commune in the Jura department in Bourgogne-Franche-Comté in eastern France.

== Population ==
Historical population
Year	Pop.	±% p.a.
1968	87	—
1975	80	−1.19%
1982	141	+8.43%
1990	141	+0.00%
1999	164	+1.69%
2007	203	+2.70%
2012	211	+0.78%
2017	204	−0.67%
2023	216	+0.96%
Source: INSEE

== See also ==
- Communes of the Jura department
