= Canton of Lons-le-Saunier-2 =

Coordinates: 46.67°N 5.55°E

The canton of Lons-le-Saunier-2 is an administrative division of the Jura department, eastern France. It was created at the French canton reorganisation which came into effect in March 2015. Its seat is in Lons-le-Saunier.

It consists of the following communes:

1. Bornay
2. Chilly-le-Vignoble
3. Courbouzon
4. Frébuans
5. Geruge
6. Gevingey
7. Lons-le-Saunier (partly)
8. Macornay
9. Messia-sur-Sorne
10. Moiron
11. Trenal
12. Vernantois
