= Geruge =

Commune in Bourgogne-Franche-Comté, France

- Commune
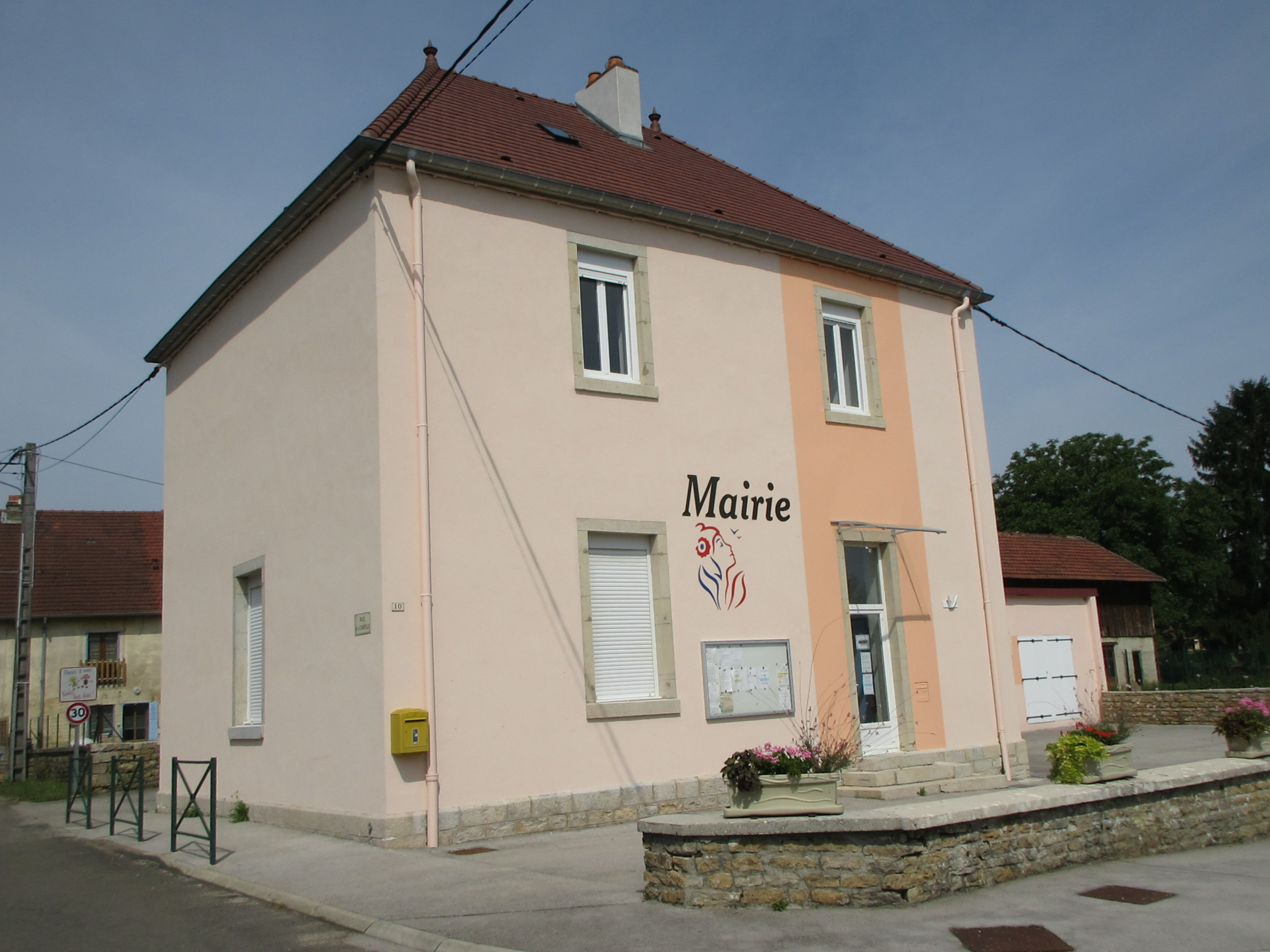
- The town hall in Geruge

- Coat of arms
- Location of Geruge
- Location within France Location within Bourgogne-Franche-Comté
- Coordinates: 46°37′41″N 5°31′48″E
- Country: France
- Region: Bourgogne-Franche-Comté
- Department: Jura
- Arrondissement: Lons-le-Saunier
- Canton: Lons-le-Saunier-2
- Intercommunality: Espace Communautaire Lons Agglomération

Government
  - Mayor (2020–2026): Sylvie Lagarde
- Area^{1}: 4.36 km^{2} (1.68 sq mi)
- Highest elevation: 550 m (1,800 ft)
- Lowest elevation: 378 m (1,240 ft)
- Population (2023): 193
  - Density: 44.3/km^{2} (115/sq mi)
- Time zone: UTC+01:00 (CET)
  - Summer (DST): UTC+02:00 (CEST)
- INSEE/Postal code: 39250 /39570
- ^{1} French Land Register data, which excludes lakes, ponds, glaciers > 1 km^{2} (0.386 sq mi or 247 acres) and river estuaries.

Geruge (French pronunciation: [ʒəʁyʒ]) is a commune in the Jura department in Bourgogne-Franche-Comté in eastern France.

== Population ==
Historical population
Year	Pop.	±% p.a.
1968	88	—
1975	82	−1.00%
1982	78	−0.71%
1990	87	+1.37%
1999	146	+5.92%
2007	161	+1.23%
2012	166	+0.61%
2017	169	+0.36%
2023	193	+2.24%
Source: INSEE

== See also ==
- Communes of the Jura department
