= Chamberland filter =

Porcelain water filter

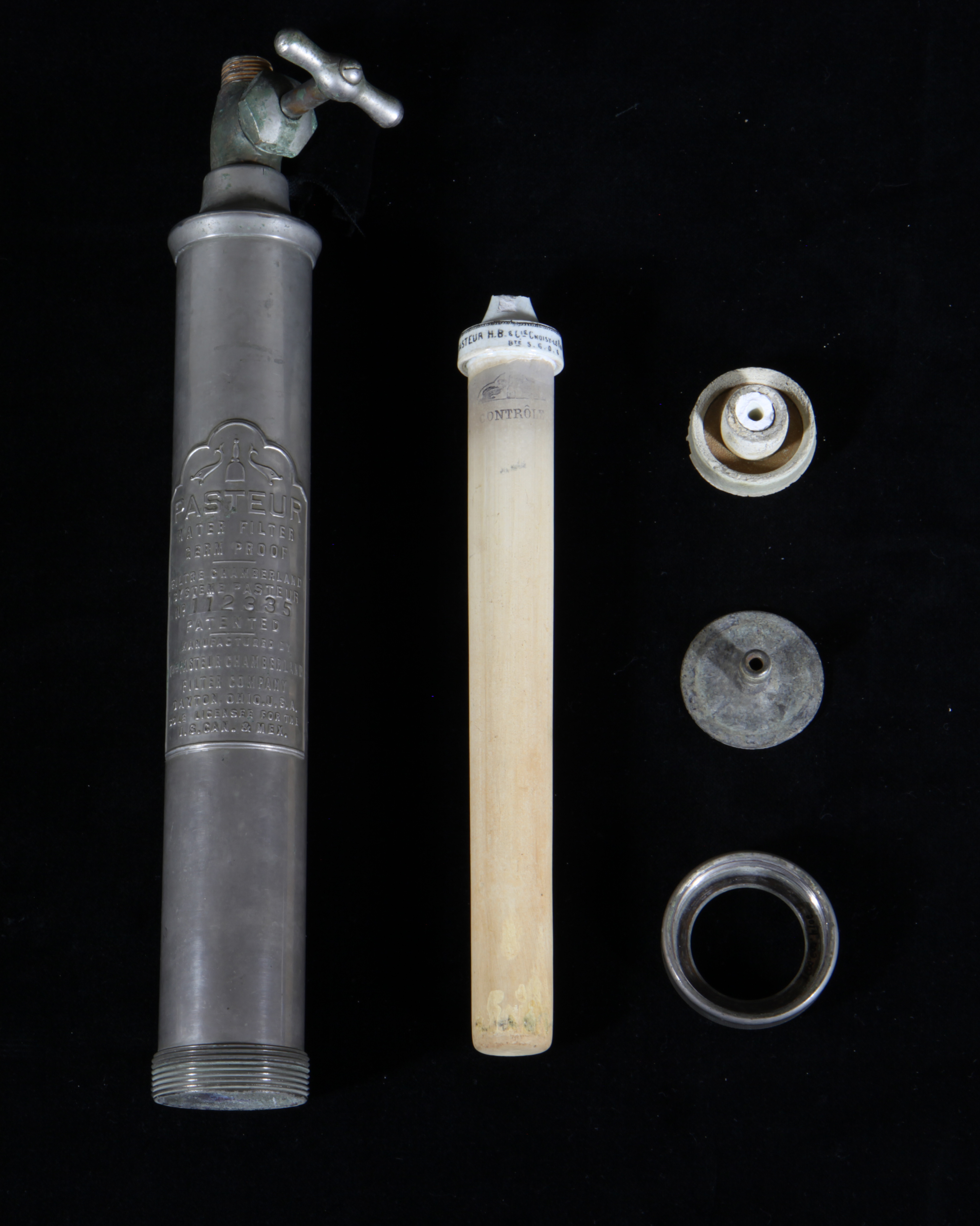
Components of a Pasteur-Chamberland filter

A Chamberland filter, also known as a Pasteur–Chamberland filter, is a porcelain water filter invented by Charles Chamberland in 1884. It was developed after Henry Doulton's ceramic water filter of 1827. It is similar to the Berkefeld filter in principle.

== Design ==
Schematic diagram of a Chamberland filter

The filter consists of a permeable unglazed porcelain tube (called bisque) that contains a ring of glazed porcelain through which the inflow pipe fits. The core of the porcelain is made up of a metal pipe with holes through which water flows out and is collected. Inflow is pressurized so filtration occurs under force.

There are 13 types: L_{1} to L_{13}. L_{1} filters have the coarsest pore size while L_{13} have the finest.

== Usefulness ==
The Pasteur-Chamberland filter is as useful as other ceramic filters. It is a good bacterial water filter used mainly as a high volume water filter. The filter works more quickly when the water supplied is under pressure. As with other filters of its kind, it cannot filter very small particles like viruses or mycoplasma. It is used in removal of organisms from a fluid culture in order to obtain the bacterial toxins.

== History ==
The Chamberland filter was developed by Charles Edouard Chamberland, one of Louis Pasteur’s assistants in Paris. The original intention was to produce filtered water, free of bacteria, for use in Pasteur's experiments.

The filter became increasingly known for its ability to filter out bacteria, the smallest living organisms then known. The filter was patented by Chamberland and Pasteur in America and Europe. An American company licensed the name in Ohio. They sold filters to private homes, hotels, restaurants, and the 1893 Chicago World's Columbian Exposition.

Use of the Pasteur-Chamberland filter led to the discovery that diphtheria and tetanus toxins, among others, could still cause illness even after filtration. Identification of these toxins contributed to the development of antitoxins to treat such diseases. It was also discovered that a type of substance, initially known as a "filterable virus", passed through the smallest Pasteur-Chamberland filters, and replicated itself inside living cells. The discovery that biological entities smaller than bacteria existed was important in establishing the field of virology.
