= Messia-sur-Sorne =

Commune in Bourgogne-Franche-Comté, France

- Commune
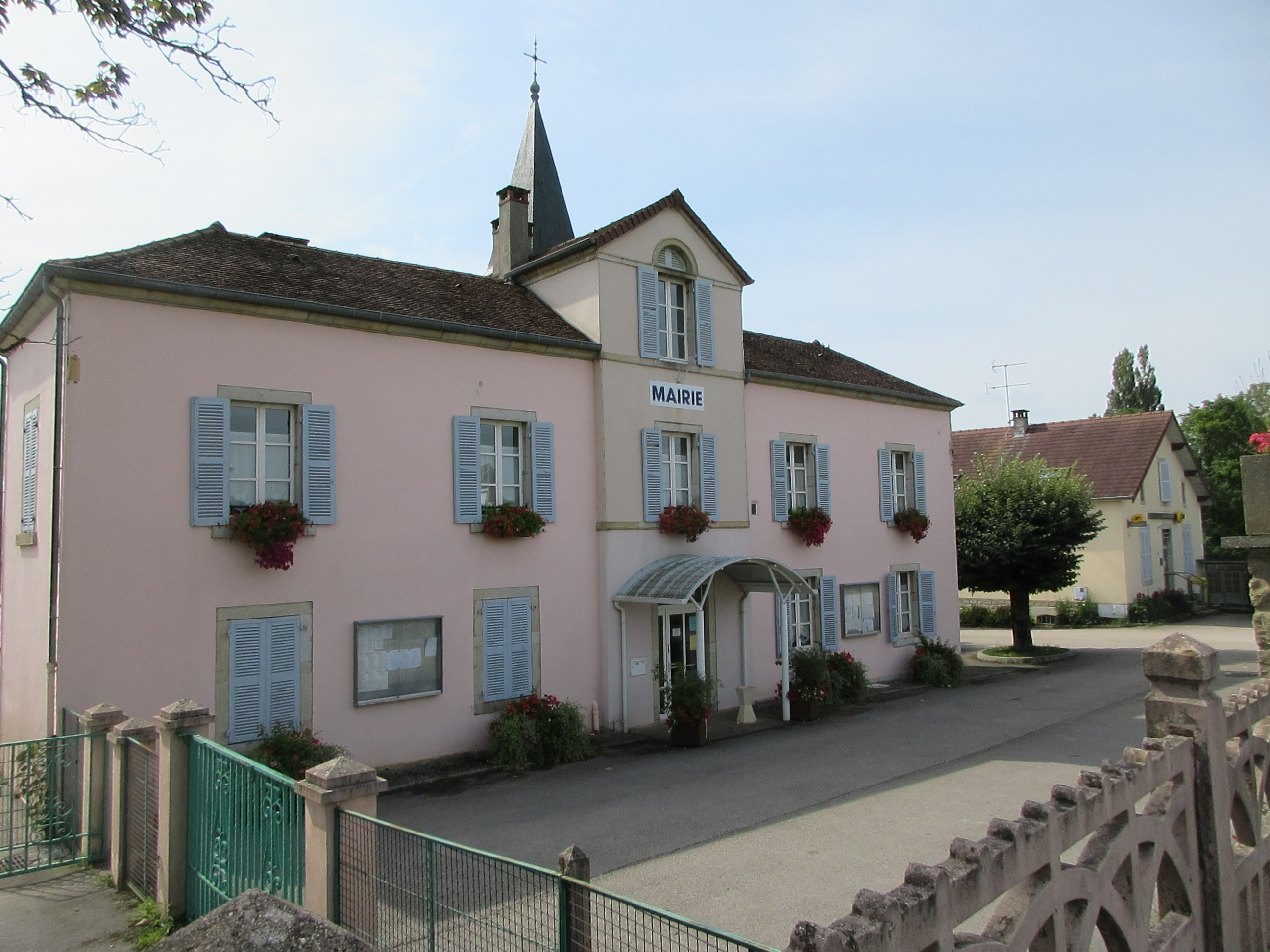
- The town hall in Messia-sur-Sorne
- Location of Messia-sur-Sorne
- Location within France Location within Bourgogne-Franche-Comté
- Coordinates: 46°39′47″N 5°30′47″E
- Country: France
- Region: Bourgogne-Franche-Comté
- Department: Jura
- Arrondissement: Lons-le-Saunier
- Canton: Lons-le-Saunier-2
- Intercommunality: Espace Communautaire Lons Agglomération

Government
  - Mayor (2020–2026): Patricia Chanet Mocellin
- Area^{1}: 2.69 km^{2} (1.04 sq mi)
- Highest elevation: 356 m (1,168 ft)
- Lowest elevation: 233 m (764 ft)
- Population (2023): 911
  - Density: 339/km^{2} (877/sq mi)
- Time zone: UTC+01:00 (CET)
  - Summer (DST): UTC+02:00 (CEST)
- INSEE/Postal code: 39327 /39570
- ^{1} French Land Register data, which excludes lakes, ponds, glaciers > 1 km^{2} (0.386 sq mi or 247 acres) and river estuaries.

Messia-sur-Sorne (French pronunciation: [mesja syʁ sɔʁn]) is a commune in the Jura department in Bourgogne-Franche-Comté in eastern France.

== Population ==
Historical population
Year	Pop.	±% p.a.
1968	869	—
1975	755	−1.99%
1982	744	−0.21%
1990	739	−0.08%
1999	804	+0.94%
2007	839	+0.53%
2012	838	−0.02%
2017	842	+0.10%
2023	911	+1.32%
Source: INSEE

== See also ==
- Communes of the Jura department
