= Bornay =

Commune in Bourgogne-Franche-Comté, France

- Commune
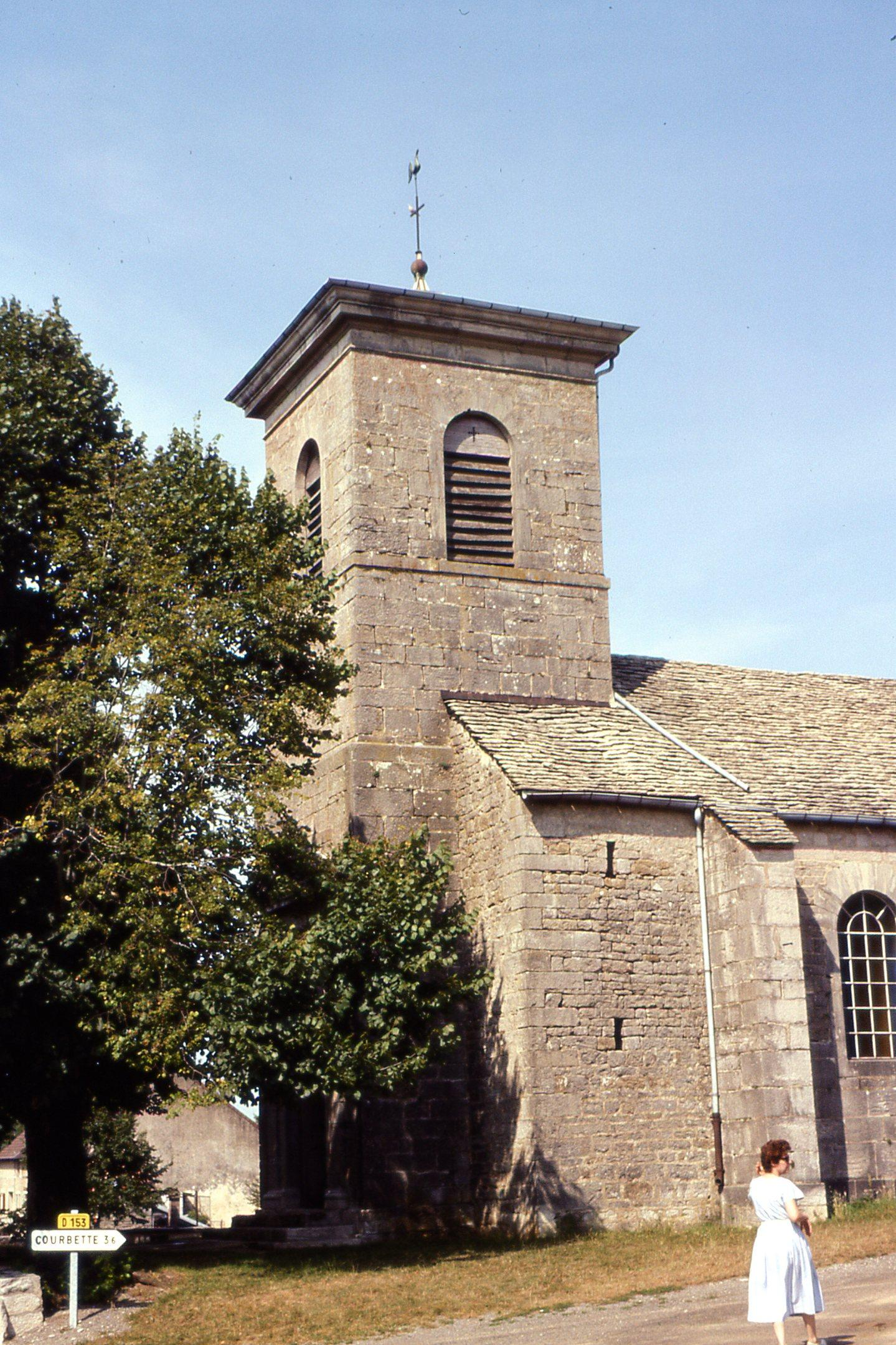
- The church in Bornay
- Location of Bornay
- Location within France Location within Bourgogne-Franche-Comté
- Coordinates: 46°36′55″N 5°33′20″E
- Country: France
- Region: Bourgogne-Franche-Comté
- Department: Jura
- Arrondissement: Lons-le-Saunier
- Canton: Lons-le-Saunier-2
- Intercommunality: Espace Communautaire Lons Agglomération

Government
  - Mayor (2020–2026): Patrick Tartavez
- Area^{1}: 6.76 km^{2} (2.61 sq mi)
- Highest elevation: 629 m (2,064 ft)
- Lowest elevation: 335 m (1,099 ft)
- Population (2023): 184
  - Density: 27.2/km^{2} (70.5/sq mi)
- Time zone: UTC+01:00 (CET)
  - Summer (DST): UTC+02:00 (CEST)
- INSEE/Postal code: 39066 /39570
- ^{1} French Land Register data, which excludes lakes, ponds, glaciers > 1 km^{2} (0.386 sq mi or 247 acres) and river estuaries.

Bornay (French pronunciation: [bɔʁnɛ]) is a commune in the Jura department in Bourgogne-Franche-Comté in eastern France.

== Population ==
Historical population
Year	Pop.	±% p.a.
1968	117	—
1975	101	−2.08%
1982	151	+5.91%
1990	177	+2.01%
1999	181	+0.25%
2007	178	−0.21%
2012	173	−0.57%
2017	176	+0.34%
2023	184	+0.74%
Source: INSEE

== See also ==
- Communes of the Jura department
