= Vernantois =

- Commune
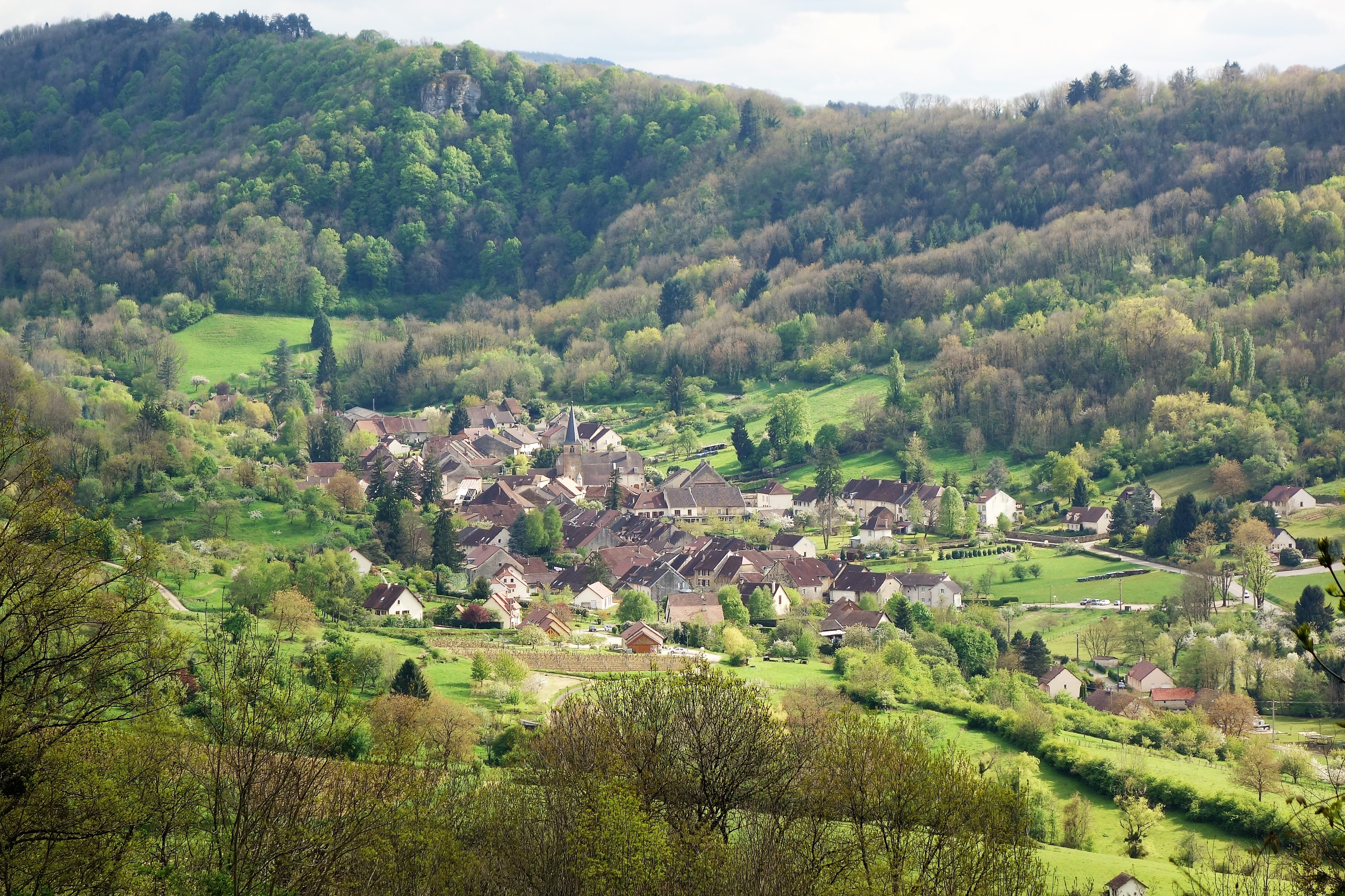
- A general view of Vernantois

- Coat of arms
- Location of Vernantois
- Location within France Location within Bourgogne-Franche-Comté
- Coordinates: 46°37′46″N 5°34′37″E
- Country: France
- Region: Bourgogne-Franche-Comté
- Department: Jura
- Arrondissement: Lons-le-Saunier
- Canton: Lons-le-Saunier-2
- Intercommunality: Espace Communautaire Lons Agglomération

Government
  - Mayor (2020–2026): Monique Pyon
- Area^{1}: 6.99 km^{2} (2.70 sq mi)
- Highest elevation: 617 m (2,024 ft)
- Lowest elevation: 294 m (965 ft)
- Population (2023): 298
  - Density: 42.6/km^{2} (110/sq mi)
- Time zone: UTC+01:00 (CET)
  - Summer (DST): UTC+02:00 (CEST)
- INSEE/Postal code: 39552 /39570
- ^{1} French Land Register data, which excludes lakes, ponds, glaciers > 1 km^{2} (0.386 sq mi or 247 acres) and river estuaries.

Vernantois (French pronunciation: [vɛʁnɑ̃twa]) is a commune in the Jura department in the Bourgogne-Franche-Comté region in eastern France.

== Population ==
Historical population
Year	Pop.	±% p.a.
1968	264	—
1975	256	−0.44%
1982	274	+0.98%
1990	273	−0.05%
1999	273	+0.00%
2007	306	+1.44%
2012	337	+1.95%
2017	328	−0.54%
2023	298	−1.59%
Source: INSEE

== See also ==
- Communes of the Jura department
