= Gevingey =

Commune in Bourgogne-Franche-Comté, France

- Commune
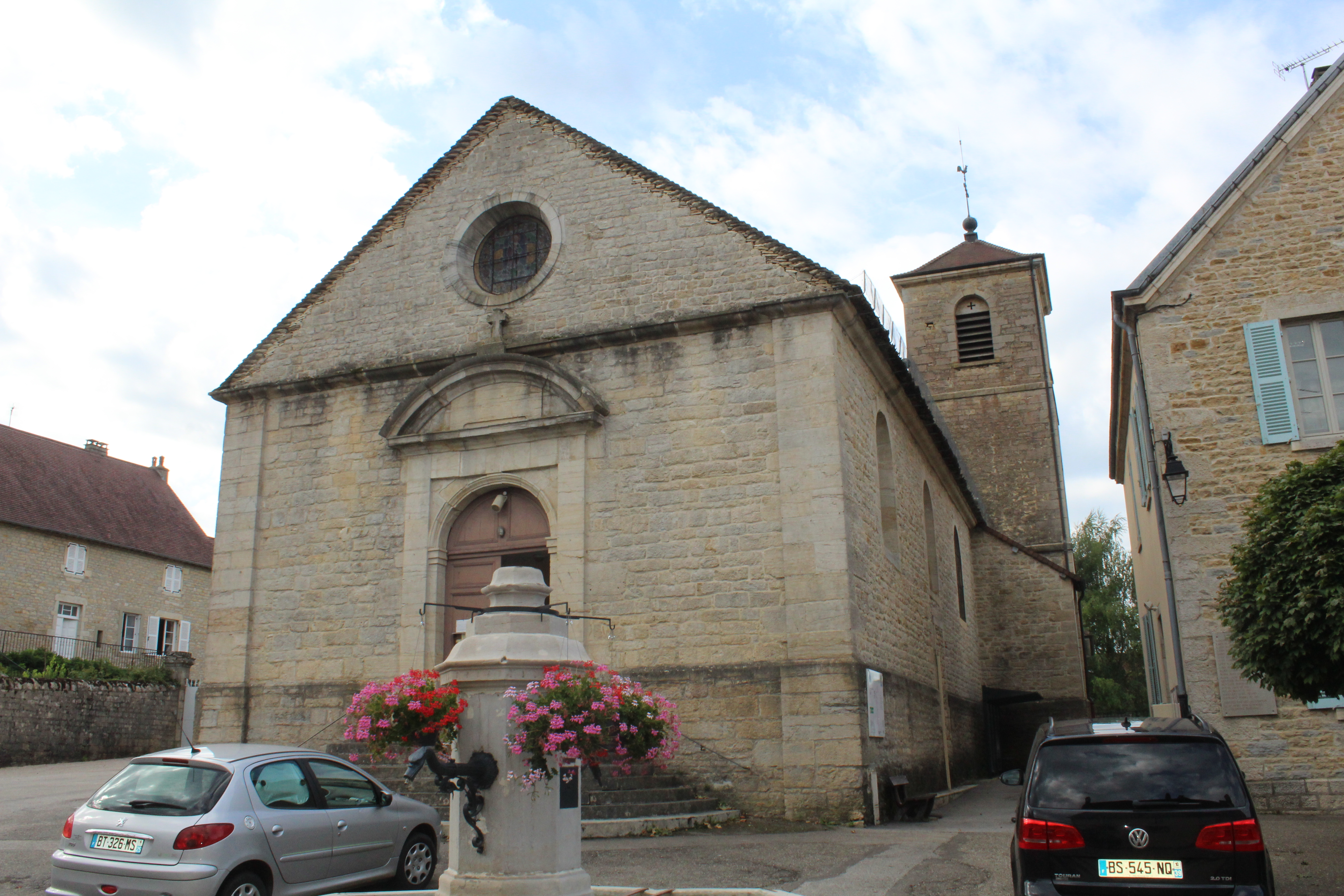
- The church in Gevingey

- Coat of arms
- Location of Gevingey
- Location within France Location within Bourgogne-Franche-Comté
- Coordinates: 46°38′15″N 5°30′25″E
- Country: France
- Region: Bourgogne-Franche-Comté
- Department: Jura
- Arrondissement: Lons-le-Saunier
- Canton: Lons-le-Saunier-2
- Intercommunality: Espace Communautaire Lons Agglomération

Government
  - Mayor (2020–2026): Louis Cauzo
- Area^{1}: 5.90 km^{2} (2.28 sq mi)
- Highest elevation: 487 m (1,598 ft)
- Lowest elevation: 242 m (794 ft)
- Population (2023): 442
  - Density: 74.9/km^{2} (194/sq mi)
- Time zone: UTC+01:00 (CET)
  - Summer (DST): UTC+02:00 (CEST)
- INSEE/Postal code: 39251 /39570
- ^{1} French Land Register data, which excludes lakes, ponds, glaciers > 1 km^{2} (0.386 sq mi or 247 acres) and river estuaries.

Gevingey (French pronunciation: [ʒəvɛ̃ʒɛ]) is a commune in the Jura department in Bourgogne-Franche-Comté in eastern France.

== Population ==
Historical population
Year	Pop.	±% p.a.
1968	405	—
1975	369	−1.32%
1982	379	+0.38%
1990	384	+0.16%
1999	417	+0.92%
2007	462	+1.29%
2012	450	−0.52%
2017	451	+0.04%
2023	442	−0.34%
Source: INSEE

== See also ==
- Communes of the Jura department
