= Publy =

Commune in Bourgogne-Franche-Comté, France

- Commune
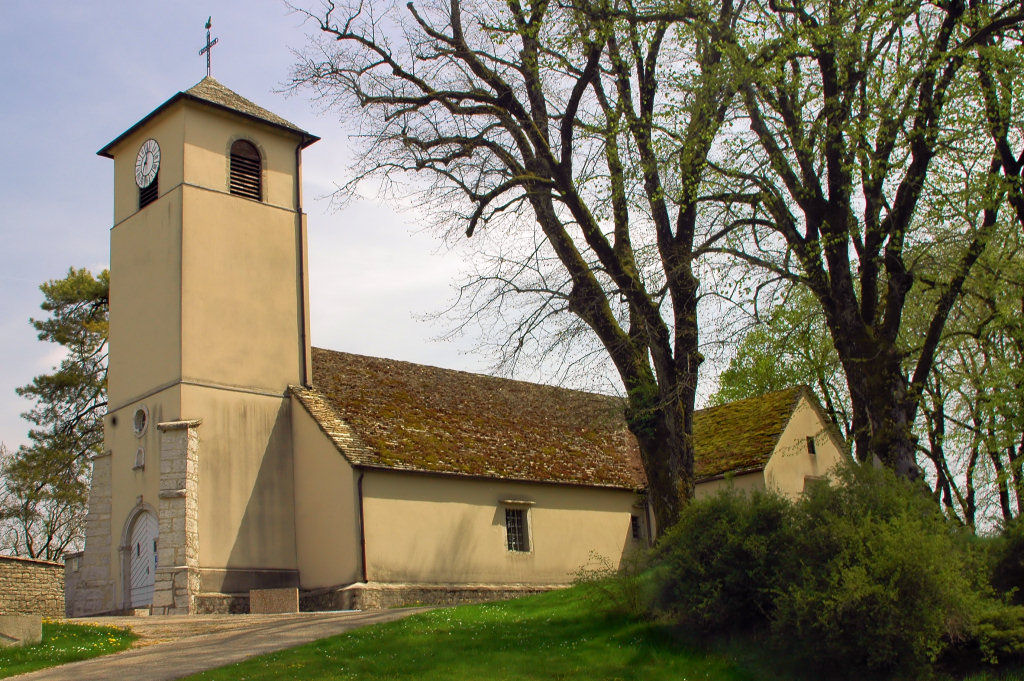
- The church in Publy

- Coat of arms
- Location of Publy
- Location within France Location within Bourgogne-Franche-Comté
- Coordinates: 46°38′00″N 5°38′36″E
- Country: France
- Region: Bourgogne-Franche-Comté
- Department: Jura
- Arrondissement: Lons-le-Saunier
- Canton: Poligny
- Intercommunality: Espace Communautaire Lons Agglomération

Government
  - Mayor (2020–2026): Stéphane Issanchou
- Area^{1}: 15.18 km^{2} (5.86 sq mi)
- Highest elevation: 669 m (2,195 ft)
- Lowest elevation: 471 m (1,545 ft)
- Population (2023): 277
  - Density: 18.2/km^{2} (47.3/sq mi)
- Time zone: UTC+01:00 (CET)
  - Summer (DST): UTC+02:00 (CEST)
- INSEE/Postal code: 39445 /39570
- ^{1} French Land Register data, which excludes lakes, ponds, glaciers > 1 km^{2} (0.386 sq mi or 247 acres) and river estuaries.

Publy (French pronunciation: [pybli]) is a commune in the Jura department in Bourgogne-Franche-Comté in eastern France.

== Population ==
Historical population
Year	Pop.	±% p.a.
1968	290	—
1975	248	−2.21%
1982	281	+1.80%
1990	287	+0.26%
1999	262	−1.01%
2007	286	+1.10%
2012	282	−0.28%
2017	285	+0.21%
2023	277	−0.47%
Source: INSEE

== See also ==
- Communes of the Jura department
