= Vevy =

- Commune
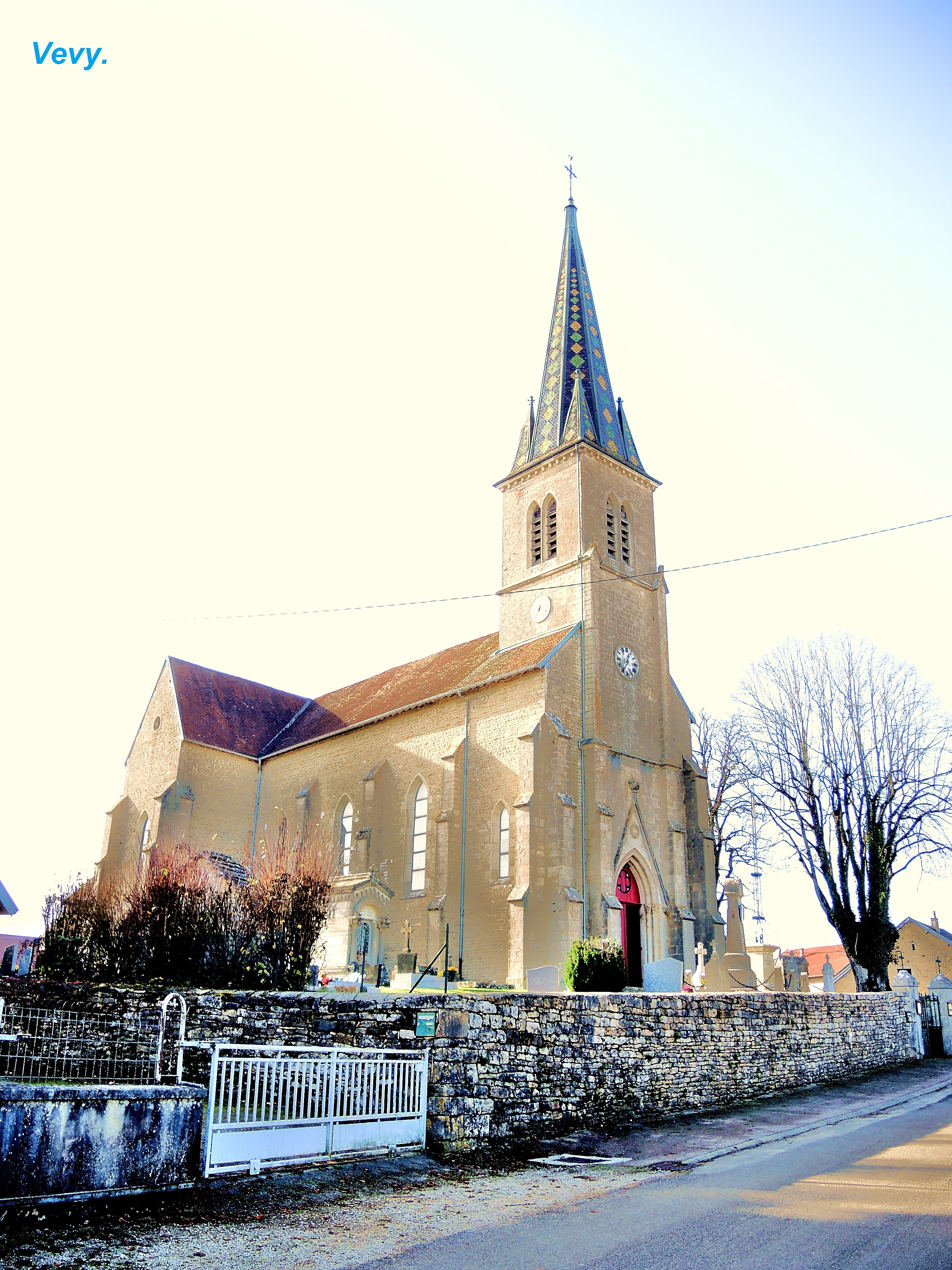
- The church in Vevy
- Location of Vevy
- Location within France Location within Bourgogne-Franche-Comté
- Coordinates: 46°39′57″N 5°39′00″E
- Country: France
- Region: Bourgogne-Franche-Comté
- Department: Jura
- Arrondissement: Lons-le-Saunier
- Canton: Poligny
- Intercommunality: Espace Communautaire Lons Agglomération

Government
  - Mayor (2020–2026): Claude Janier
- Area^{1}: 9.62 km^{2} (3.71 sq mi)
- Highest elevation: 556 m (1,824 ft)
- Lowest elevation: 501 m (1,644 ft)
- Population (2023): 301
  - Density: 31.3/km^{2} (81.0/sq mi)
- Time zone: UTC+01:00 (CET)
  - Summer (DST): UTC+02:00 (CEST)
- INSEE/Postal code: 39558 /39570
- ^{1} French Land Register data, which excludes lakes, ponds, glaciers > 1 km^{2} (0.386 sq mi or 247 acres) and river estuaries.

Vevy (French pronunciation: [vəvi]) is a commune in the Jura department in the Bourgogne-Franche-Comté region in eastern France.

== Population ==
Historical population
Year	Pop.	±% p.a.
1968	162	—
1975	152	−0.91%
1982	175	+2.03%
1990	234	+3.70%
1999	257	+1.05%
2007	250	−0.34%
2012	248	−0.16%
2017	274	+2.01%
2023	301	+1.58%
Source: INSEE

== See also ==
- Communes of the Jura department
