= Verges, Jura =

Verges
- Commune
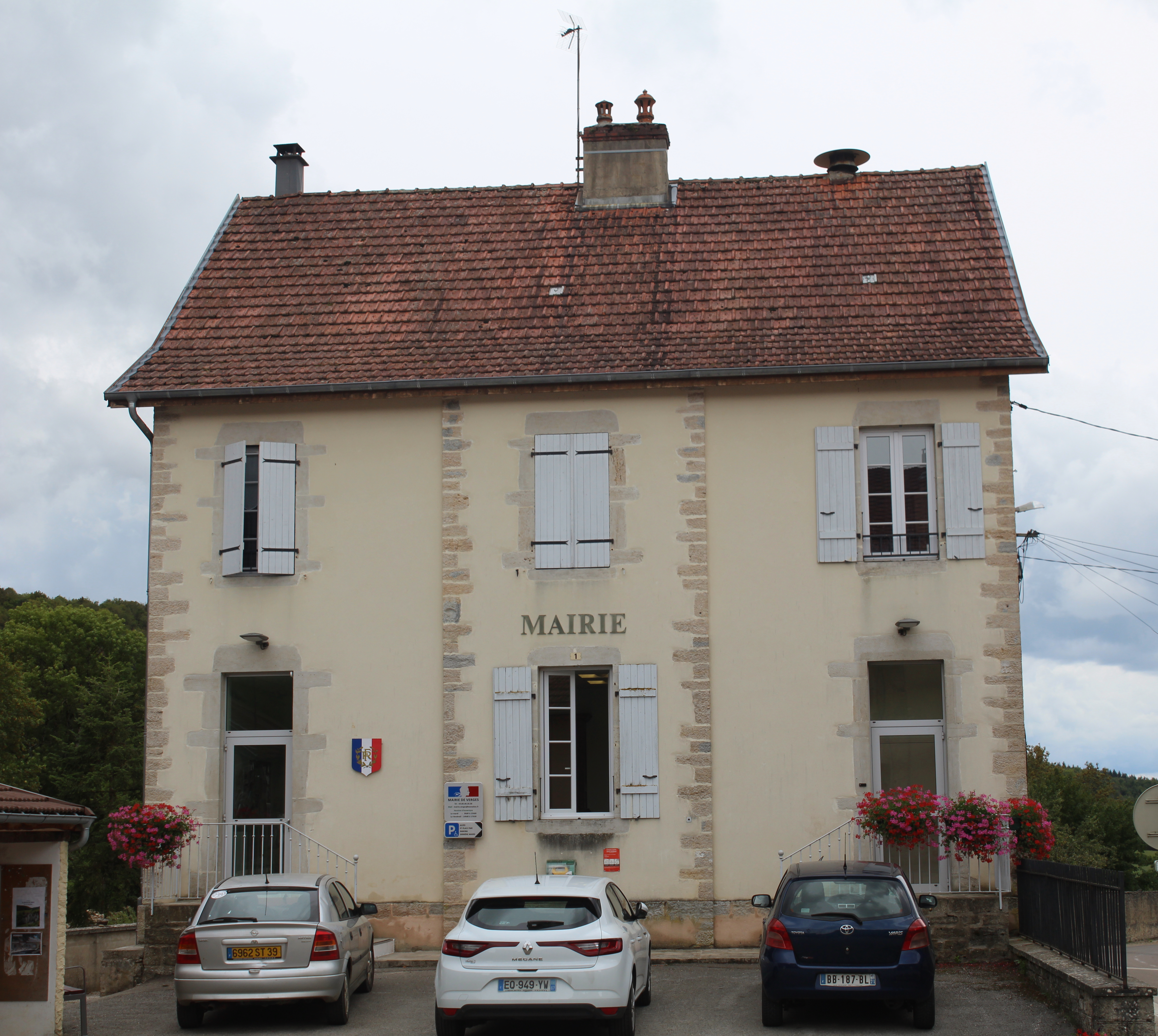
- The town hall in Verges
- Location of Verges
- Location within France Location within Bourgogne-Franche-Comté
- Coordinates: 46°39′15″N 5°41′00″E
- Country: France
- Region: Bourgogne-Franche-Comté
- Department: Jura
- Arrondissement: Lons-le-Saunier
- Canton: Poligny
- Intercommunality: Espace Communautaire Lons Agglomération

Government
  - Mayor (2020–2026): Emmanuel Faivre
- Area^{1}: 6.16 km^{2} (2.38 sq mi)
- Highest elevation: 613 m (2,011 ft)
- Lowest elevation: 500 m (1,600 ft)
- Population (2023): 204
  - Density: 33.1/km^{2} (85.8/sq mi)
- Time zone: UTC+01:00 (CET)
  - Summer (DST): UTC+02:00 (CEST)
- INSEE/Postal code: 39550 /39570
- ^{1} French Land Register data, which excludes lakes, ponds, glaciers > 1 km^{2} (0.386 sq mi or 247 acres) and river estuaries.

Verges (French pronunciation: [vɛʁʒ]) is a commune in the Jura department in the Bourgogne-Franche-Comté region in eastern France.

== Population ==
Historical population
Year	Pop.	±% p.a.
1968	95	—
1975	90	−0.77%
1982	134	+5.85%
1990	154	+1.75%
1999	169	+1.04%
2007	172	+0.22%
2012	183	+1.25%
2017	191	+0.86%
2023	204	+1.10%
Source: INSEE

== See also ==
- Communes of the Jura department
