= Moiron =

Commune in Bourgogne-Franche-Comté, France

- Commune
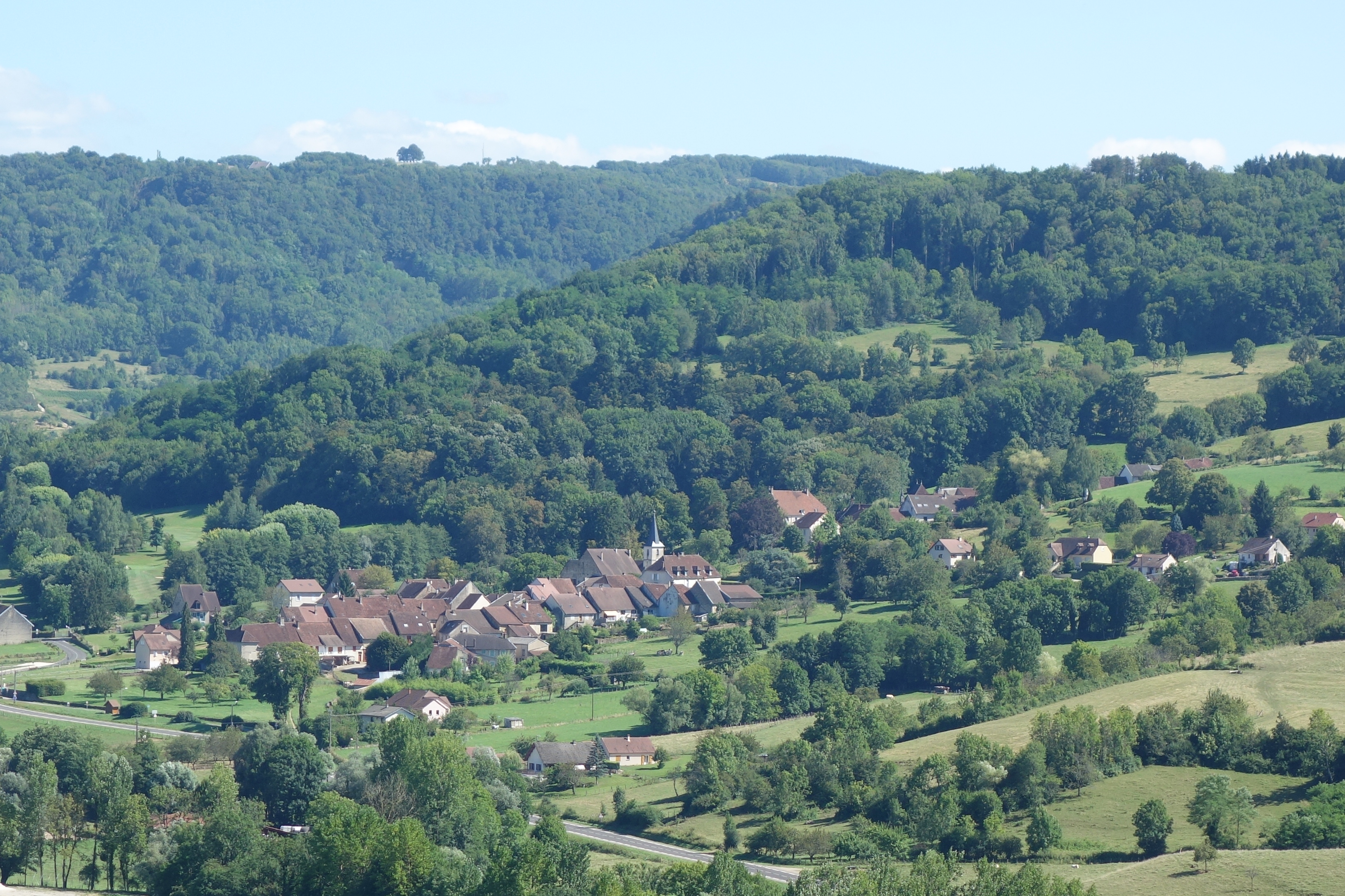
- A general view of Moiron
- Location of Moiron
- Location within France Location within Bourgogne-Franche-Comté
- Coordinates: 46°38′20″N 5°33′46″E
- Country: France
- Region: Bourgogne-Franche-Comté
- Department: Jura
- Arrondissement: Lons-le-Saunier
- Canton: Lons-le-Saunier-2
- Intercommunality: Espace Communautaire Lons Agglomération

Government
  - Mayor (2020–2026): Gérard Jaillet
- Area^{1}: 1.85 km^{2} (0.71 sq mi)
- Highest elevation: 492 m (1,614 ft)
- Lowest elevation: 281 m (922 ft)
- Population (2023): 127
  - Density: 68.6/km^{2} (178/sq mi)
- Time zone: UTC+01:00 (CET)
  - Summer (DST): UTC+02:00 (CEST)
- INSEE/Postal code: 39334 /39570
- ^{1} French Land Register data, which excludes lakes, ponds, glaciers > 1 km^{2} (0.386 sq mi or 247 acres) and river estuaries.

Moiron (French pronunciation: [mwaʁɔ̃]) is a commune in the Jura department in Bourgogne-Franche-Comté in eastern France.

== Population ==
Historical population
| Year | Pop. | ±% p.a. |
|---|---|---|
| 1968 | 146 | — |
| 1975 | 131 | −1.54% |
| 1982 | 107 | −2.85% |
| 1990 | 104 | −0.35% |
| 1999 | 135 | +2.94% |
| 2007 | 129 | −0.57% |
| 2012 | 141 | +1.79% |
| 2017 | 130 | −1.61% |
| 2023 | 127 | −0.39% |
Source: INSEE

== See also ==
- Communes of the Jura department
