= Trenal =

- Commune
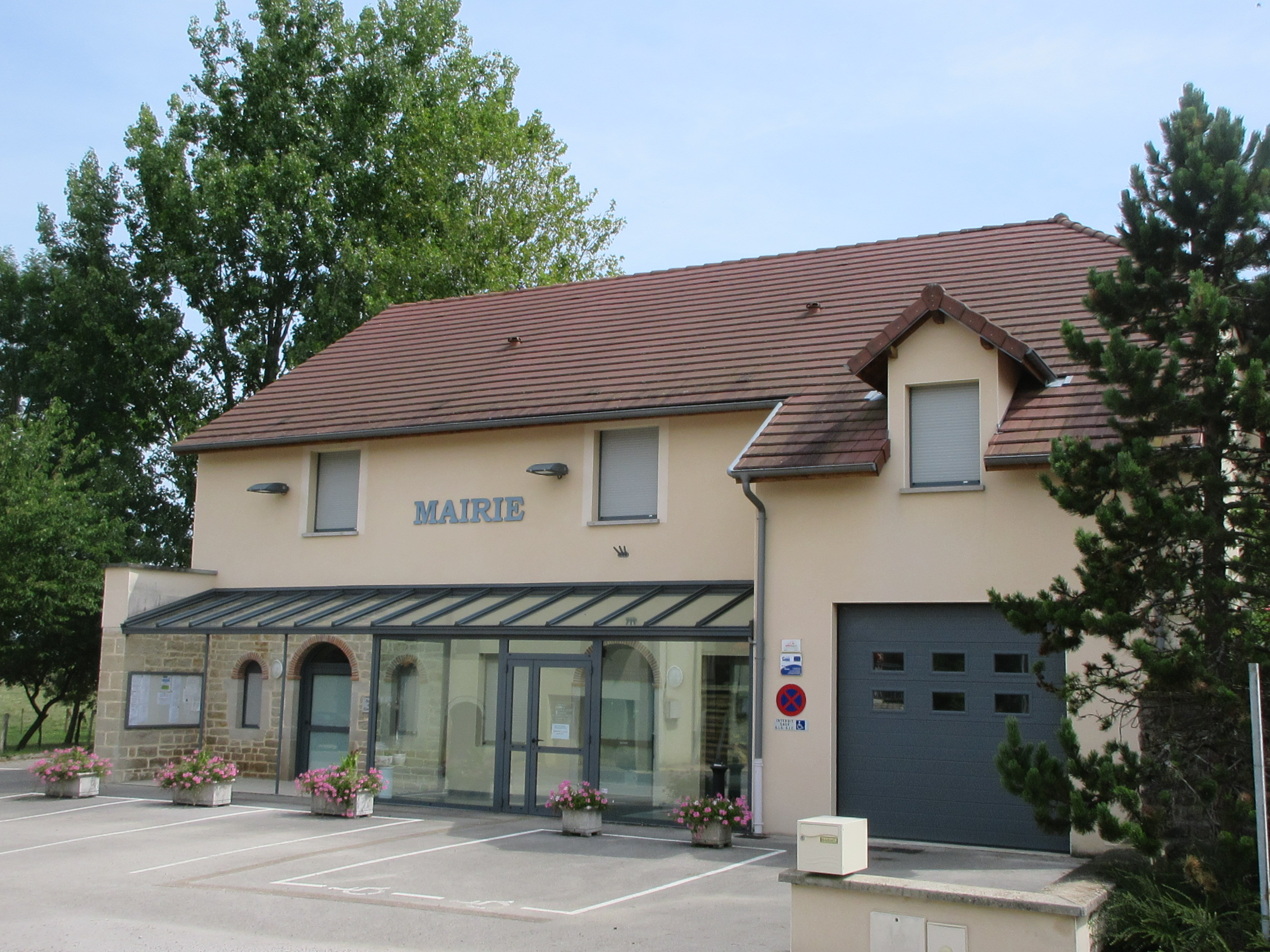
- The town hall in Trenal

- Coat of arms
- Location of Trenal
- Location within France Location within Bourgogne-Franche-Comté
- Coordinates: 46°38′38″N 5°28′06″E
- Country: France
- Region: Bourgogne-Franche-Comté
- Department: Jura
- Arrondissement: Lons-le-Saunier
- Canton: Lons-le-Saunier-2
- Intercommunality: Espace Communautaire Lons Agglomération

Government
  - Mayor (2020–2026): Marie-France Lucius
- Area^{1}: 9.54 km^{2} (3.68 sq mi)
- Highest elevation: 260 m (850 ft)
- Lowest elevation: 198 m (650 ft)
- Population (2023): 472
  - Density: 49.5/km^{2} (128/sq mi)
- Time zone: UTC+01:00 (CET)
  - Summer (DST): UTC+02:00 (CEST)
- INSEE/Postal code: 39537 /39570
- ^{1} French Land Register data, which excludes lakes, ponds, glaciers > 1 km^{2} (0.386 sq mi or 247 acres) and river estuaries.

Trenal (French pronunciation: [tʁənal]) is a commune in the Jura department in the Bourgogne-Franche-Comté region in eastern France. On 1 January 2017, the former commune of Mallerey was merged into Trenal.

== Population ==
Historical population
Year	Pop.	±% p.a.
1968	348	—
1975	326	−0.93%
1982	308	−0.81%
1990	390	+2.99%
1999	410	+0.56%
2007	420	+0.30%
2012	434	+0.66%
2017	459	+1.13%
2023	472	+0.47%
Source: INSEE

Population data refer to the area corresponding with the commune as of January 2025.

== See also ==
- Communes of the Jura department
