= Frébuans =

Commune in Bourgogne-Franche-Comté, France

- Commune
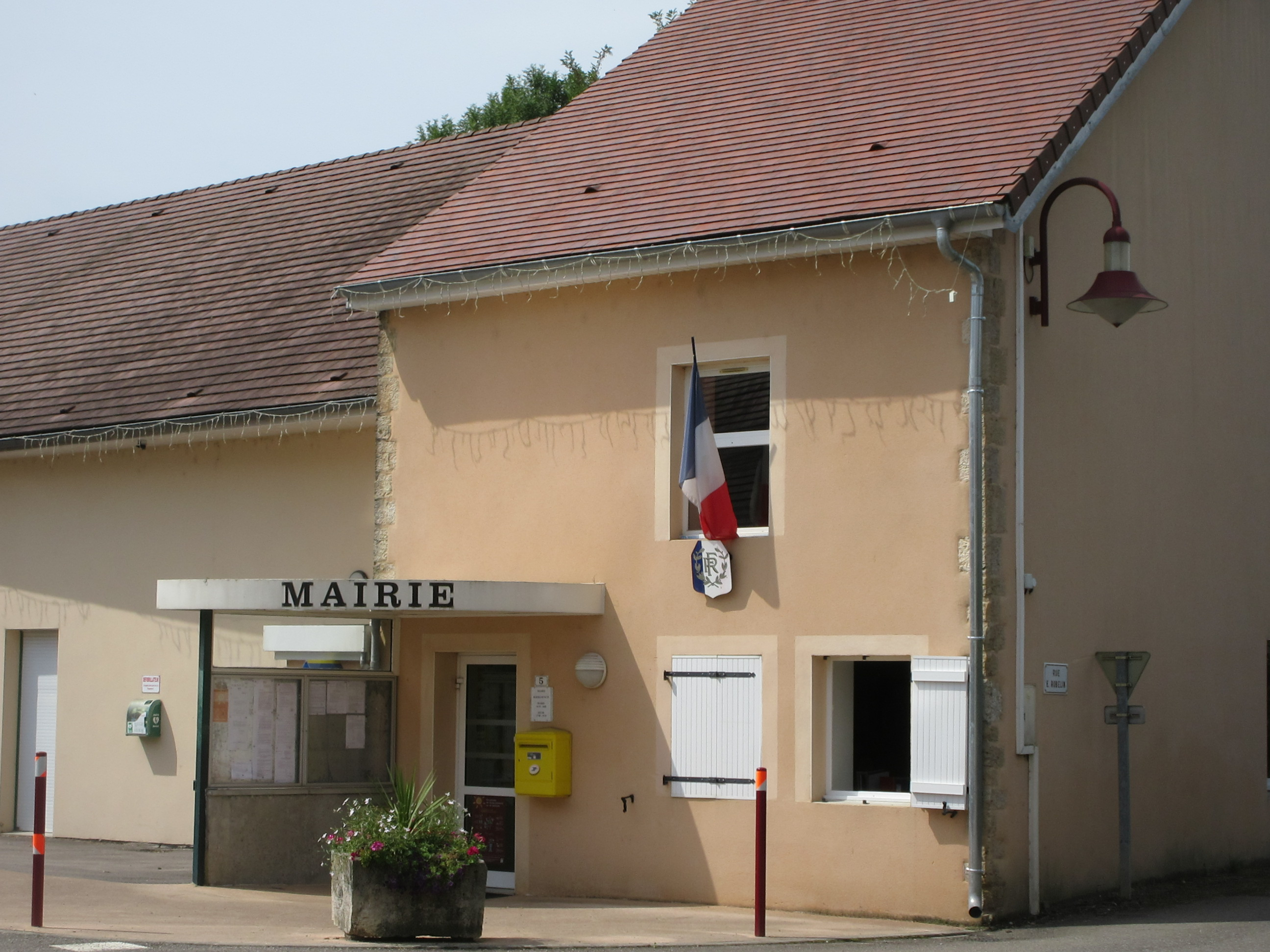
- The town hall in Frébuans
- Location of Frébuans
- Location within France Location within Bourgogne-Franche-Comté
- Coordinates: 46°39′12″N 5°29′15″E
- Country: France
- Region: Bourgogne-Franche-Comté
- Department: Jura
- Arrondissement: Lons-le-Saunier
- Canton: Lons-le-Saunier-2
- Intercommunality: Espace Communautaire Lons Agglomération

Government
  - Mayor (2020–2026): Paulette Marano
- Area^{1}: 2.65 km^{2} (1.02 sq mi)
- Highest elevation: 271 m (889 ft)
- Lowest elevation: 209 m (686 ft)
- Population (2023): 386
  - Density: 146/km^{2} (377/sq mi)
- Time zone: UTC+01:00 (CET)
  - Summer (DST): UTC+02:00 (CEST)
- INSEE/Postal code: 39241 /39570
- ^{1} French Land Register data, which excludes lakes, ponds, glaciers > 1 km^{2} (0.386 sq mi or 247 acres) and river estuaries.

Frébuans (French pronunciation: [fʁebɥɑ̃]) is a commune in the Jura department in Bourgogne-Franche-Comté in eastern France.

== Population ==
Historical population
Year	Pop.	±% p.a.
1968	196	—
1975	248	+3.42%
1982	343	+4.74%
1990	343	+0.00%
1999	345	+0.06%
2007	337	−0.29%
2012	380	+2.43%
2017	373	−0.37%
2023	386	+0.57%
Source: INSEE

== See also ==
- Communes of the Jura department
