= Mallerey =

- Part of Trenal
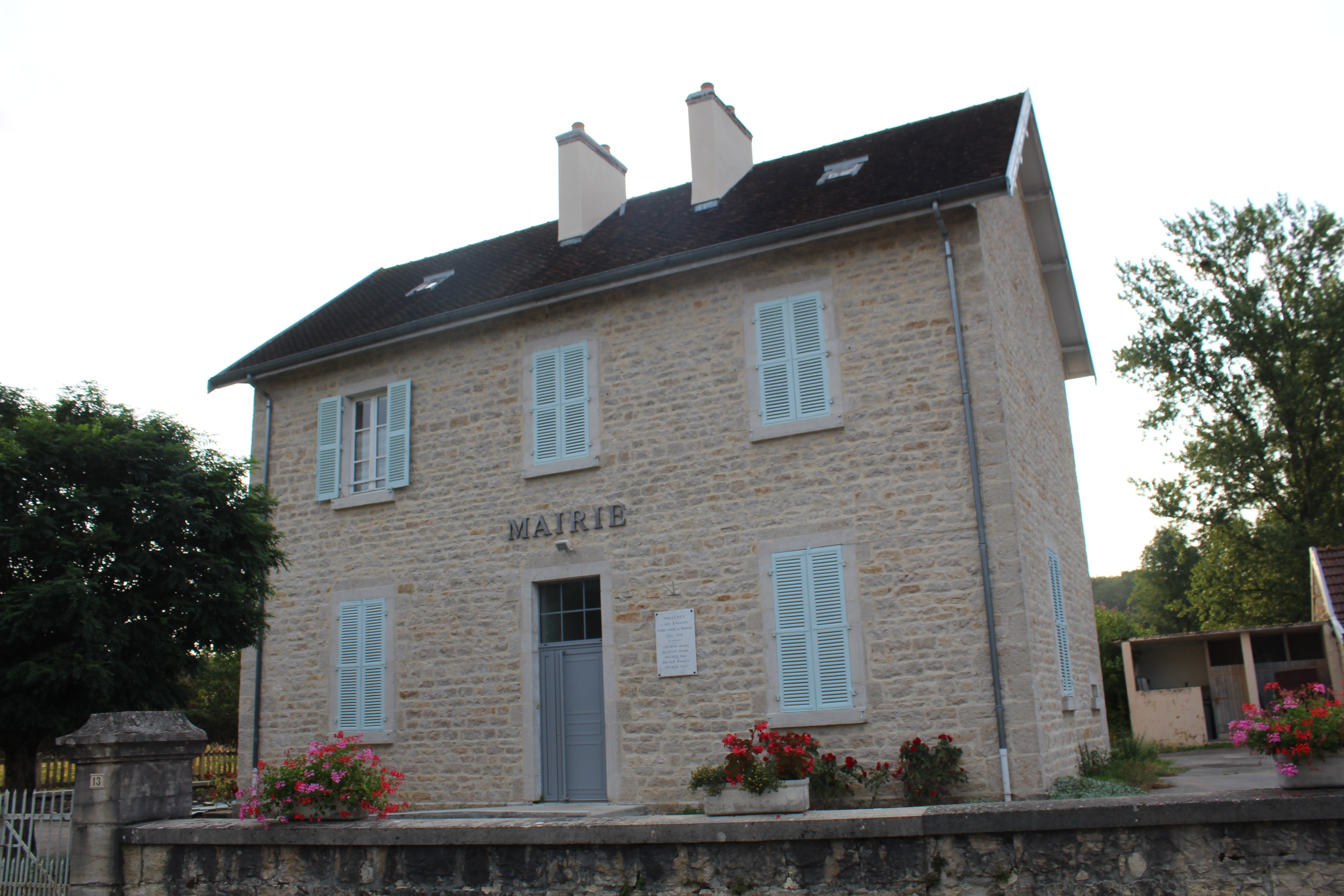
- Town hall
- Location of Mallerey
- Location within France Location within Bourgogne-Franche-Comté
- Coordinates: 46°37′56″N 5°26′55″E
- Country: France
- Region: Bourgogne-Franche-Comté
- Department: Jura
- Arrondissement: Lons-le-Saunier
- Canton: Saint-Amour
- Commune: Trenal
- Area^{1}: 2.90 km^{2} (1.12 sq mi)
- Highest elevation: 228 m (748 ft)
- Lowest elevation: 196 m (643 ft)
- Population (2019): 72
  - Density: 25/km^{2} (64/sq mi)
- Time zone: UTC+01:00 (CET)
  - Summer (DST): UTC+02:00 (CEST)
- Postal code: 39190
- ^{1} French Land Register data, which excludes lakes, ponds, glaciers > 1 km^{2} (0.386 sq mi or 247 acres) and river estuaries.

Mallerey (French pronunciation: [malʁɛ]) is a former commune in the Jura department in Bourgogne-Franche-Comté in eastern France. On 1 January 2017, it was merged into the commune Trenal.

== See also ==
- Communes of the Jura department
