= Le Pin, Jura =

Commune in Bourgogne-Franche-Comté, France

Le Pin
- Commune
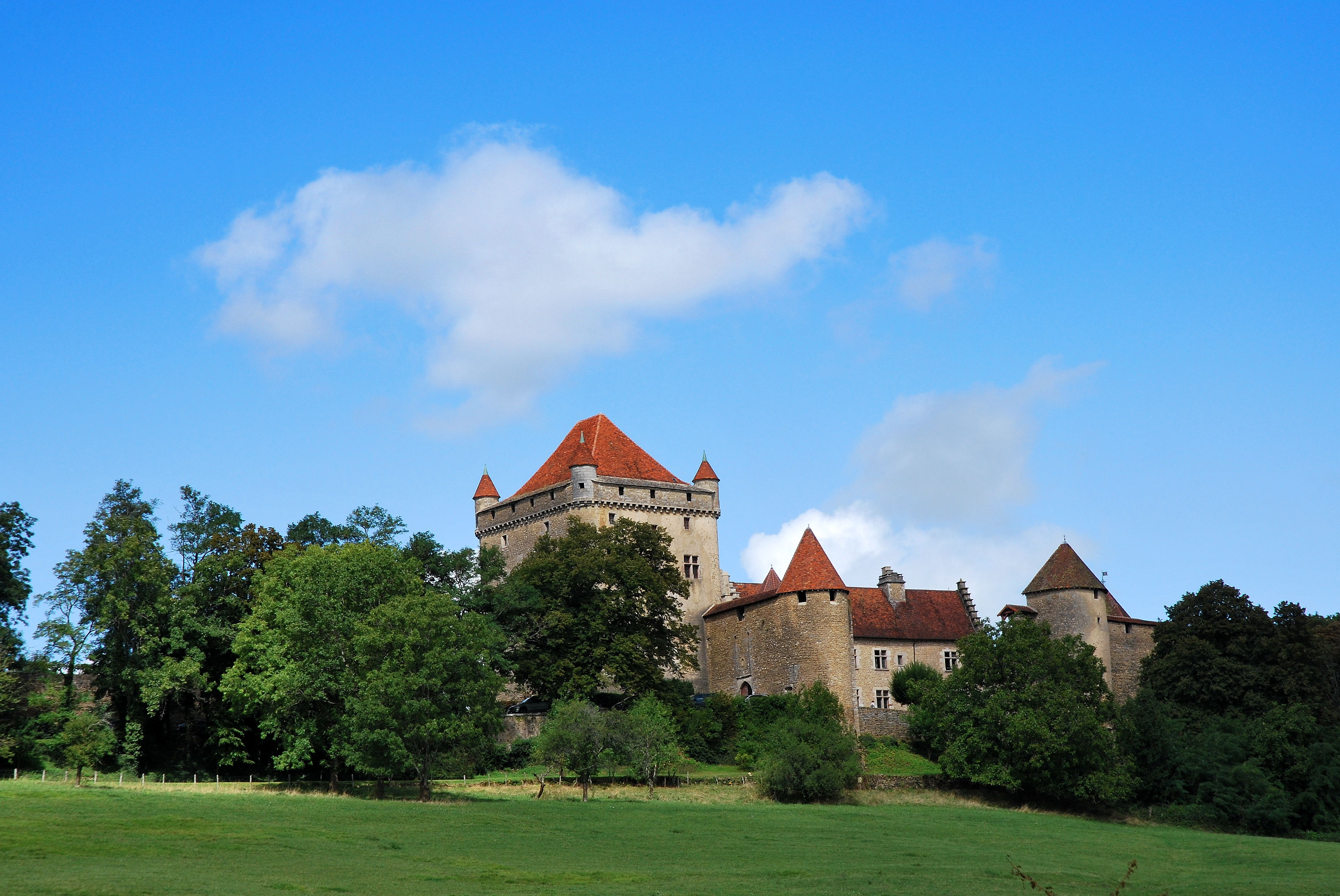
- Chateau

- Coat of arms
- Location of Le Pin
- Location within France Location within Bourgogne-Franche-Comté
- Coordinates: 46°42′33″N 5°34′14″E
- Country: France
- Region: Bourgogne-Franche-Comté
- Department: Jura
- Arrondissement: Lons-le-Saunier
- Canton: Poligny
- Intercommunality: Espace Communautaire Lons Agglomération

Government
  - Mayor (2020–2026): Christine Roy-Louvat
- Area^{1}: 2.82 km^{2} (1.09 sq mi)
- Highest elevation: 385 m (1,263 ft)
- Lowest elevation: 270 m (890 ft)
- Population (2023): 238
  - Density: 84.4/km^{2} (219/sq mi)
- Time zone: UTC+01:00 (CET)
  - Summer (DST): UTC+02:00 (CEST)
- INSEE/Postal code: 39421 /39210
- ^{1} French Land Register data, which excludes lakes, ponds, glaciers > 1 km^{2} (0.386 sq mi or 247 acres) and river estuaries.

Le Pin (French pronunciation: [lə pɛ̃]) is a commune in the Jura department in Bourgogne-Franche-Comté in eastern France.

== Population ==
Historical population
Year	Pop.	±% p.a.
1968	89	—
1975	120	+4.36%
1982	179	+5.88%
1990	256	+4.57%
1999	256	+0.00%
2007	259	+0.15%
2012	260	+0.08%
2017	241	−1.51%
2023	238	−0.21%
Source: INSEE

== See also ==
- Communes of the Jura department
