= Espace Communautaire Lons Agglomération =

- Communauté d'agglomération
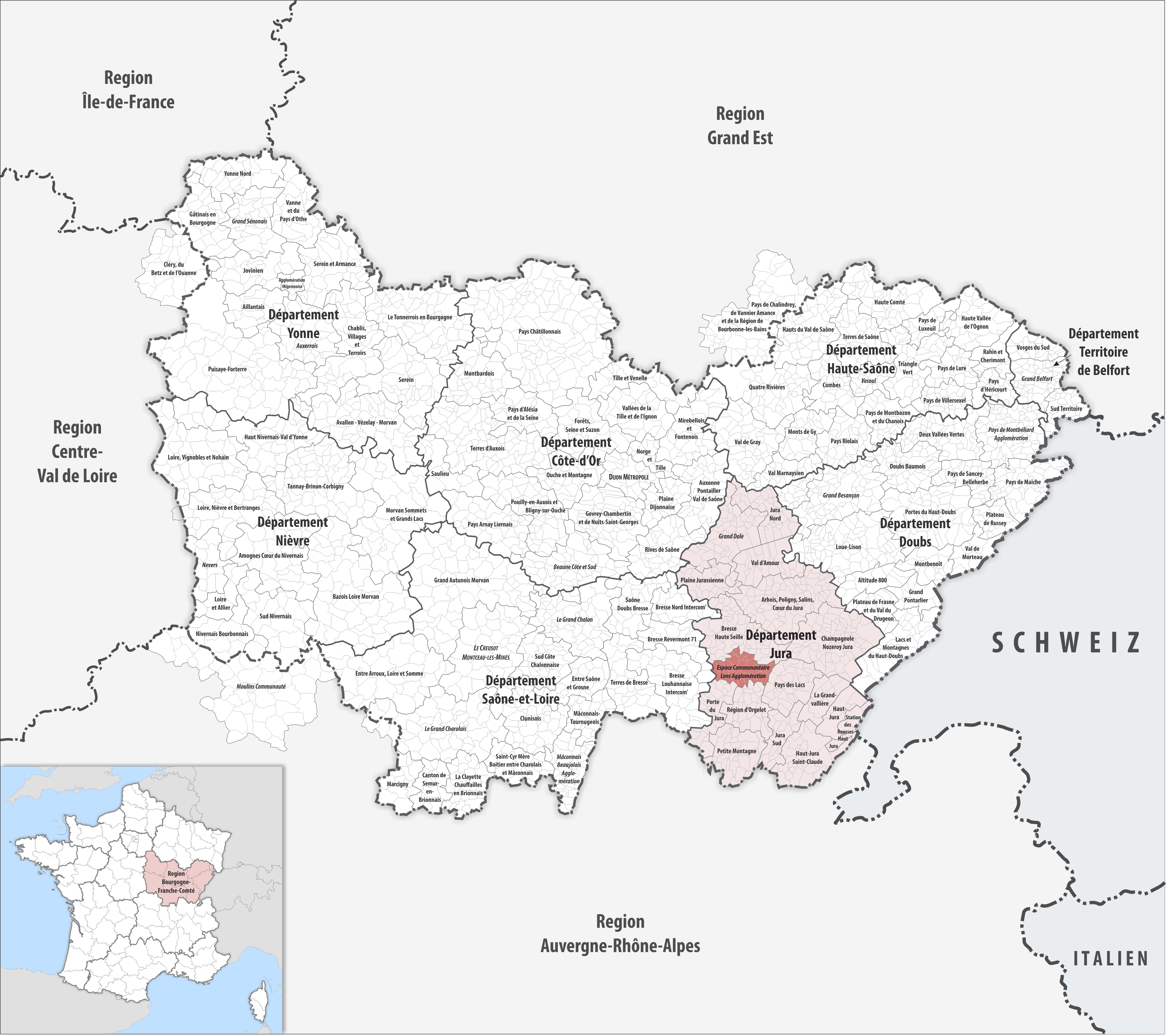
- Map dated in 2019
- Interactive map of Espace Communautaire Lons Agglomération
- Coordinates: 46°40′N 05°34′E
- Country: France
- Region: Bourgogne-Franche-Comté
- Department: Jura
- No. of communes: {{{nbcomm}}}
- Established: 2017
- Area: 196.7 km^{2} (75.9 sq mi)
- Population (2019): 34,189
  - Density: 173.8/km^{2} (450.2/sq mi)
- Website: www.ecla-jura.fr

Espace Communautaire Lons Agglomération is the communauté d'agglomération, an intercommunal structure, centred on the town of Lons-le-Saunier. It is located in the Jura department, in the Bourgogne-Franche-Comté region, eastern France. Created in 2017, its seat is in Lons-le-Saunier. Its area is 196.7 km^{2}. Its population was 34,189 in 2019, of which 17,189 in Lons-le-Saunier proper.

== Composition ==
The communauté d'agglomération consists of the following 32 communes:

1. Baume-les-Messieurs
2. Bornay
3. Briod
4. Cesancey
5. Chille
6. Chilly-le-Vignoble
7. Condamine
8. Conliège
9. Courbouzon
10. Courlans
11. Courlaoux
12. L'Étoile
13. Frébuans
14. Geruge
15. Gevingey
16. Lons-le-Saunier
17. Macornay
18. Messia-sur-Sorne
19. Moiron
20. Montaigu
21. Montmorot
22. Pannessières
23. Perrigny
24. Le Pin
25. Publy
26. Revigny
27. Saint-Didier
28. Trenal
29. Verges
30. Vernantois
31. Vevy
32. Villeneuve-sous-Pymont
