= Macornay =

Commune in Bourgogne-Franche-Comté, France

- Commune
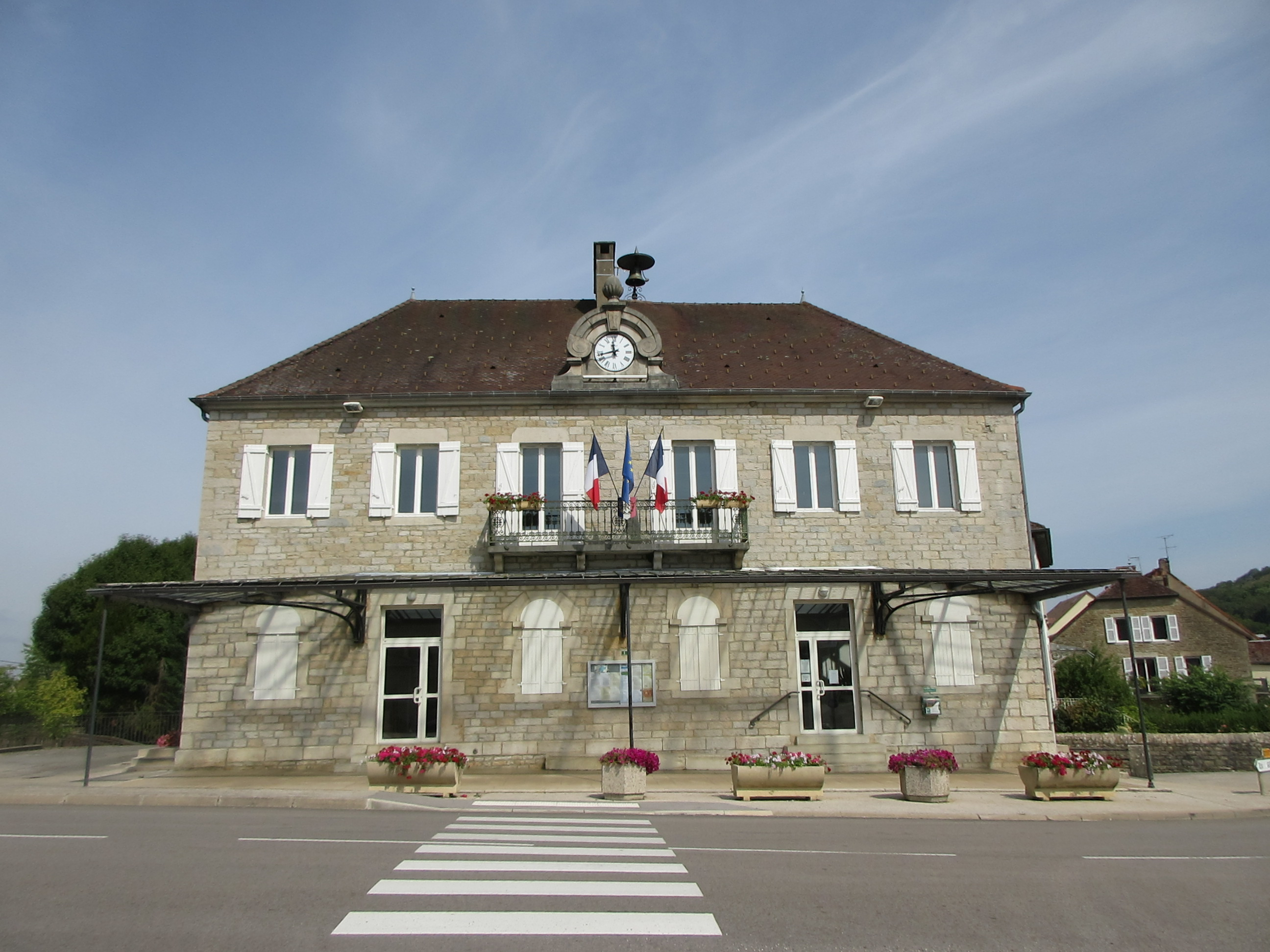
- The town hall in Macornay
- Location of Macornay
- Location within France Location within Bourgogne-Franche-Comté
- Coordinates: 46°38′44″N 5°32′32″E
- Country: France
- Region: Bourgogne-Franche-Comté
- Department: Jura
- Arrondissement: Lons-le-Saunier
- Canton: Lons-le-Saunier-2
- Intercommunality: Espace Communautaire Lons Agglomération

Government
  - Mayor (2020–2026): Michel Fischer
- Area^{1}: 4.60 km^{2} (1.78 sq mi)
- Highest elevation: 505 m (1,657 ft)
- Lowest elevation: 259 m (850 ft)
- Population (2023): 1,025
  - Density: 223/km^{2} (577/sq mi)
- Time zone: UTC+01:00 (CET)
  - Summer (DST): UTC+02:00 (CEST)
- INSEE/Postal code: 39306 /39570
- ^{1} French Land Register data, which excludes lakes, ponds, glaciers > 1 km^{2} (0.386 sq mi or 247 acres) and river estuaries.

Macornay (French pronunciation: [makɔʁnɛ]) is a commune in the Jura department in Bourgogne-Franche-Comté in eastern France. Macornay is located 4 km south of the department capital Lons-le-Saunier. Tourist attractions include many outdoor activities such as biking and hiking, and there are many historical sites in the vicinity.

== Population ==
Historical population
Year	Pop.	±% p.a.
1968	579	—
1975	550	−0.73%
1982	627	+1.89%
1990	780	+2.77%
1999	880	+1.35%
2007	1,008	+1.71%
2012	1,009	+0.02%
2017	974	−0.70%
2023	1,025	+0.85%
Source: INSEE

== See also ==
- Communes of the Jura department
