= Cesancey =

Commune in Bourgogne-Franche-Comté, France

- Commune
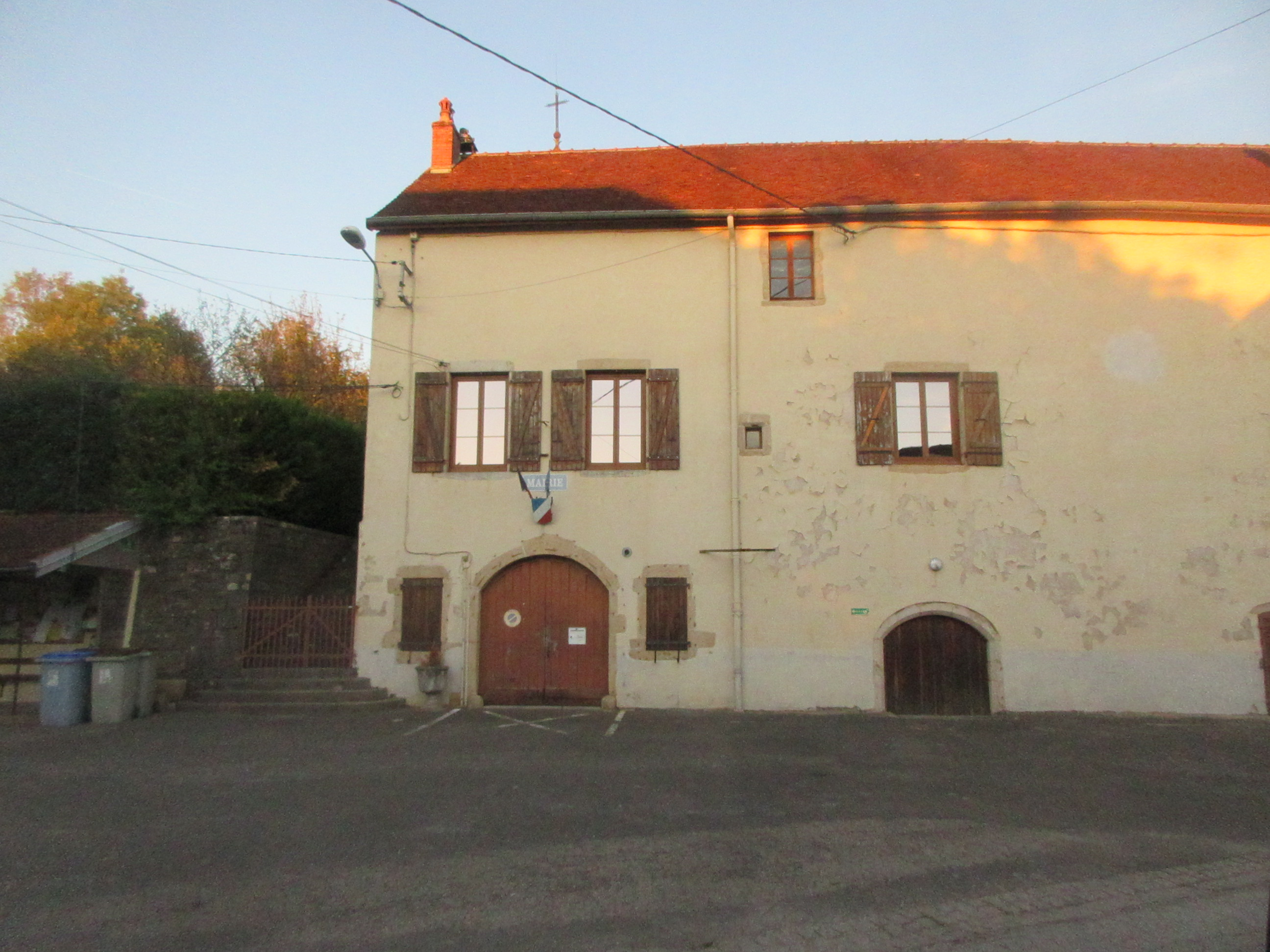
- The town hall in Cesancey
- Location of Cesancey
- Location within France Location within Bourgogne-Franche-Comté
- Coordinates: 46°37′32″N 5°29′53″E
- Country: France
- Region: Bourgogne-Franche-Comté
- Department: Jura
- Arrondissement: Lons-le-Saunier
- Canton: Saint-Amour
- Intercommunality: Espace Communautaire Lons Agglomération

Government
  - Mayor (2022–2026): Guillaume Barthe
- Area^{1}: 5.12 km^{2} (1.98 sq mi)
- Highest elevation: 450 m (1,480 ft)
- Lowest elevation: 204 m (669 ft)
- Population (2023): 389
  - Density: 76.0/km^{2} (197/sq mi)
- Time zone: UTC+01:00 (CET)
  - Summer (DST): UTC+02:00 (CEST)
- INSEE/Postal code: 39088 /39570
- ^{1} French Land Register data, which excludes lakes, ponds, glaciers > 1 km^{2} (0.386 sq mi or 247 acres) and river estuaries.

Cesancey (French pronunciation: [səzɑ̃sɛ]) is a commune in the Jura department in Bourgogne-Franche-Comté in eastern France.

== Population ==
Historical population
Year	Pop.	±% p.a.
1968	255	—
1975	252	−0.17%
1982	315	+3.24%
1990	312	−0.12%
1999	334	+0.76%
2007	396	+2.15%
2012	405	+0.45%
2017	392	−0.65%
2023	389	−0.13%
Source: INSEE

== See also ==
- Communes of the Jura department
