= Courbouzon, Jura =

Commune in Bourgogne-Franche-Comté, France

Courbouzon
- Commune
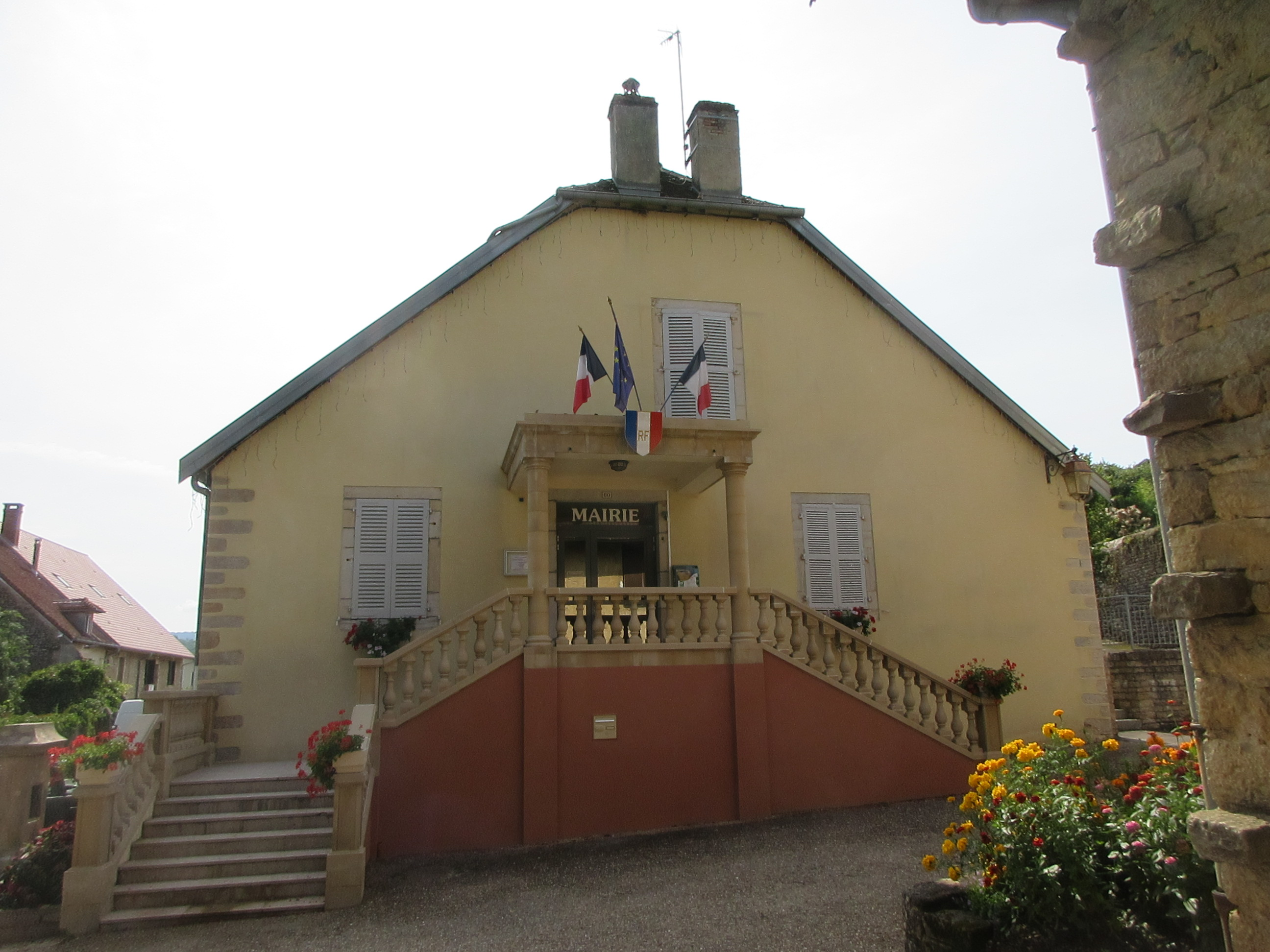
- The town hall in Courbouzon

- Coat of arms
- Location of Courbouzon
- Location within France Location within Bourgogne-Franche-Comté
- Coordinates: 46°39′07″N 5°31′45″E
- Country: France
- Region: Bourgogne-Franche-Comté
- Department: Jura
- Arrondissement: Lons-le-Saunier
- Canton: Lons-le-Saunier-2
- Intercommunality: Espace Communautaire Lons Agglomération

Government
  - Mayor (2020–2026): Pierre Poulet
- Area^{1}: 3.35 km^{2} (1.29 sq mi)
- Highest elevation: 460 m (1,510 ft)
- Lowest elevation: 245 m (804 ft)
- Population (2023): 579
  - Density: 173/km^{2} (448/sq mi)
- Time zone: UTC+01:00 (CET)
  - Summer (DST): UTC+02:00 (CEST)
- INSEE/Postal code: 39169 /39570
- ^{1} French Land Register data, which excludes lakes, ponds, glaciers > 1 km^{2} (0.386 sq mi or 247 acres) and river estuaries.

Courbouzon (French pronunciation: [kuʁbuzɔ̃]) is a commune in the Jura department in Bourgogne-Franche-Comté in eastern France.

== Population ==
Historical population
Year	Pop.	±% p.a.
1968	526	—
1975	547	+0.56%
1982	578	+0.79%
1990	528	−1.12%
1999	566	+0.78%
2007	594	+0.61%
2012	585	−0.30%
2017	590	+0.17%
2023	579	−0.31%
Source: INSEE

== See also ==
- Communes of the Jura department
