= Chilly-le-Vignoble =

Commune in Bourgogne-Franche-Comté, France

- Commune
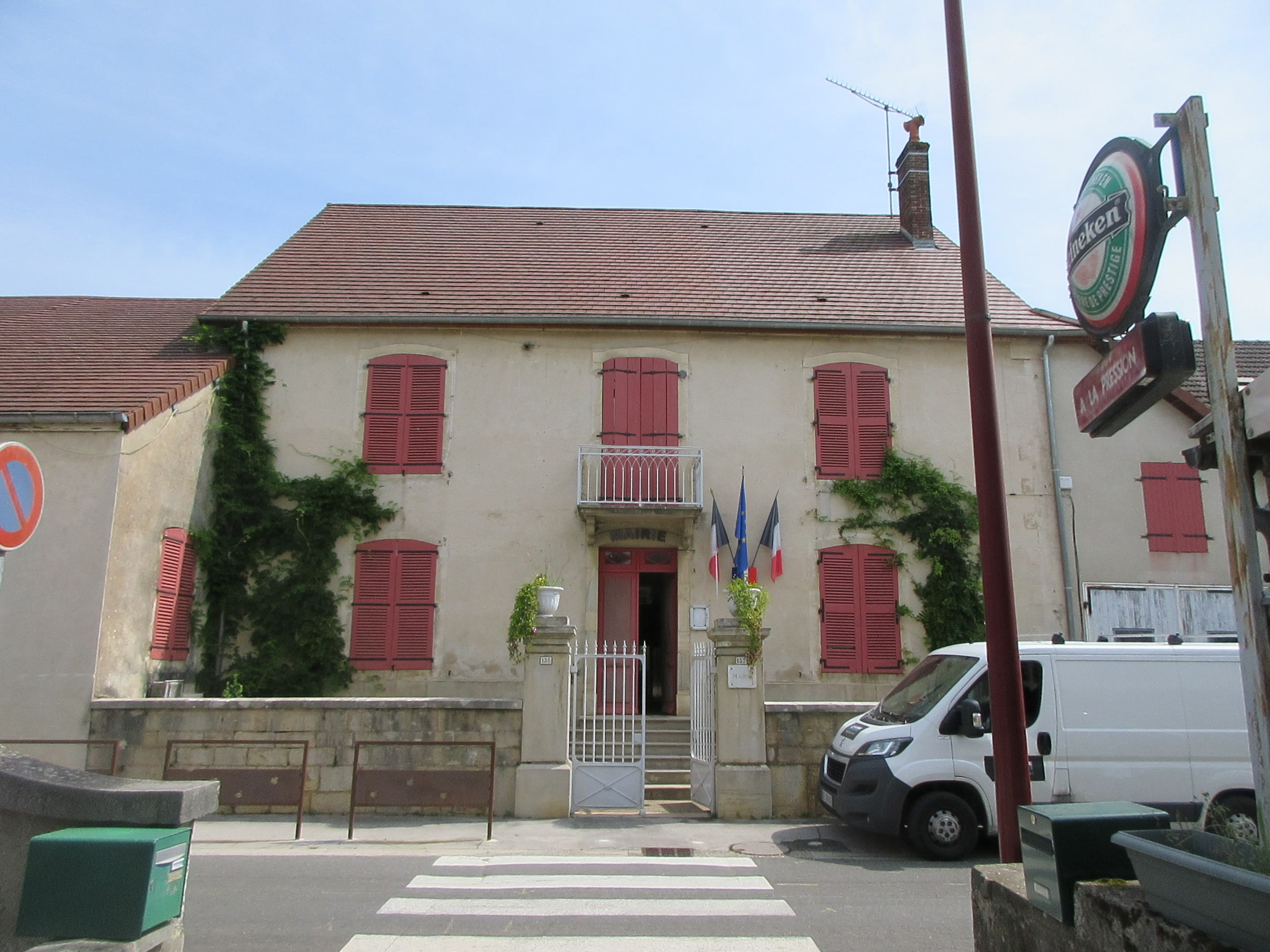
- The town hall in Chilly-le-Vignoble
- Location of Chilly-le-Vignoble
- Location within France Location within Bourgogne-Franche-Comté
- Coordinates: 46°39′30″N 5°30′02″E
- Country: France
- Region: Bourgogne-Franche-Comté
- Department: Jura
- Arrondissement: Lons-le-Saunier
- Canton: Lons-le-Saunier-2
- Intercommunality: Espace Communautaire Lons Agglomération

Government
  - Mayor (2020–2026): Dominique Billot
- Area^{1}: 3.07 km^{2} (1.19 sq mi)
- Highest elevation: 287 m (942 ft)
- Lowest elevation: 212 m (696 ft)
- Population (2023): 598
  - Density: 195/km^{2} (504/sq mi)
- Time zone: UTC+01:00 (CET)
  - Summer (DST): UTC+02:00 (CEST)
- INSEE/Postal code: 39146 /39570
- ^{1} French Land Register data, which excludes lakes, ponds, glaciers > 1 km^{2} (0.386 sq mi or 247 acres) and river estuaries.

Chilly-le-Vignoble (French pronunciation: [ʃiji lə viɲɔbl]) is a commune in the Jura department in Bourgogne-Franche-Comté in eastern France.

== Population ==
Historical population
Year	Pop.	±% p.a.
1968	350	—
1975	396	+1.78%
1982	385	−0.40%
1990	375	−0.33%
1999	390	+0.44%
2007	495	+3.02%
2012	645	+5.44%
2017	667	+0.67%
2023	598	−1.80%
Source: INSEE

== See also ==
- Communes of the Jura department
