= Burrus (disambiguation) =

Burrus is a genus of shield bugs in the tribe Podopini.

Burrus may also refer to:

== Places ==
- Château Burrus is a château in the department of Haut-Rhin, Alsace, France
- Hollywood, also known as The Burrus House, is a building near Benoit, Mississippi

== People ==
- Charles Sidney Burrus, is an American electrical engineer
- Daniel Burrus, is an American futurist, business advisor, author, and frequent speaker about business strategy and innovation
- Dick Burrus or Maurice Lennon "Dick" Burrus, was a professional baseball player
- Dixie Burrus Browning, née Burrus, is an American artist and writer of over 100 romance novels
- Ernest J. Burrus, was a Jesuit and a leading historian of northwestern New Spain, particularly the Baja California peninsula and Sonora
- James Dallas Burrus, was an African-American educator, druggist and philanthropist
- Kevin Omni Burrus, was the assistant director for the documentary "How Do I Look NYC," produced by Wolfgang Busch
- Lucius Antistius Burrus Adventus (died 188) was a Roman Senator that lived in the 2nd century
- Mary Burrus Williams, is the co-author with her sister, Dixie Burrus Browning, of historical novels under the pen name Bronwyn Williams
- Maurice Jean Marie Burrus, was an Alsatian tobacco magnate, politician and philatelist
- Sextus Afranius Burrus, was a prefect of the Praetorian Guard
- Terrance Corley Burrus, is an American keyboardist, composer, record producer, conductor, business, realty and fashion designer executive

== Other ==
- Western trumpeter whiting, Sillago burrus, is a species of marine fish of the smelt whiting family Sillaginidae
