= Free Imperial City of Besançon =

Former administrative territorial entity, independence in 1654

Coordinates: 47.24°N 6.03°E

Free Imperial City of Besançon Freie Reichsstadt Bisanz (German)
- 1184–1654
- Coat of arms
- Status: Free imperial city
- Capital: Besançon
- Common languages: Frainc-Comtou
- Government: Democratic republic
- Historical era: Middle Ages, Early modern
  - Established: 1184
  - Disestablished: 1654
Preceded by	Succeeded by
County of Burgundy	Free City of Besançon
- Today part of: France

The Free Imperial City of Besançon was a self-governing free imperial city that was part of the Holy Roman Empire. Its capital was Besançon.

From 1184 until 1654 the city of Besançon was a free imperial city (German: Freie Reichsstadt) as shown by the coat of arms until today and called Bisanz. The city was first separated from the governance of the County of Burgundy in 1034 as a prince-bishopric, an ecclesiastical state in the Holy Roman Empire. The city was governed by the Prince-Archbishopric of Besançon, although later most of his power would devolve to a council within the town. The free imperial city enclosed only the city of Besançon in the Franche-Comté so for a large part of the time it was controlled those who controlled access across the surrounding land, first by the dukes of Burgundy, and then by the Habsburgs. Finally, it lost its imperial status but remained a free city.

== History ==
=== Gaining independence ===
Besançon became part of the Holy Roman Empire in 1034, along with the rest of Franche-Comté.

In 1184, the city became the Archbishopric of Besançon, gaining autonomy as an imperial free city under the Holy Roman Emperor. The archbishop of Besançon was elevated to prince of the Holy Roman Empire in 1288. Previous bishops, such as St Hugh I, had been referred to as princes of the Empire. The close connection to the Empire is reflected in the city's coat of arms.

In 1290, after a century of fighting against the power of the archbishops, the emperor recognised Besançon's independence.

In August 1336, the duke of Burgundy tried to take Besançon after a dispute with the clergy of Franche-Comté. The duke sent 9,000 soldiers who set up camp at Saint-Ferjeux, near Planoise. The duke abandoned the siege after a few months.

The town fell into a number of disputes with its archbishop and sought the aid of a number of outside protectors, or captains, such as Philip the Good. In the fifteenth century, Besançon came under the influence of the dukes of Burgundy, although it never recognised their sovereignty.

=== Habsburg control ===
After the marriage of Mary of Burgundy to Maximilian I, Holy Roman Emperor in 1477, the city was in effect a Habsburg fief. In 1519, Charles V, King of Spain, became the Holy Roman Emperor. This made him master of Franche-Comté and Besançon, by then a francophone German city. Besançon treated the Habsburgs as their protectors in the same way they had previously treated the dukes of Burgundy.

In 1526, the city obtained the right to mint coins, which it continued to strike until 1673. Nevertheless, all coins bore the name of Charles V.

When Charles V abdicated in 1555, he gave Franche-Comté to his son, Philip II, King of Spain. Besançon remained a free imperial city under the protection of the king of Spain. In 1575, following the death of Charles IX of France, Huguenots attempted to capture Besançon in order to make it a stronghold, which meant that the city had to accept a Spanish garrison for protection - an important decline in its independent status.

In 1598, Philip II gave the province to his daughter on her marriage to an Austrian archduke. It remained formally a portion of the Empire until its cession from Austria to Spain, along with Franche-Comté, in the peace of Westphalia in 1648. The city lost its status as a free city in 1651 as a reparation for other losses that the Spanish had suffered in the Thirty Years' War. After some resistance this was finally confirmed by Besançon in 1654, although Besançon kept a high degree of internal autonomy.

=== Disputes with France ===
In 1667, Louis XIV claimed Franche-Comté as a consequence of his marriage to Maria Theresa of Spain. As part of the War of Devolution French troops arrived in the area in 1668. Besançon tried to argue that it was neutral in any hostilities as it was a Free Imperial City of the Holy Roman Empire, something that the French commander the Prince de Conde rejected as archaic. The French agreed to very generous surrender terms with the town authorities which included transferring the university from the then still recalcitrant Dole. There were also rumours that the regional Parlement may be transferred from Dole. The City also laid down that they would be left the relic of a fragment of the holy winding sheet and that Protestants should not have liberty of conscience in the same way as they then had in the rest of France.

While it was in French hands, the famed military engineer Vauban visited the city and drew up plans for its fortification. The Treaty of Aix-la-Chapelle returned it to Spain within a matter of months in return for the town of Frankenthal.

The Spaniards built the main centre point of the city's defences, "la Citadelle", siting it on Mont St. Etienne, which closes the neck of the bend in the river that encloses the old city. In their construction, they followed Vauban's designs.

From this time onwards a large pro-French faction grew among some of the town.

=== Surrender to the French ===
The City was to finally lose its autonomy as a result of the Franco-Dutch War starting in 1672, where the Habsburgs took the side of the Dutch and so were to lose control of Franche-Comté and Besançon. After a siege of the city, French troops occupied the city in 1674, although agreeing to allow Besançon to keep her privileges.

In 1676, the French authorities wound up the magistracy, the democratic form of government of Besançon. A baillarge court was set up in its stead. As part of the deal the city became the administrative centre for Franche-Comté, with the Parlement of Besançon administering the area, replacing the Parlement of Dole. French control was confirmed in 1678 by the Treaty of Nijmegen.

== Institutions ==
Besançon had a reasonably democratic form of government, unlike most free imperial cities, which gradually became oligarchies. The government consisted of twenty-eight councillors elected every year by the seven parishes. These, in turn, chose fourteen governors, who dealt with the day-to-day business. The main business was dealt with by both councillors and governors sitting together. There was also a provision for a general assembly of citizens in very important cases.

The protector, first the dukes of Burgundy and then the Austrian and Spanish Habsburgs had the right to appoint a president for the governors and the commander of the soldiers who guarded the ramparts. These were never recognised as sovereign, although they still claimed to be a free city.
