= Hôtel de Ville, Dole =

Town hall in Dole, France

Hôtel de Ville
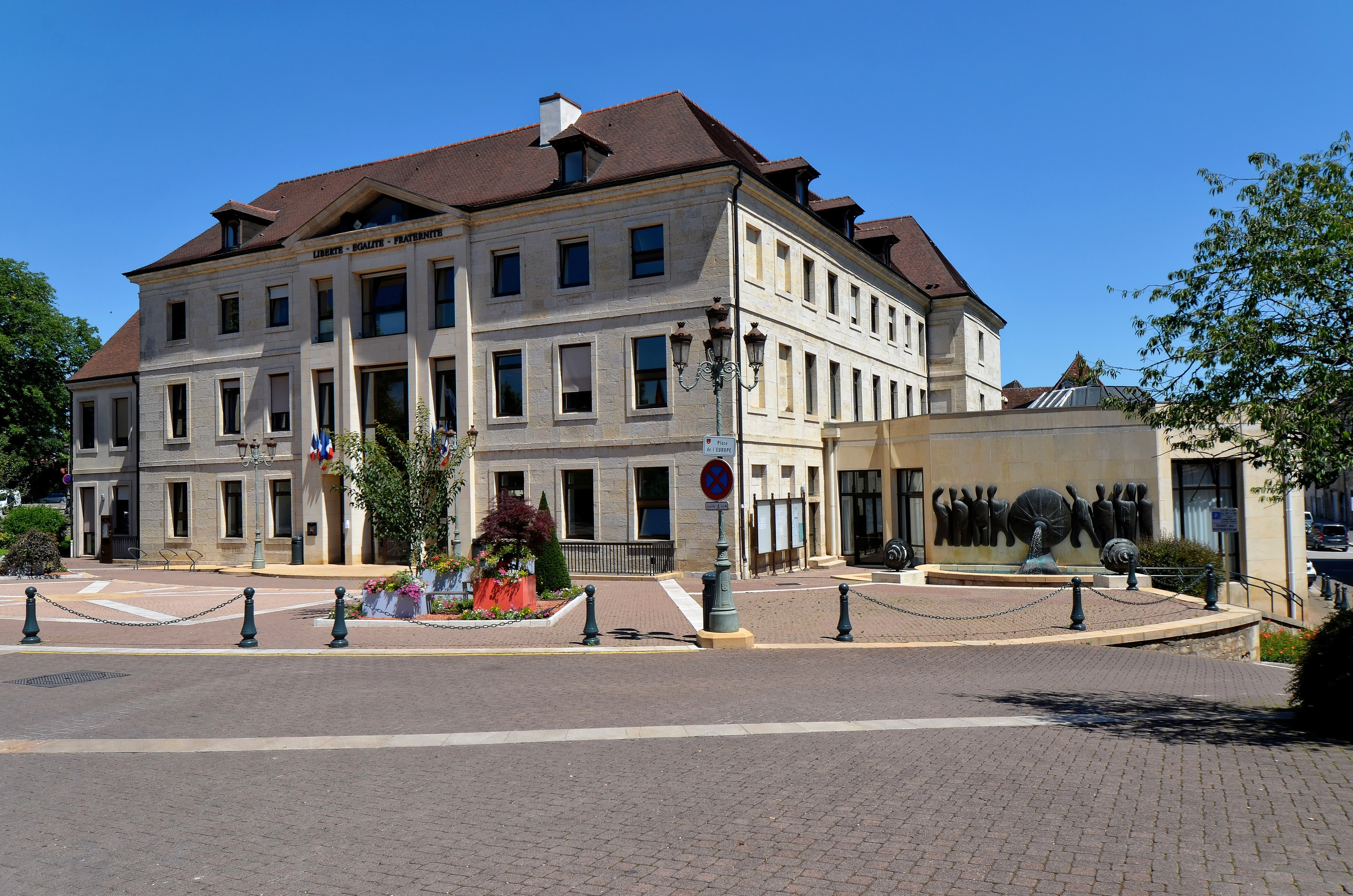
- The main frontage of the Hôtel de Ville in June 2019
- Interactive map of the Hôtel de Ville area

General information
- Type: City hall
- Architectural style: Neoclassical style
- Location: Dole, France
- Coordinates: 47.0909°N 5.4892°E
- Completed: 1988

Design and construction
- Architect: Roger Longchamp

The Hôtel de Ville (French pronunciation: [otɛl də vil], City Hall) is a municipal building in Dole, Jura, in eastern France, standing on Place de l'Europe.

== History ==
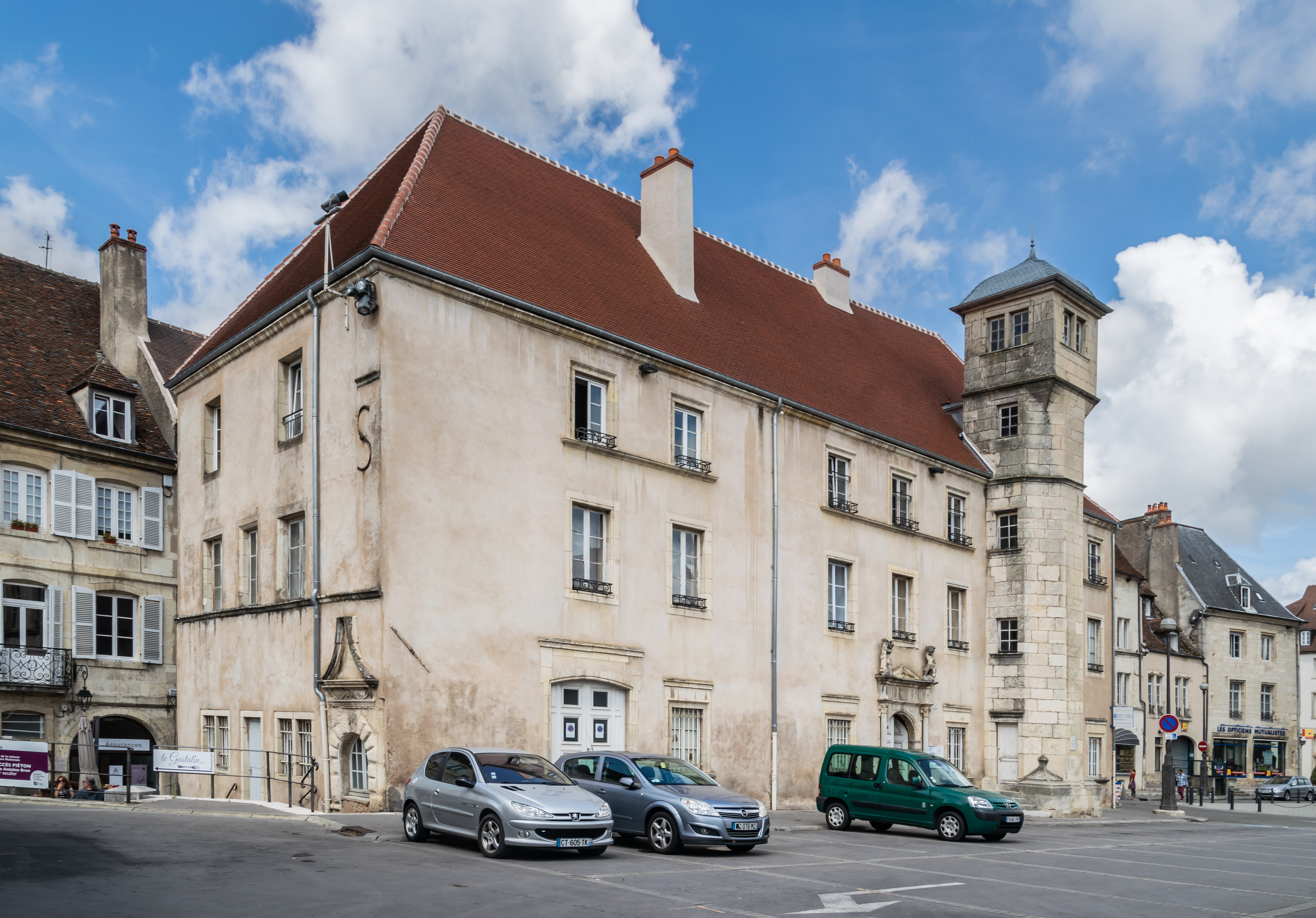
The old town hall on Place Nationale

The consuls established their first meeting place in the Tour de Vergy, also known as the Tour de Chamblanc, in the 15th century. The tower was one of only three buildings left standing after the siege of Dole by the troops of Louis XI in April 1479 during the War of the Burgundian Succession. They then moved to a building on Rue des Arènes (now Rue Cordière) in 1609 and, after Louis XIV moved the Parlement of the County of Burgundy to Besançon in 1676, the consuls moved into the former parlement building in 1696.

In 1880, the town council decided to relocate into a large building on the northwest side of Place Nationale, close to the Collegiate Church of Notre-Dame. The design involved an asymmetrical main frontage of seven bays facing onto the square. The fourth bay on the left featured a round-headed doorway flanked by a pair of columns supporting an entablature, a pediment and two putti, while the space between the fifth and sixth bays featured a stair turret which dated from the 16th century. After the building was no longer required for municipal use, it became the offices of the Mission Locale Dole Revermont, which supports young people in their careers. A major programme of works to repair the roof was completed in 2017.

In the mid-1950s, the council decided to move to a more substantial building. The building they selected was the Villa Audemar on the corner of Boulevard Wilson and Avenue Aristide-Briand. The building had been commissioned by a local ironmaster, Camille Audemar. It was designed in the neoclassical style, built in ashlar stone and had been completed in 1922. The design involved a main frontage of a single bay facing the corner of the two streets. It featured a segmental-headed doorway with voussoirs on the ground floor, a Venetian window on the first floor and a bi-partite dormer window at roof level. The side elevations, along the two streets, were fenestrated in a similar style. After the building was no longer required for municipal use, it became the conservatory.

In the mid-1980s, following significant population growth, the council led by the mayor, Gilbert Barbier, again decided to relocate to a more substantial building. The site they selected was a former prison on what is now Place de l'Europe. The building had originally been commissioned as the Maison du Bon Pasteur (House of the Good Shepherd) in 1776. It had been designed in the neoclassical style, built in stone and completed in 1783. The three-storey building was built round a courtyard and was converted for prison use in 1927. After it was no longer required for custodial use, it was acquired by the Ministry of National Education in 1959 and made available to the local technical school as a training centre. Following the opening of the Lycée technique des Mesnils Pasteur in 1967, the building became vacant and it was acquired by the council in 1977. After being remodelled for municipal use to a design by Roger Longchamp, it reopened in 1988.

The remodelling involved the demolition of the walls and the creation of two new wings at a cost FFr 30 million. The design involved a symmetrical main frontage of nine bays facing onto Place de l'Europe. The central section of three bays, which was slightly projected forward, featured a double height glass entrance on the ground floor with a square casement window on the second floor. The outer bays of the central section were fenestrated by lancet windows on all three floors and there was a pediment above. The other bays were fenestrated by casement windows. Internally, the prison courtyard became a central hall with a glass roof. The principal room in the complex was the Salle Edgar Faure, which was contained in a separate octagonal structure on the southeastern side of the main building: it was decorated on the outside with artwork by the sculptor, Bernard Paul, and named after the former Prime Minister of France, Edgar Faure, who represented Jura in the National Assembly under the Fourth Republic.
