= Hugues Sambin =

French sculptor

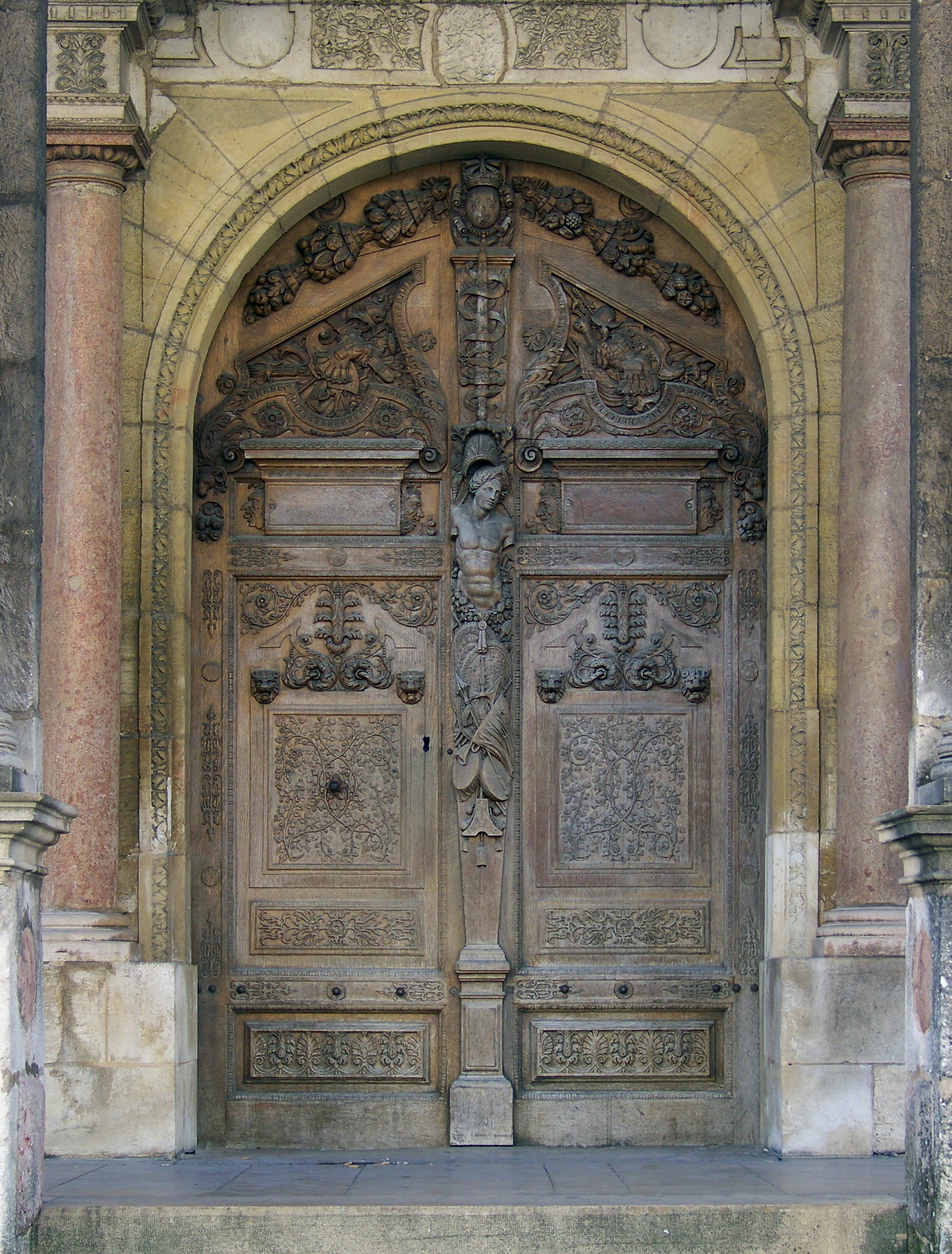
Main door of the Parliament of Burgundy (currently law courts) in Dijon, door sculpted by Hugues Sambin, 1580

Hugues Sambin (French pronunciation: [yɡ sɑ̃bɛ̃]; ca. 1520–1601) was a Franc-comtois sculptor, trained as a menuisier or wood-worker; as a designer of Mannerist ornaments, his published designs, such as Oevvre de la diversite des termes, dont on use en architecture, reduicts en ordres, Lyon, 1572, inspired luxury furnishings, such as dressoires, armoires and cabinets. Its preface was signed "Hugues Sambin, Architecteur en la ville de Dijon".

As an architect, Sambin worked on the designs for temporary festive structures for the Royal Entry into Dijon of Henri II and that of Charles IX (1564), for which Sambin was coordinator; in more lasting commissions, he built the Parlement of Besançon and the structure that is palais de Justice at Dijon, built to house the Parlement of Burgundy (1572). Archival references have recently revealed that he had spent six months in 1544 working at the Palace of Fontainebleau, where the French Mannerist style was being rapidly evolved and perfected among the painters and stucco-workers and engravers of the School of Fontainebleau.

The somewhat hectic and overcharged style of Hugues Sambin was one of the models employed in Renaissance Revival architecture of the second half of the nineteenth century.

An exhibition at the Musée National de la Renaissance, Château d'Écouen, October 2001 – January 2002, and the catalogue, Hugues Sambin: Un Créateur au XVIe siècle (vers 1520-1601) (Alain Erlande-Brandenburg, curator) revived interest in the craftsman-designer, who was trained as a menuisier.
