= Perrigny, Jura =

Commune in Bourgogne-Franche-Comté, France

Perrigny
- Commune
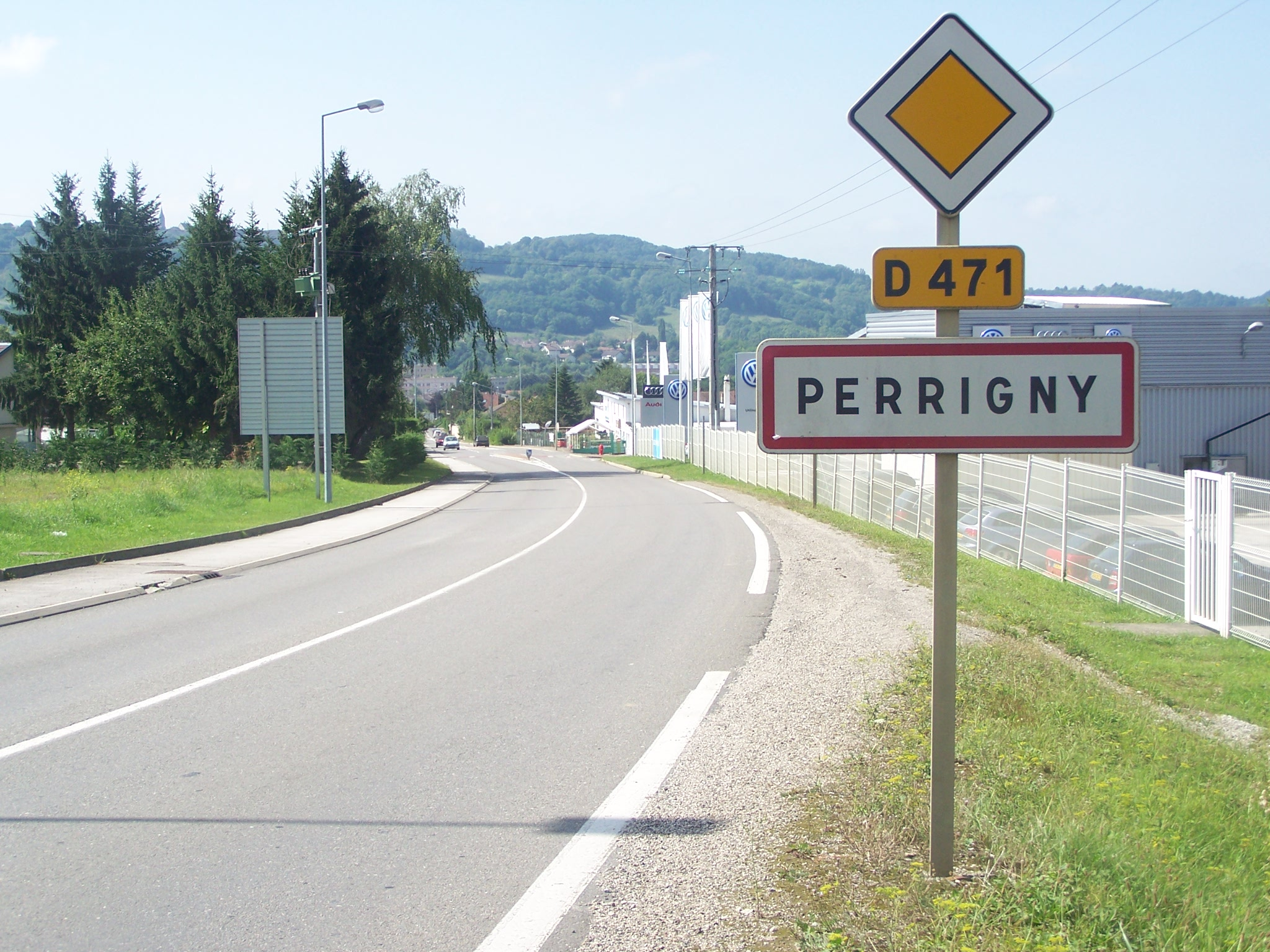
- The road into Perrigny

- Coat of arms
- Location of Perrigny
- Location within France Location within Bourgogne-Franche-Comté
- Coordinates: 46°40′10″N 5°35′10″E
- Country: France
- Region: Bourgogne-Franche-Comté
- Department: Jura
- Arrondissement: Lons-le-Saunier
- Canton: Poligny
- Intercommunality: Espace Communautaire Lons Agglomération

Government
  - Mayor (2025–2026): André Perrier
- Area^{1}: 8.89 km^{2} (3.43 sq mi)
- Highest elevation: 564 m (1,850 ft)
- Lowest elevation: 271 m (889 ft)
- Population (2023): 1,551
  - Density: 174/km^{2} (452/sq mi)
- Time zone: UTC+01:00 (CET)
  - Summer (DST): UTC+02:00 (CEST)
- INSEE/Postal code: 39411 /39570
- ^{1} French Land Register data, which excludes lakes, ponds, glaciers > 1 km^{2} (0.386 sq mi or 247 acres) and river estuaries.

Perrigny (French pronunciation: [pɛʁiɲi]) is a commune in the Jura department in Bourgogne-Franche-Comté in eastern France. Perrigny is an eastern suburb of Lons-le-Saunier. The Vallière forms most of the commune's south-western border.

The parish church of Saint-Jean-Baptiste is on high ground on the eastern edge of the village, giving panoramic views over the commune.

== Population ==
Historical population
| Year | Pop. | ±% p.a. |
|---|---|---|
| 1968 | 1,322 | — |
| 1975 | 1,645 | +3.17% |
| 1982 | 1,619 | −0.23% |
| 1990 | 1,580 | −0.30% |
| 1999 | 1,646 | +0.46% |
| 2007 | 1,543 | −0.80% |
| 2012 | 1,536 | −0.09% |
| 2017 | 1,523 | −0.17% |
| 2023 | 1,551 | +0.30% |
Source: INSEE

== Notable people ==
- Jean Grivel (died 1624), lord of Perrigny
- Jean-François Stévenin, actor, lived in Perrigny in his youth.

== See also ==
- Communes of the Jura department
