= Jean Grivel =

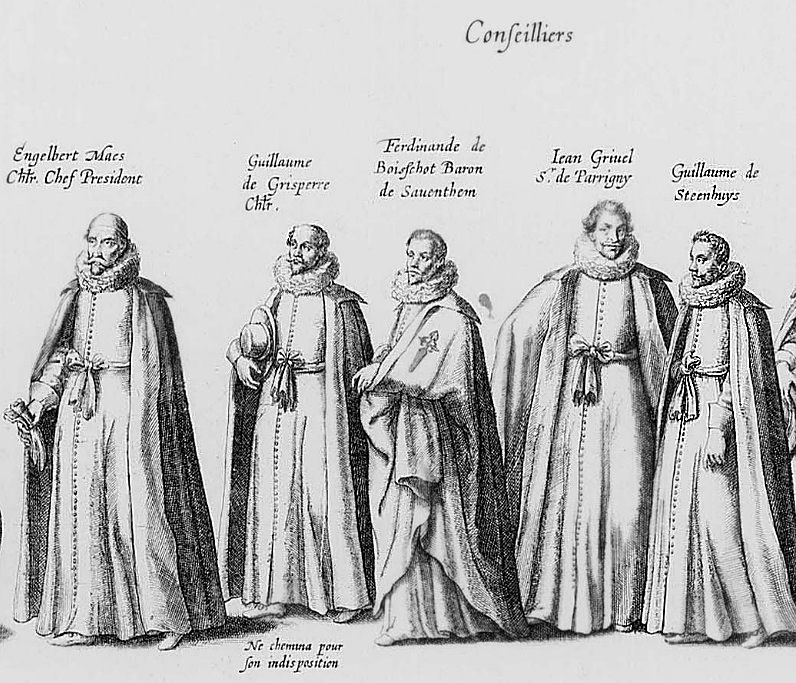
- Privy Councillors in the funeral cortege of Archduke Albert (1622); Grivel second from right
- Born: 15 March 1560; Lons-le-Saunier
- Died: 14 October 1624 (aged 64); Brussels
- Burial place: Church of St Géry
- Education: University of Dole
- Spouse: Jeanne Tricornet
- Children: Claude; Albert; Ferdinand
- Parents: Christophe Grivel (father); Adrienne de Pariset (mother)

Jean Grivel, lord of Perrigny (1560–1624) was a jurist from the County of Burgundy, which was then part of the Spanish monarchy and the Holy Roman Empire.

== Life ==
Grivel was born in Lons-le-Saunier, on 15 March 1560, to Christophe Grivel and Adrienne de Pariset. He studied law at the University of Dole and married Jeanne Tricornet. He took part in resisting the 1595 French invasion of Franche-Comté, and his journal of the conflict was published in 1865. On 21 March 1599 he was appointed a councillor in the Parlement of Dole, and on 11 January 1608 councillor and master of requests of the Brussels Privy Council. His volume of judicial decisions of the Parlement, first published in 1618, was reprinted in 1623, 1631, 1660, 1663 and 1731. He died in Brussels on 14 October 1624 and was buried in the Church of St Géry. He was survived by three sons: Claude, who followed in his footsteps as a judge; Albert, who became prior of St Désiré in Lons-le-Saunier; and Ferdinand, who served as a cavalry commander in the Eighty Years War.

== Works ==
- Decisiones celeberrimi sequanorum Senatus Dolani (Antwerp, Jan van Keerbergen, 1618)
- Journal de Jean Grivel, Seigneur de Perrigny, edited by Achille Chereau (Lons-le-Saunier, 1865)
