= Maurice Burrus =

Alsatian tobacco magnate, politician and philatelist

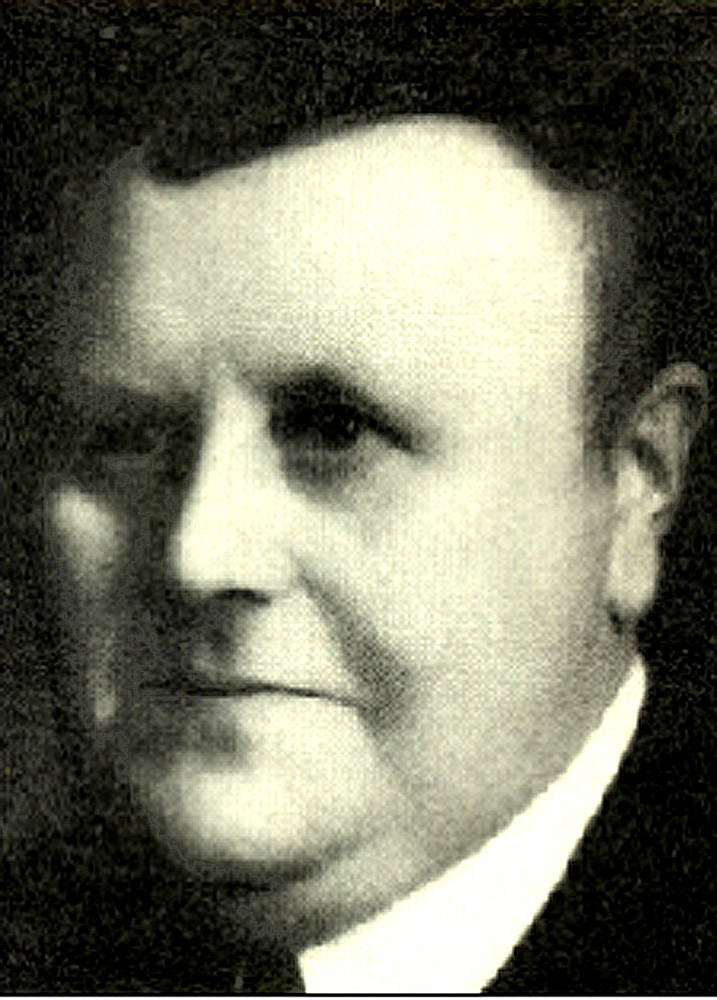
- Born: Maurice Jean Marie Burrus; March 8, 1882; Sainte-Croix-aux-Mines
- Died: December 5, 1959 (aged 77); Lausanne
- Occupation: Tobacco magnate
- Known for: Stamp collection

Maurice Jean Marie Burrus (8 March 1882 – 5 December 1959) was an Alsatian tobacco magnate, politician and philatelist. Originally from Alsace but residing in Switzerland, he was a deputy in the French parliament during the 1930s. His stamp collection was considered one of the greatest ever assembled and included some of the world's rarest stamps.

== Early life ==
Maurice Burrus was born in Sainte-Croix-aux-Mines on March 8, 1882, to a family of tobacco industrialists. The family was based in the Alsace area, where they owned a chateau named after themselves. The family moved to Switzerland after the French government created a monopoly on the manufacture of tobacco products under Napoleonic laws.

He was educated at Dole, in the Collège Stanislas de Paris and later in Hanover where he studied banking and learnt German before returning to Sainte-Croix-aux-Mines where he took over the running of the family tobacco factory. He also travelled to the United States, Canada, Mexico and Asia Minor.

== Later life ==
During World War I his anti-German sentiment was displayed by refusing to supply the German armies with tobacco, an act that got him a prison sentence of eight months and exiled from Alsace where his property was seized and sold. For this he received the French Médaille de la Fidélité. He was also awarded the Croix de guerre and the Médaille des Proscrits d'Alsace (Exiles from Alsace medal). He died in Lausanne in 1959.

== Politics ==
Between 1932 and 1942, Burrus was a Deputy for Haut-Rhin in the French Parliament of the French Third Republic, first as an independent left party member until 1936 and then with the Independents of Popular Action.

== Philately ==
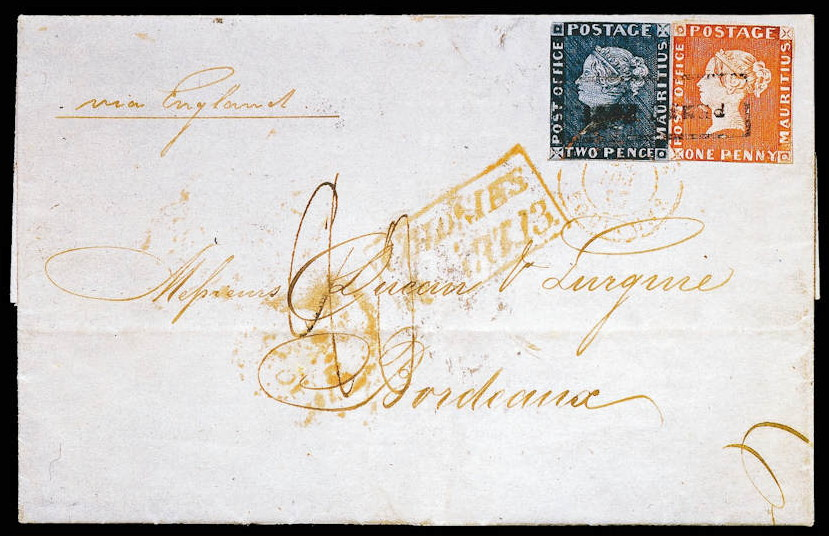
The "Bordeaux Cover", bought in 1934 by Burrus at the Hind auction, with Mauritius 1d Orange-red and the 2d Deep Blue "Post Office" stamps. Auctioned for CHF 5,750,000 in 1993 by David Feldman.

Burrus began to collect stamps at the age of seven after old family mail found in their attics spurred his interest.

In collecting, Burrus was a completist and he had the funds to allow him to be so. In a 1922 issue of The Philatelic Magazine he suggested that a collector's aim was:

to reassemble the whole of the stamps issued in one country, in a certain part of the world, or if possible, of the whole universe, and not to estimate the value of stamps according to their beauty of engraving or design.

He owned some of the rarest and most expensive stamps known, such as the 1886 Dominican 6 pence Queen Victoria stamp with a "one penny" overprint error and an 1851 New Carlisle Postmaster's Provisional on cover that sold in 2010 for €280,000. In 1923 he acquired the only complete known unused sheet of 20 of the 1850 “Dreier Sachsen” (Saxony) stamps previously in the collection of Philipp von Ferrary and sold it prior to the rest of his collection being sold around 1964. Burrus had acquired about a quarter of Ferrary's collection. By the time of his death in 1959, he owned five copies of the Mauritius "Post Office" stamp.

=== Accolades ===
Burrus was a member of the Académie de philatélie for more than 30 years and in 1955 he was invited to sign the Roll of Distinguished Philatelists. In the same year Life magazine wrote that in their opinion, he had one of the three "truly great stamp collections worldwide in scope". He was commemorated in 1968 by the Liechtenstein post office when he was one of five notable collectors included on a set of stamps issued that year.

=== Disposal of collections ===
The Burrus collection was connected to the Ponzi scheme run by Dr Paul Singer, manager of the Irish-based Shanahan Stamp Auctions that existed in the 1950s, one of the greatest scandals in philately. In 1959 Singer negotiated the purchase of the Burrus collection for $6,000,000, to be paid in several instalments and the first portion was purchased for a price above its accepted valuation. A robbery at the firm's premises took place the night before the first scheduled auction of Burrus stamps but the thieves only stole other materials and a small portion of the stamps were retrieved the following day. The robbery led to the exposure of the Ponzi scheme, several lawsuits, and the liquidation of Shanahans. The liquidator contracted Robson Lowe to dispose of the Burrus material between 1962 and 1964.
