= Sainte-Croix-aux-Mines =

Commune in Grand Est, France

- Commune
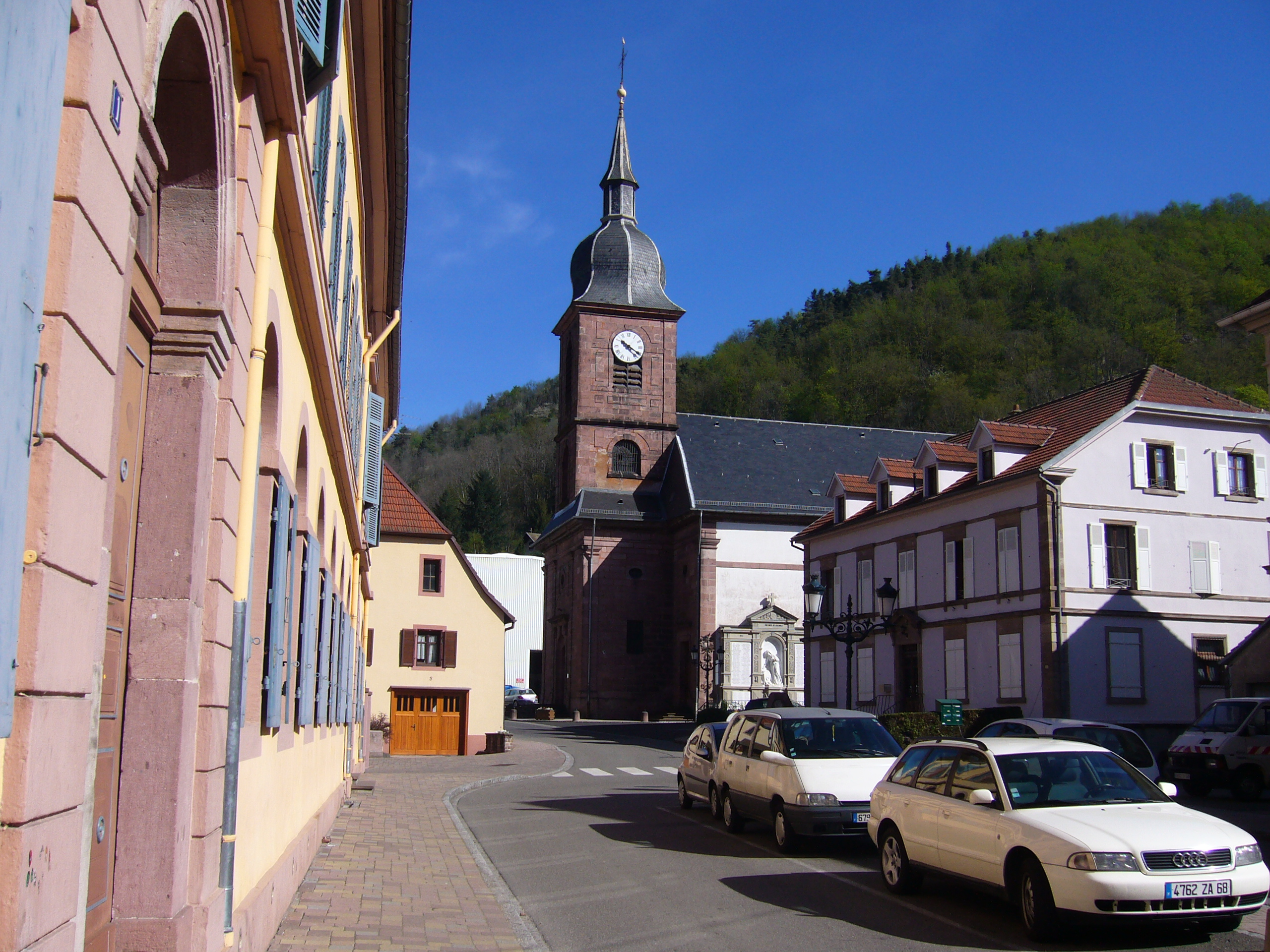
- The church in Sainte-Croix-aux-Mines

- Coat of arms
- Location of Sainte-Croix-aux-Mines
- Location within France Location within Grand Est
- Coordinates: 48°15′46″N 7°13′34″E
- Country: France
- Region: Grand Est
- Department: Haut-Rhin
- Arrondissement: Colmar-Ribeauvillé
- Canton: Sainte-Marie-aux-Mines
- Intercommunality: Val d'Argent

Government
  - Mayor (2020–2026): Jean-Marc Burrus
- Area^{1}: 27.85 km^{2} (10.75 sq mi)
- Elevation: 316 m (1,037 ft)
- Highest elevation: 980 m (3,220 ft)
- Lowest elevation: 290 m (950 ft)
- Population (2023): 1,742
  - Density: 62.55/km^{2} (162.0/sq mi)
- Time zone: UTC+01:00 (CET)
  - Summer (DST): UTC+02:00 (CEST)
- INSEE/Postal code: 68294 /68160
- ^{1} French Land Register data, which excludes lakes, ponds, glaciers > 1 km^{2} (0.386 sq mi or 247 acres) and river estuaries.

Sainte-Croix-aux-Mines (French pronunciation: [sɛ̃t kʁwa o min]; German: Sankt Kreuz im Lebertal; Alsatian: Sànkriz) is a commune in the Haut-Rhin department in Grand Est in north-eastern France. It is part of the arrondissement of Colmar-Ribeauvillé.

Coal mines were operating in the village until 1849.

== Geography ==
=== Climate ===
Sainte-Croix-aux-Mines has an oceanic climate (Köppen climate classification Cfb). The average annual temperature in Sainte-Croix-aux-Mines is 10.5 °C (50.9 °F). The average annual rainfall is 1,116.6 mm (43.96 in) with July as the wettest month. The temperatures are highest on average in July, at around 18.9 °C (66.0 °F), and lowest in January, at around 1.6 °C (34.9 °F). The highest temperature ever recorded in Sainte-Croix-aux-Mines was 39.6 °C (103.3 °F) on 25 July 2019; the coldest temperature ever recorded was −18.2 °C (−0.8 °F) on 20 December 2009.

Climate data for Sainte-Croix-aux-Mines (1981–2010 averages, extremes 2000−present)
Month	Jan	Feb	Mar	Apr	May	Jun	Jul	Aug	Sep	Oct	Nov	Dec	Year
Record high °C (°F)	18.0 (64.4)	22.8 (73.0)	27.4 (81.3)	29.1 (84.4)	33.5 (92.3)	36.9 (98.4)	39.6 (103.3)	38.8 (101.8)	34.2 (93.6)	29.3 (84.7)	22.7 (72.9)	17.2 (63.0)	39.6 (103.3)
Mean daily maximum °C (°F)	5.0 (41.0)	7.5 (45.5)	11.2 (52.2)	16.1 (61.0)	20.1 (68.2)	24.2 (75.6)	25.0 (77.0)	24.2 (75.6)	20.4 (68.7)	15.7 (60.3)	9.9 (49.8)	5.2 (41.4)	15.4 (59.7)
Daily mean °C (°F)	1.6 (34.9)	3.4 (38.1)	6.3 (43.3)	10.2 (50.4)	14.3 (57.7)	17.9 (64.2)	18.9 (66.0)	18.5 (65.3)	14.8 (58.6)	11.0 (51.8)	6.2 (43.2)	2.1 (35.8)	10.5 (50.9)
Mean daily minimum °C (°F)	−1.9 (28.6)	−0.8 (30.6)	1.4 (34.5)	4.2 (39.6)	8.4 (47.1)	11.5 (52.7)	12.9 (55.2)	12.7 (54.9)	9.2 (48.6)	6.2 (43.2)	2.5 (36.5)	−1.0 (30.2)	5.5 (41.9)
Record low °C (°F)	−14.8 (5.4)	−16.6 (2.1)	−13.8 (7.2)	−7.6 (18.3)	−0.8 (30.6)	2.8 (37.0)	5.6 (42.1)	4.8 (40.6)	0.9 (33.6)	−4.5 (23.9)	−7.6 (18.3)	−18.2 (−0.8)	−18.2 (−0.8)
Average precipitation mm (inches)	90.4 (3.56)	92.7 (3.65)	96.9 (3.81)	71.3 (2.81)	97.6 (3.84)	71.1 (2.80)	111.6 (4.39)	106.1 (4.18)	79.8 (3.14)	100.2 (3.94)	99.8 (3.93)	99.1 (3.90)	1,116.6 (43.96)
Average precipitation days (≥ 1.0 mm)	11.9	11.9	13.4	11.3	13.1	10.2	14.6	13.2	9.6	12.3	14.3	14.1	149.7
Source: Meteociel

== Notable residents ==
Maurice Burrus, a tobacco magnate and noted philatelist, was a resident. His home there, the Château Burrus, is a French monument historique.

== See also ==
- Communes of the Haut-Rhin department

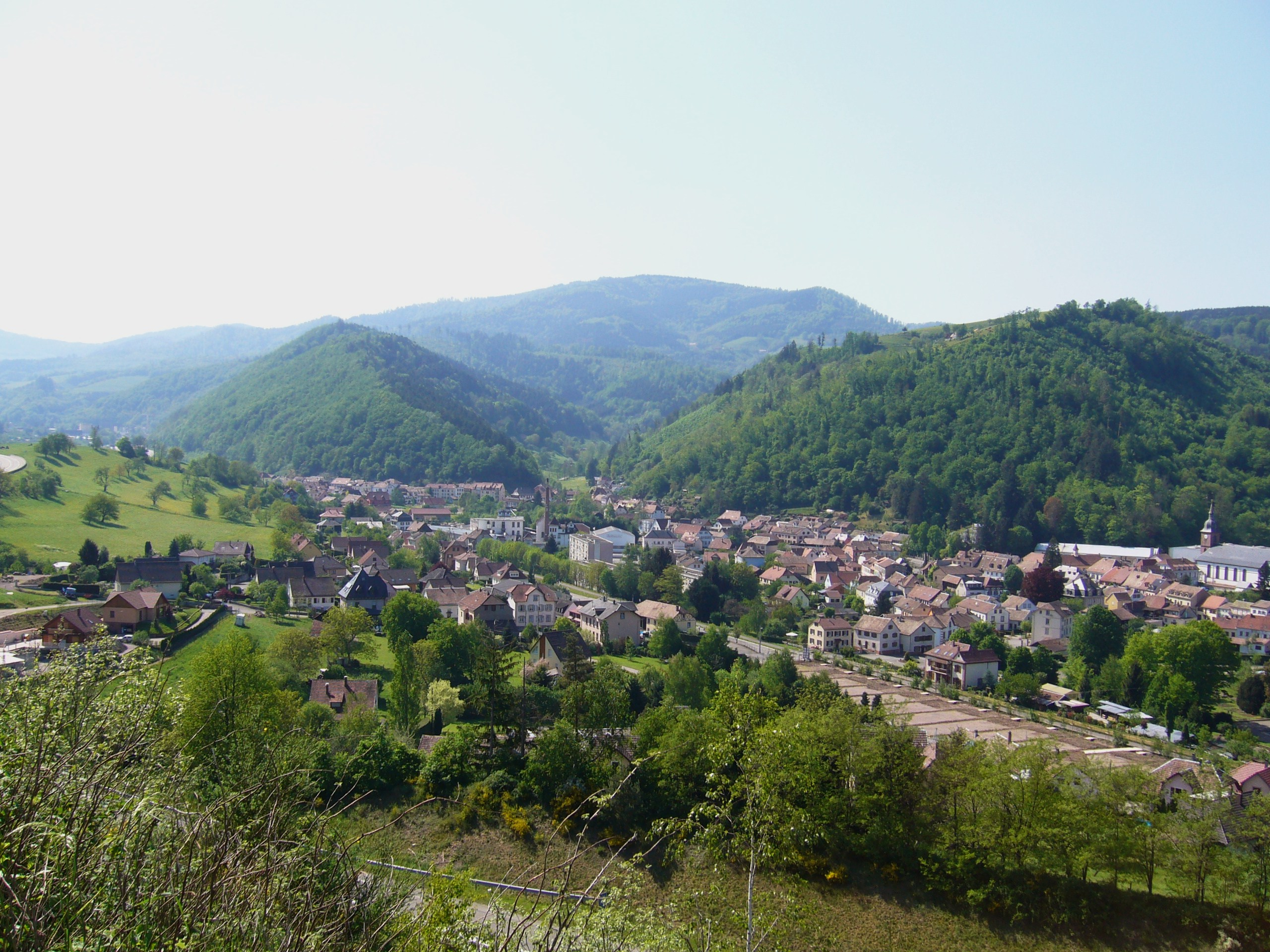
View of Sainte Croix-au-mines
