= Ernest J. Burrus =

American historian and Jesuit (1907–1991)

Ernest Joseph Burrus (1907–1991) was a Jesuit and a leading historian of northwestern New Spain, particularly the Baja California peninsula and Sonora. He made notable contributions by editing many accounts of the Jesuit period from European archives.

Burrus was born in El Paso, Texas, on April 20, 1907. He was ordained as a Jesuit priest in Innsbruck, Austria, in 1938. The following year, he was arrested and expelled by the Nazi regime. After teaching for 10 years, he was transferred in 1950 to work at the Jesuit Historical Institute in Rome. He died on December 11, 1991.

The documents he published, in Spanish, in English translation, or both, covered a wide geographical range, but focused particularly on northwestern New Spain. Among his most noteworthy book-length publications are a four-column history of the Jesuits in New Spain by Francisco Javier Alegre and accounts by Jesuit missionaries including Eusebio Francisco Kino, Juan María de Salvatierra, Francisco María Piccolo, Wenceslaus Linck, Benno Ducrue, and others. Burrus also produced many articles for scholarly journals.
