= Château Burrus =

French abandoned chateau in Alsace

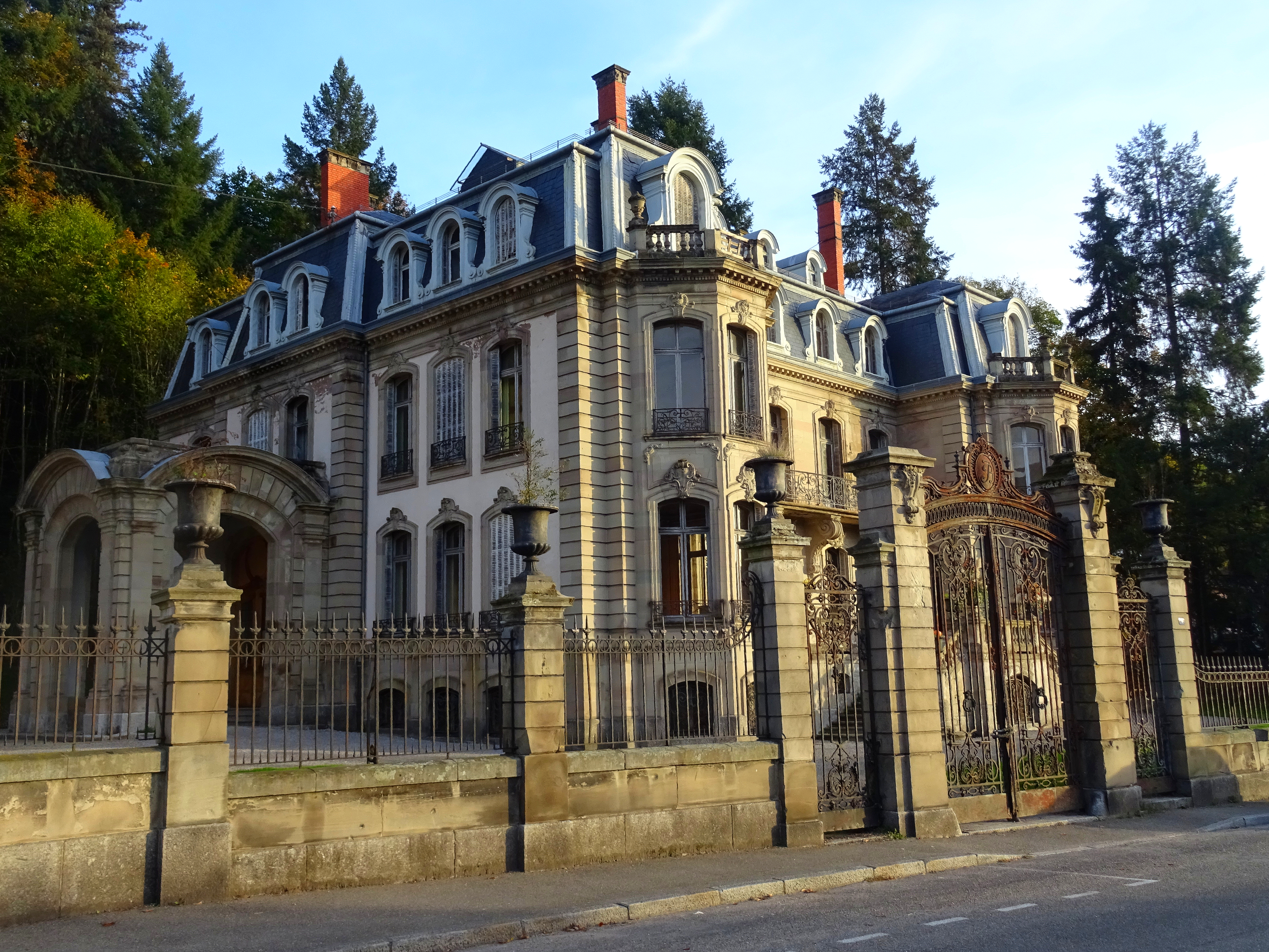
- The chateau in 2022, seen from the main street

- Location within France Château Burrus (Grand Est) Château Burrus (Alsace)

General information
- Status: Abandoned
- Location: 74, Rue Maurice Burrus, Sainte-Croix-aux-Mines, France
- Coordinates: 48.2629°N 7.2240°E
- Completed: 1900
- Owner: Maurice Burrus

Technical details
- Floor count: 3
- Lifts/elevators: 1

Design and construction
- Architects: Jules Berninger, Gustave Krafft

Monument historique
- Designated: 21 January 1993
- Reference no.: IA68007218

Château Burrus is a château in Sainte-Croix-aux-Mines, in the department of Haut-Rhin, Alsace, France. It was built in 1900 and has been listed as a historical monument since 1993.

== History ==
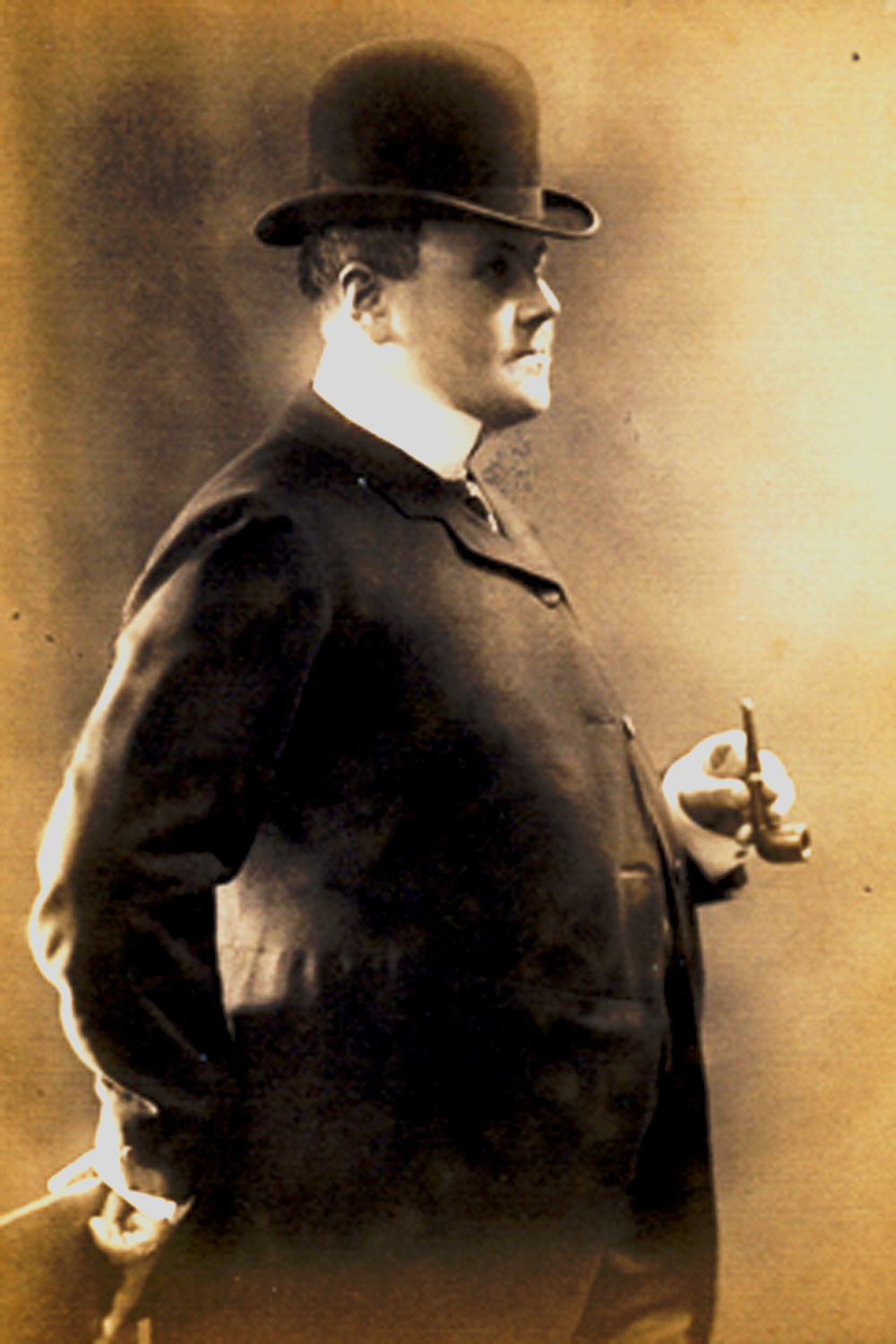
Maurice Burrus

It was the family home of Maurice Burrus, a tobacco manufacturer and famous boss, built in 1900. During the Second World War, the chateau was requisitioned and transformed into a training centre for SS officers. It is in neo-baroque style. Maurice Burrus belonged to one of the largest families of tobacco manufacturers. The factory was closed in 1947, and after Maurice's death in 1959, the building was sold to a religious congregation and then resold to private individuals. Today, the building has been abandoned and is often visited by urban explorers. In 2022 a family bought the château and started renovating it.

== Architecture ==
The chateau is in neo-baroque style like Opéra Garnier (1875) or Saint-Maurice church in Freyming-Merlebach (1913). The architects are two Alsatians who studied in Stuttgart and at the École des Beaux-Arts in Paris, Jules Berninger and his brother-in-law Gustave Krafft.

The ground floor consists of eight rooms and a large hall.

The hall features Ionic and Corinthian-style columns and is adorned with fake yellow marble. It is in the centre of the chateau and opens onto all the rooms and all the floors.

The green room is adorned with mirror holders which considerably enlarge the room. It is adorned with a ceiling painted with a slightly cloudy sky.

The red room is the most opulent, with its two fake red marble columns, its copper gilding which magnifies all the ceiling details, doors and walls covered in some places with red satin silk tapestries.

The wooden room is, as its name suggests, all in wood from floor to ceiling and half of the wall covered with embossed cardboard tapestries. Renaissance-style furniture proudly stands in the room.

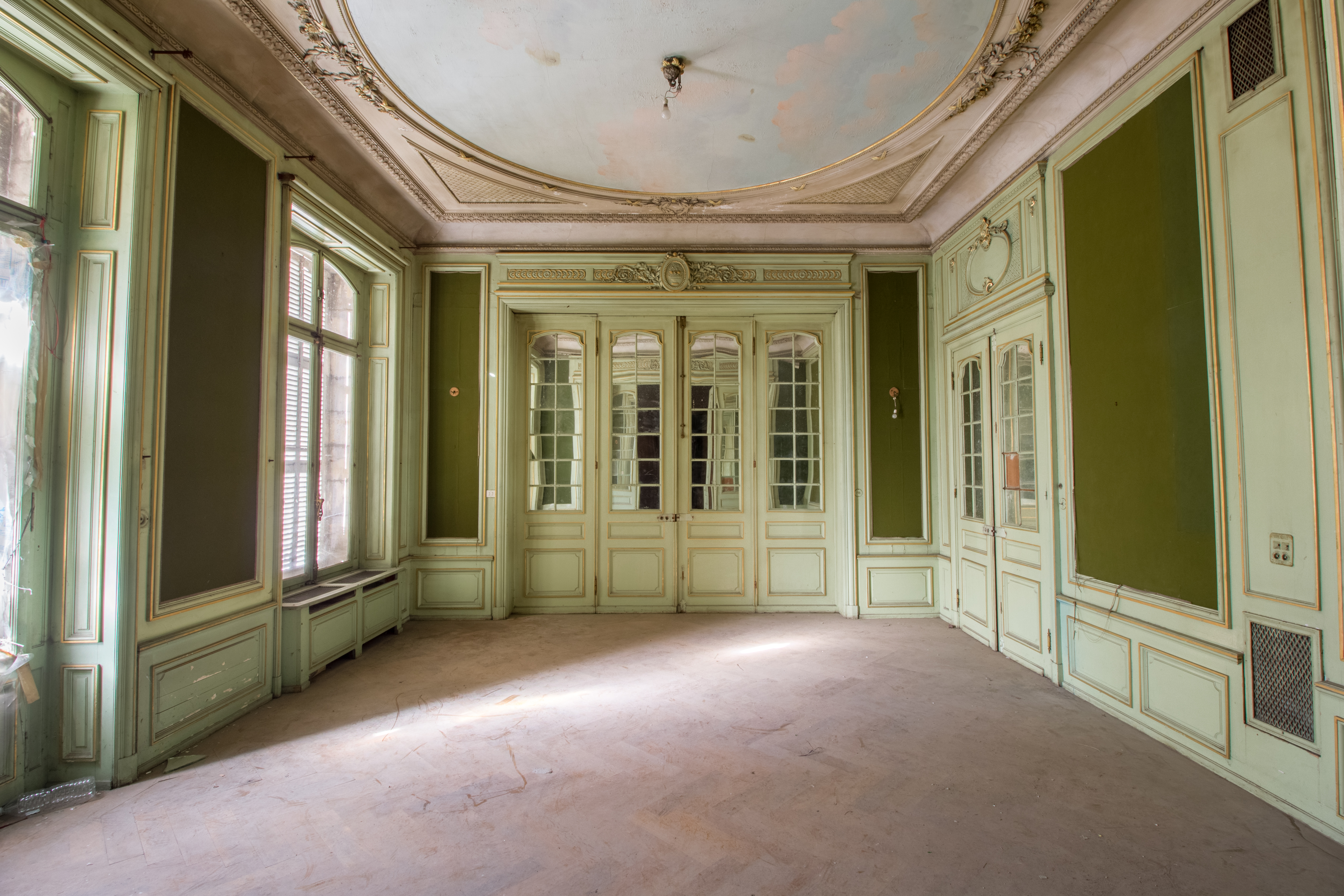
The green room

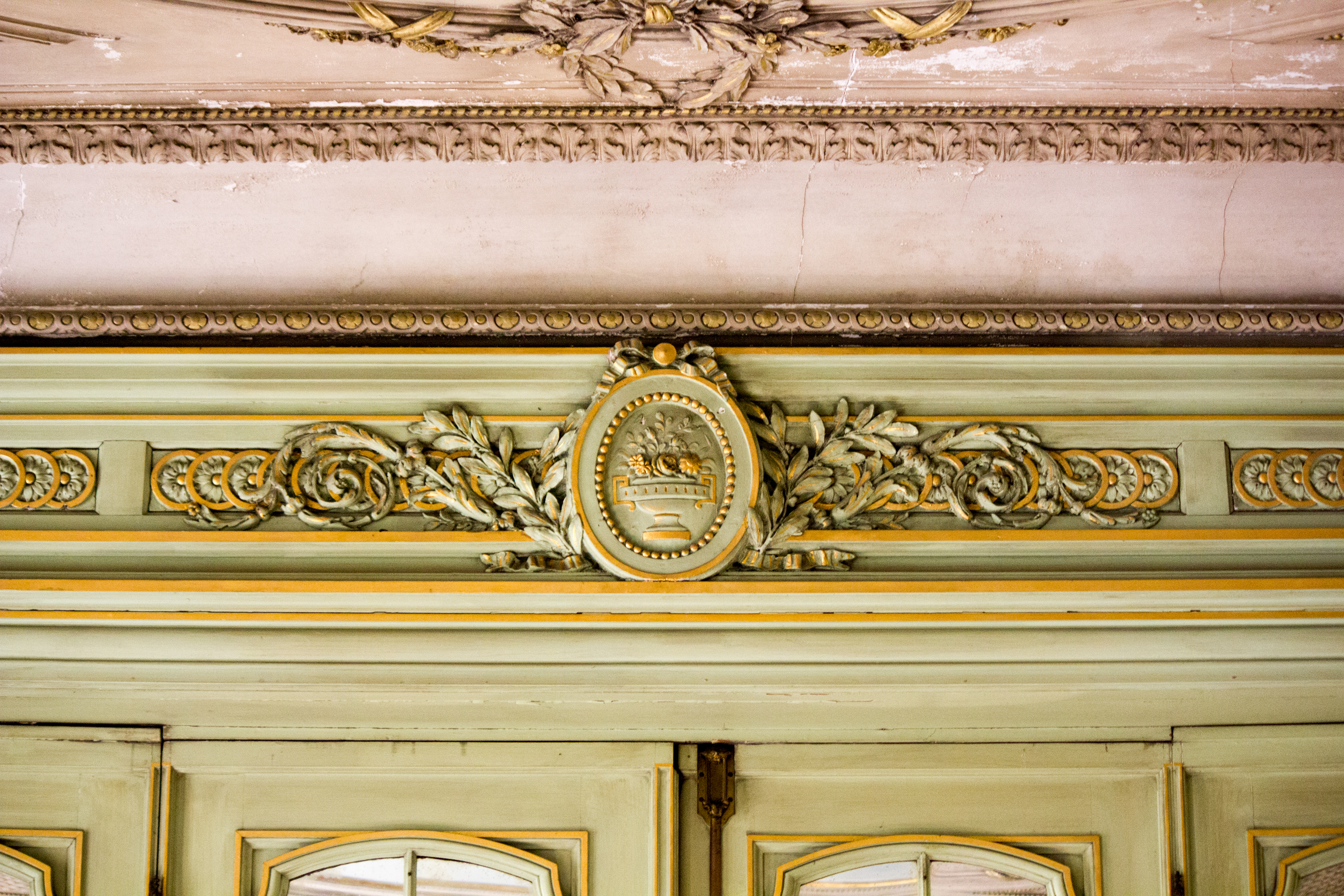
The green room

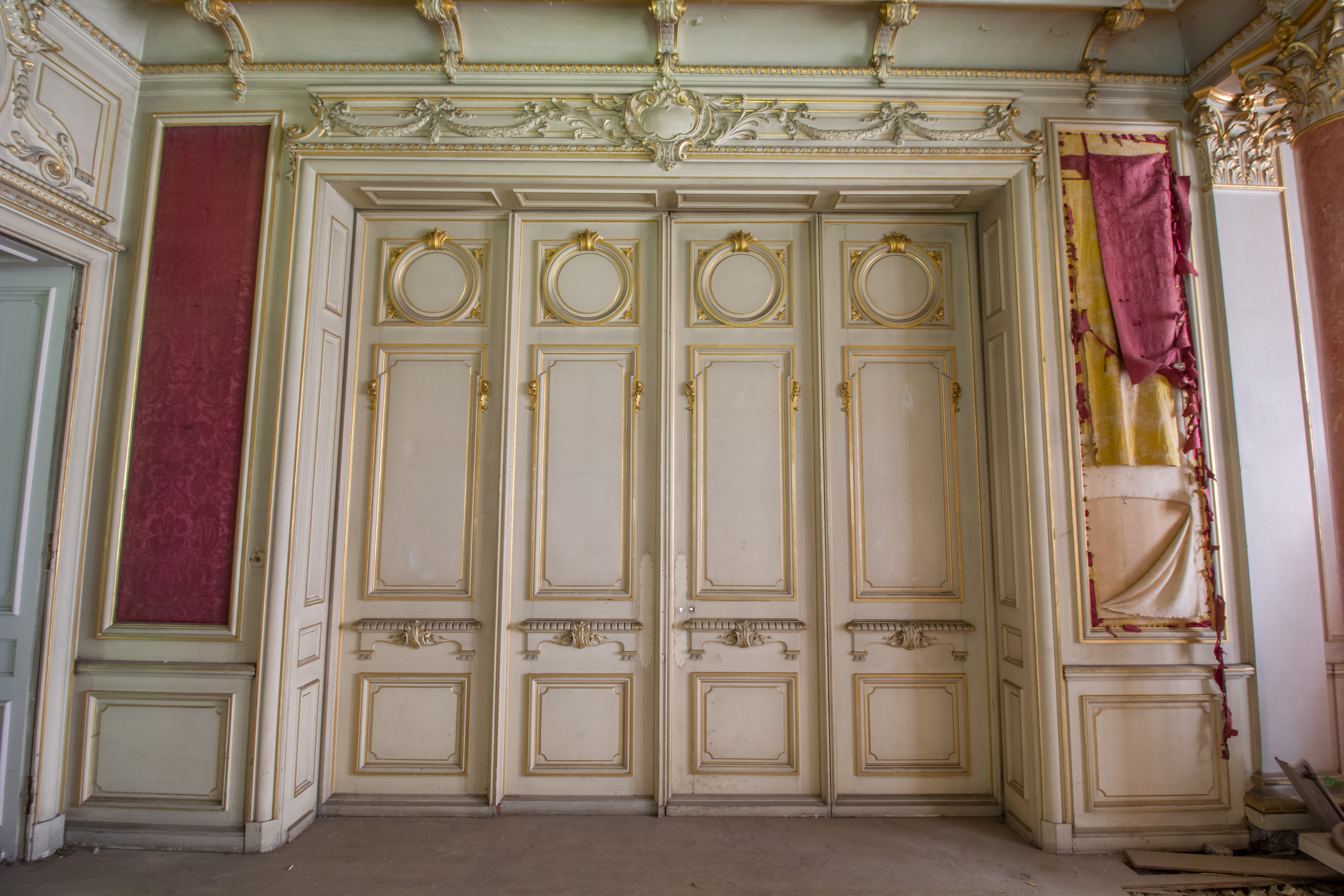
The doors of the red room

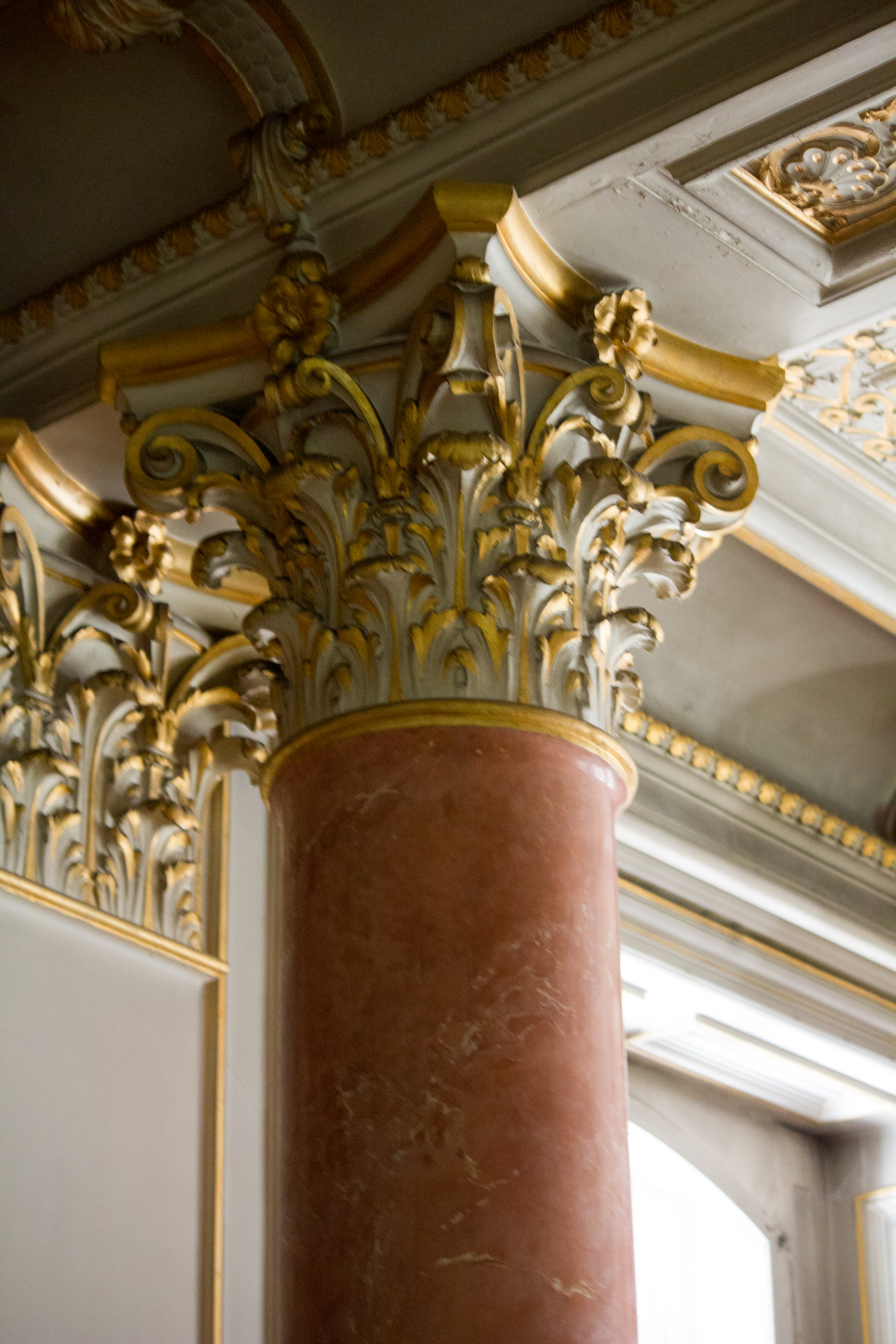
Columns in the red room

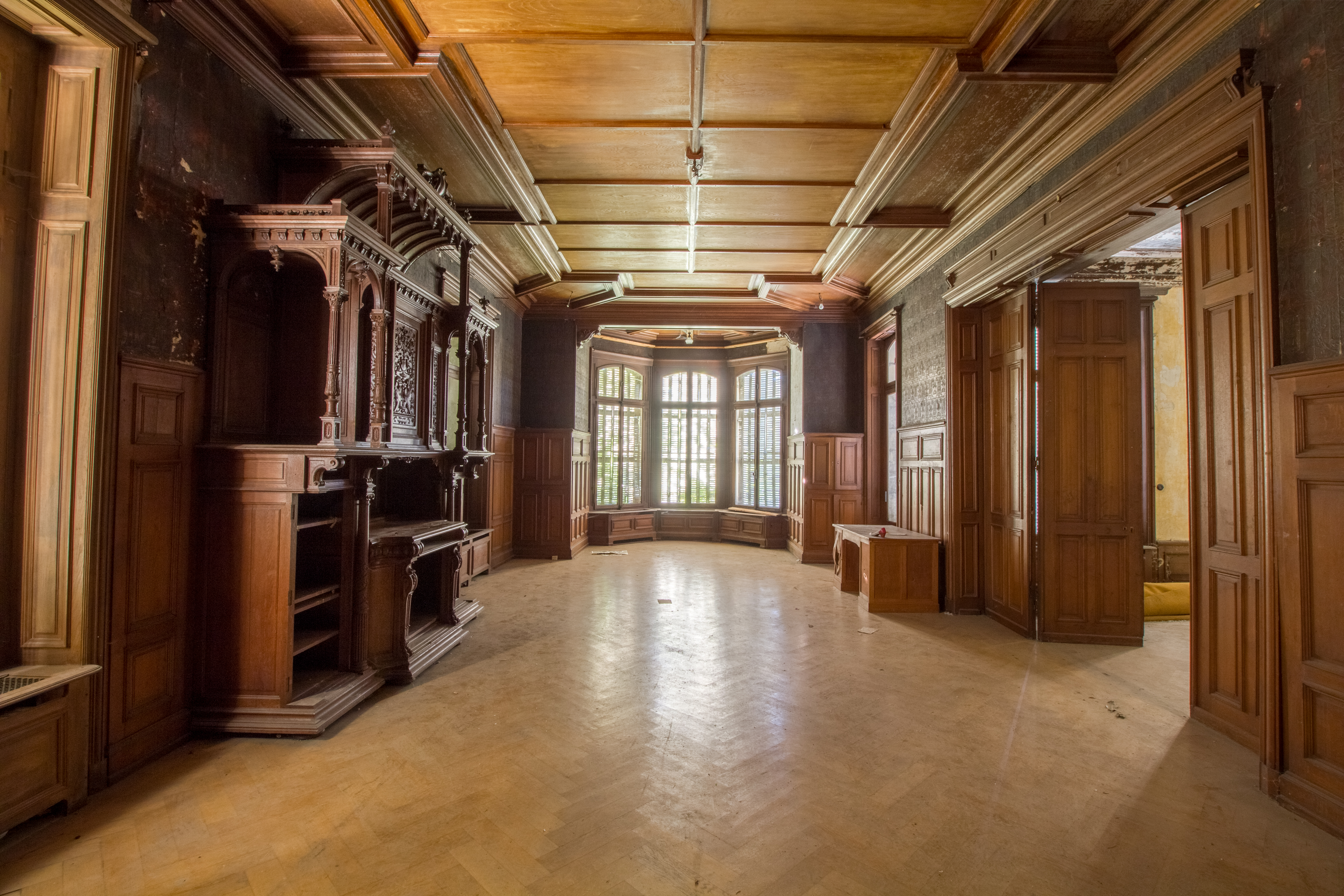
The wooden room

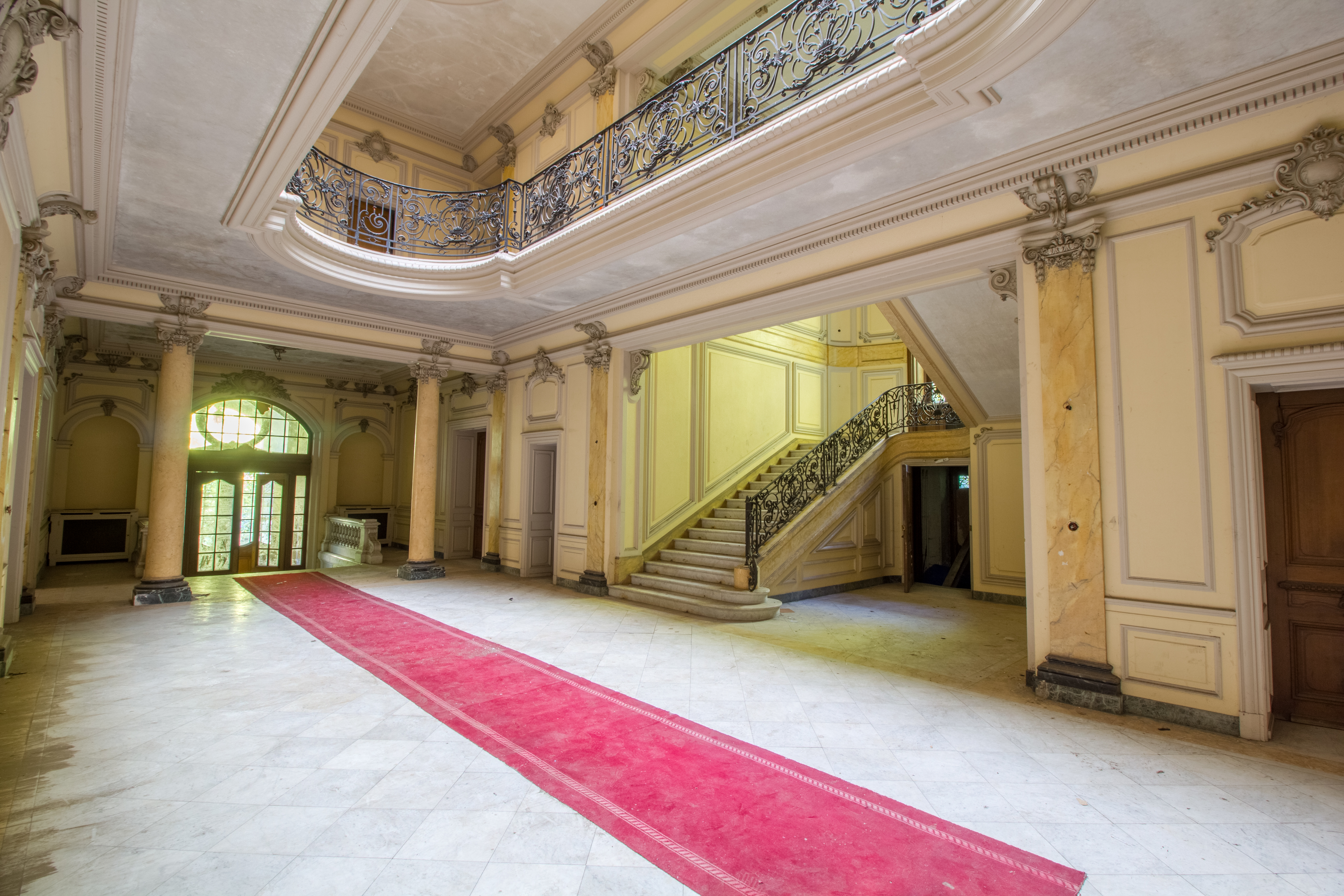
The hall and its fake yellow marble

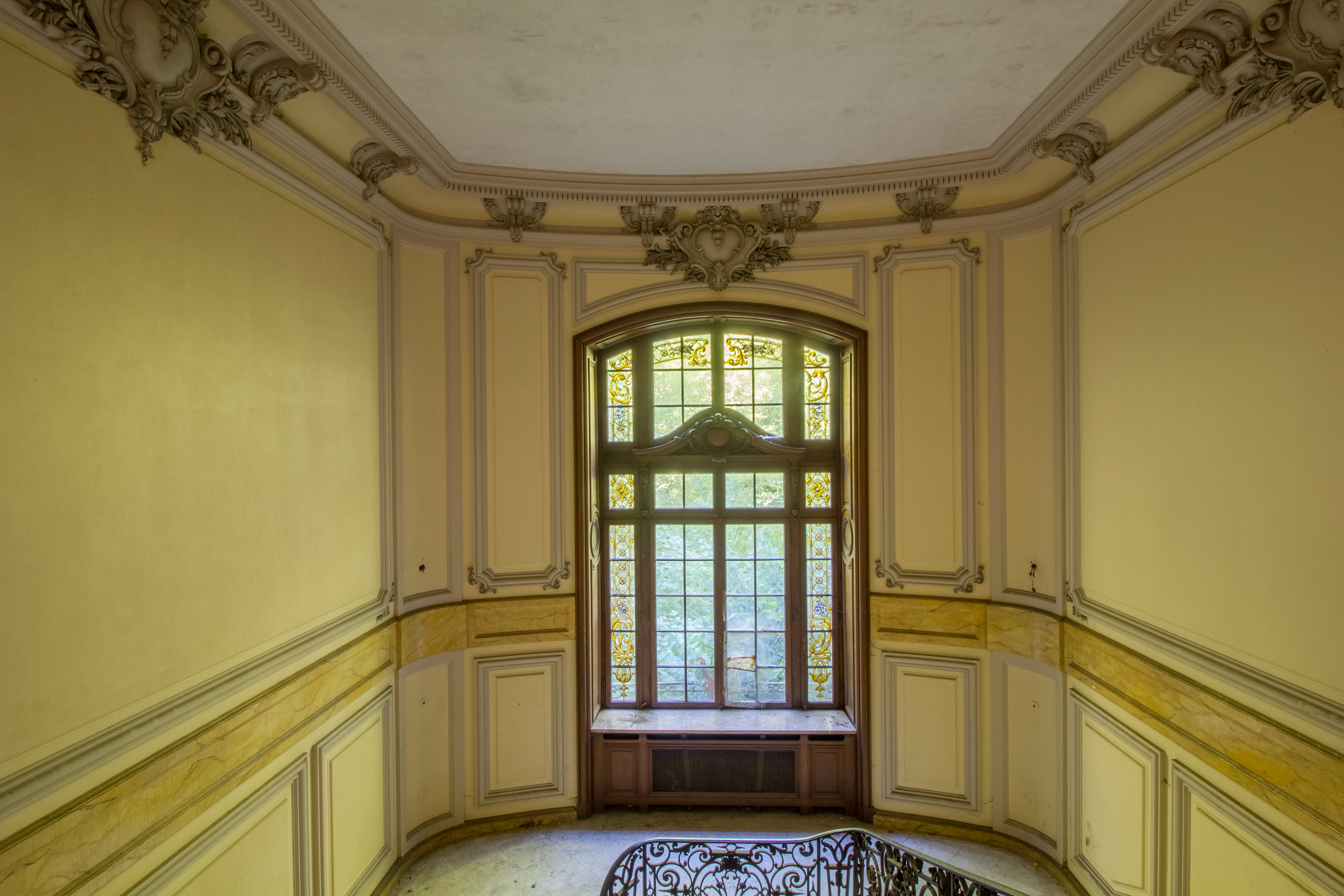
The stairs and its large window

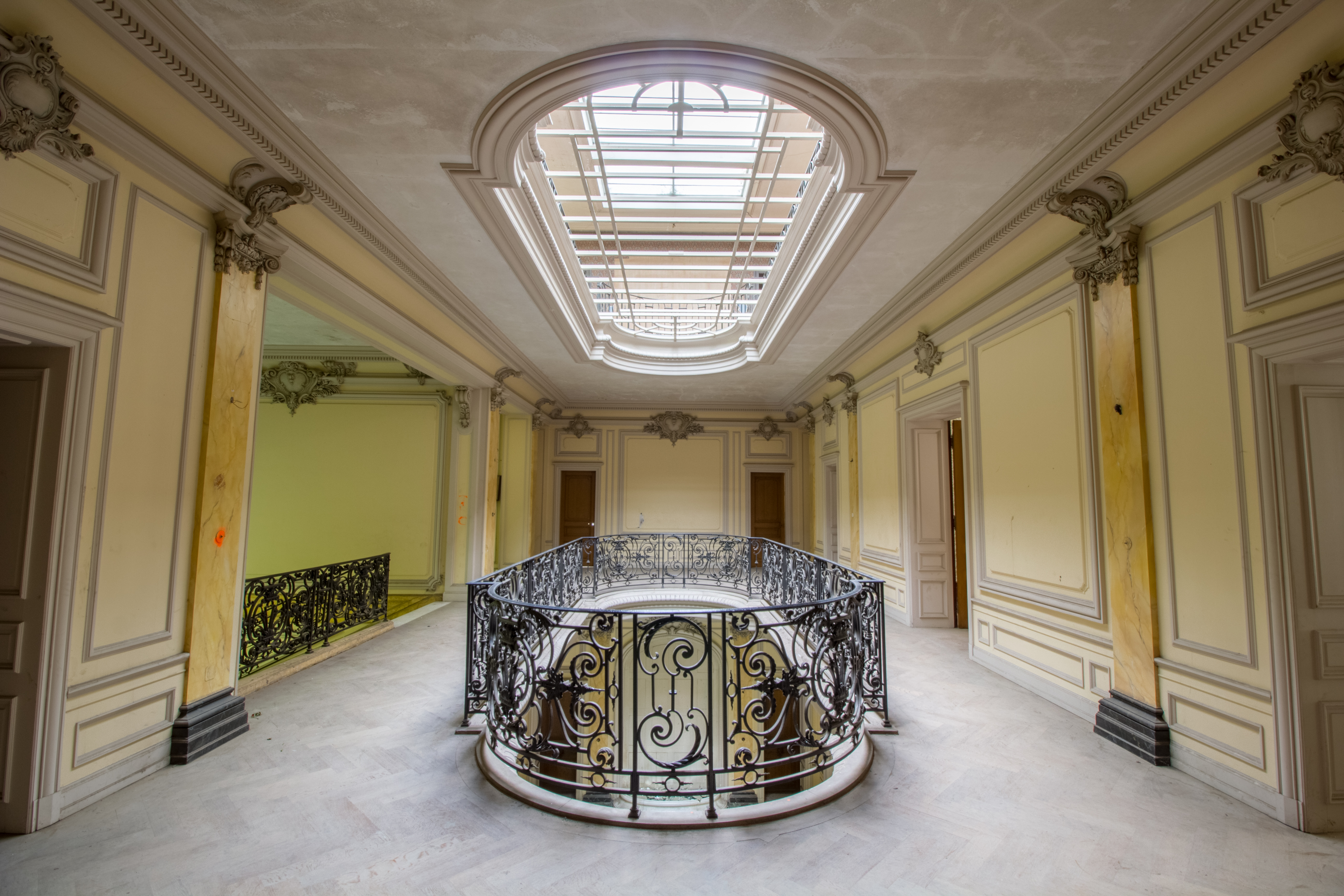
View of the glass roof from the first floor
