= Parlement of Besançon =

Coordinates: 47°14′14″N 6°01′23″E

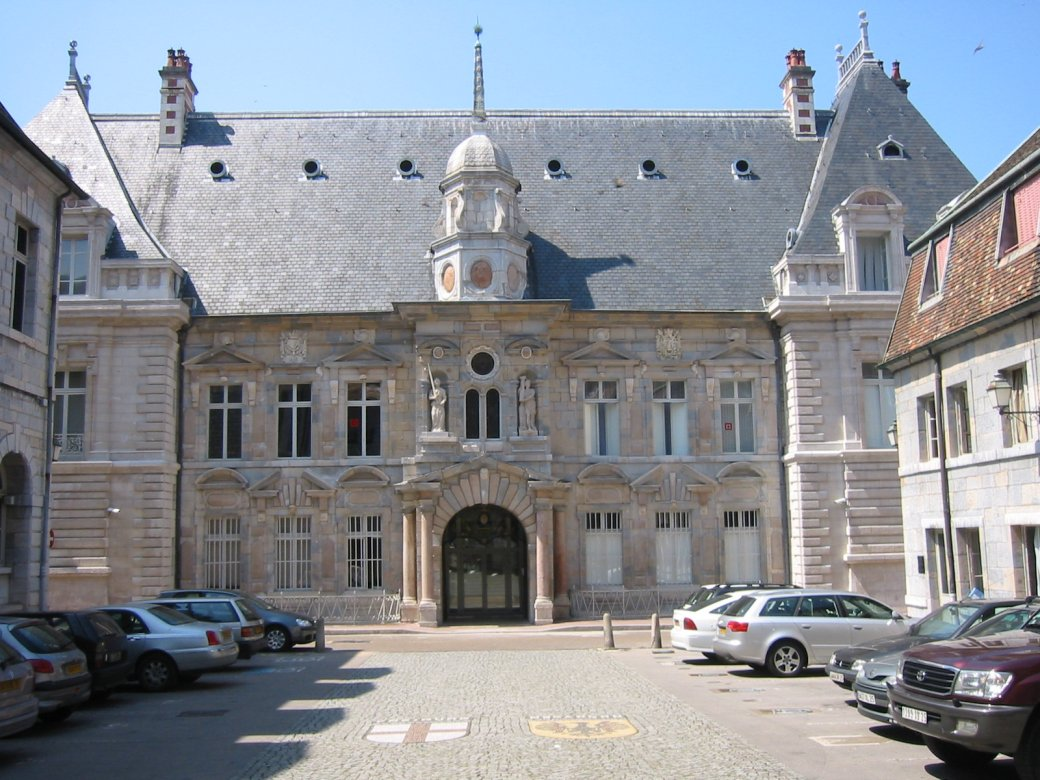
Facade by Hugues Sambin

The Parlement of Besançon (French: Parlement de Besançon) was one of the parlements of the French Ancien Régime, seated in Besançon, in the province of Franche-Comté. It was created in 1676. The previous parlement for much of the region had been at Dole, Jura, and had been created in 1422.

In 1674, French troops took the city of Besançon, which the Treaty of Nijmegen (1678) then awarded to France. In 1676 the French authorities wound up the previously democratic form of government of the formerly Free City of Besançon. As part of the deal the city became the administrative centre for Franche-Comté, with the Parlement of Besançon administering the area, replacing the Parlement of Dole.

Franche-Comté was one of the last parts of France to have serfdom. The Parlement of Besançon blocked a decree from Louis XVI banning degrading practices towards serfs from 1779 until 1787.
