= Daniel Burrus =

Technology futurist: hard and soft trend predictor

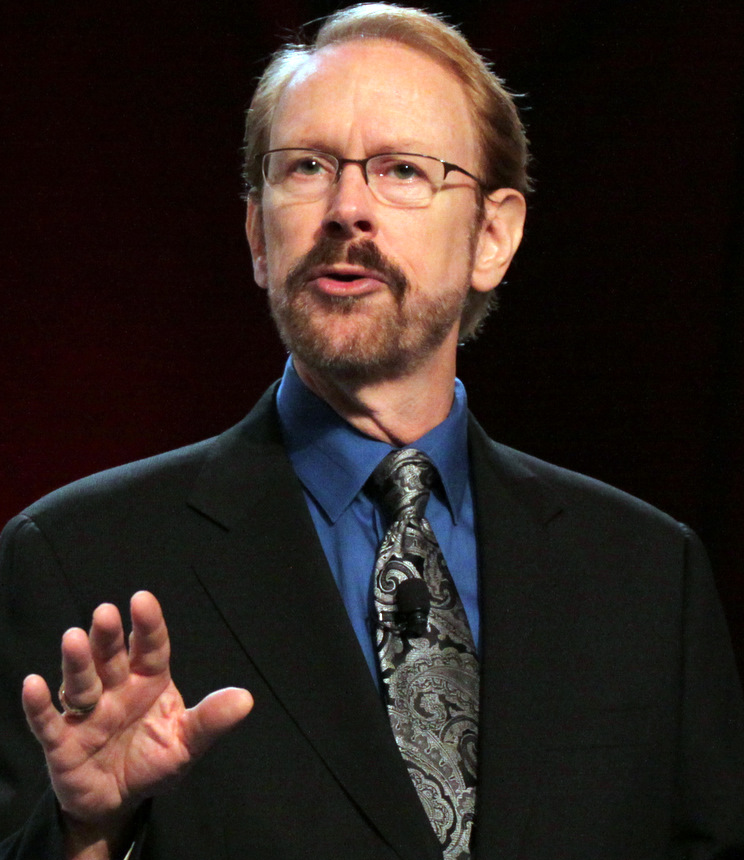
- Born: Portland, Oregon
- Education: University of Wisconsin–Oshkosh
- Occupations: Author, Technology Futurist, Business strategist, Keynote Speaker
- Website: burrus.com

Daniel Burrus is an American technology futurist, business adviser, author, and public speaker in the areas of business strategy, global trends, and disruptive innovation. He has written on the topics of business transformation and technology-driven trends, with his book Flash Foresight becoming a New York Times Bestseller in 2011.

The New York Times described Daniel Burrus as a "futurist who talks about how a vision of times ahead can shape business decisions today." Forbes magazine recognized his career as a "strategic advisor to executives from Fortune 500 companies" given his role as a technology trends researcher.

== Early life and education ==
Burrus was born in Portland, Oregon. He grew up in the Milwaukee, Wisconsin area.

Daniel Burrus attended the Wisconsin State University-Oshkosh, where he had graduated in 1971 with a bachelor's degree. Burrus and fellow student Bill Gray, during their senior year, were awarded a research grant from the United States Department of Education to establish a student training assistance program. He and Bill Gray were co-directors of the first federally funded program of its kind in the nation. The program offered free tutoring for collegians with deficiencies in specific academic subjects, sample test files, class notes, textbook exchange, general information and referral, assistance in registration, and help in selection of courses and teachers. While working on a graduate degree, Burrus became a science teacher (1971-1978). Early in his teaching career, he was nominated for an Educator of the Year Award and went on to found and manage six businesses.

== Career ==
As founder and CEO of the research and consulting firm Burrus Research, Burrus is an active futurist keynote speaker. In 2017, Forbes magazine recognized his career as a "strategic advisor to executives from Fortune 500 companies" given his role as a technology trends researcher. Burrus has a worldwide reputation for anticipating technological change and its impact on the world of business. According to Denmark's Manage Magazine, he founded six separate companies between 1971 and 2009, including:

- Burrus Research Associates, Inc., president and founder, 1983–present
- Visionary Apps, LLC, 2009-2014
- Ultrasports, Inc., president and founder, 1982-1984
- Burrus Powered Gliders, Inc., president, 1979-1982
- Midwest Skynasaurs, president, 1982-1984
- Burrus Media Productions, president, 1978-1980

Three of these were regarded as national leaders in the U.S., five of which were profitable within the first year of their operation.

Seven books reflect his authority as a disruptor and futurist most notably with the New York Times bestseller Flash Foresight: How to See the Invisible and Do the Impossible (2011).: and the book The Anticipatory Organization. Burrus has delivered thousands of speeches as a professional speaker certified by the National Speakers Association (NSA). The NSA Council of Peers Award for Excellence (CPAE) honored Burrus with its Speaker Hall of Fame Award. Burrus has written more than a dozen books and has also written for the Harvard Business Review, Wired magazine, The Huffington Post, and LinkedIn, where he has more than a million subscribers as of 2020. As a blogger, he has also contributed to CNBC, Big Think, Examiner.com, and Business 2 Community.

Daniel Burrus joined the National Board of Advisors at High Point University in 2015.

== Hard Trend Methodology ==
Daniel Burrus invented Hard Trend Methodology as a component of his Anticipatory Organization Model. His methodology for separating "hard trends" (trends that will happen) vs. "soft trends" (trends that might happen) was the subject of PBS television specials. A "Hard Trend" is a projection based on measurable, tangible, and fully predictable facts, events, or objects. Strategy based on the certainty of Hard Trends is said to be low risk. A Soft Trend is a projection based on statistics that has the appearance of being tangible, fully predictable facts. Soft Trends are described as changeable.

== Works ==
=== Books ===
1. The Anticipatory Organization: Turn Disruption and Change into Opportunity and Advantage. Greenleaf Book Group Press. (2017), ISBN 9781626344464.
  1. The Anticipatory Organization (Chinese Edition) Zhejiang University Press. (2019) ISBN 9787308190268
  2. The Anticipatory Organization Mem Cards Burrus Research (2017); card game.
2. Flash Foresight: How to See the Invisible and Do the Impossible. HarperCollins. (2011). ISBN 0061922293. Available in multiple languages.
3. Speaking Secrets of the Masters. Executive Books. (1995). ISBN 9780937539224.
4. Technotrends: How to Use Technology to Go Beyond Your Competition. Collins. (1994). ISBN 0887307000. Available in multiple languages.
5. Insights into Excellence. Executive Books. (1993). ISBN 9780937539156.
6. Medical Advances: a user-friendly guide to the latest technology. Kendall/Hunt Publishing Co. (1990). ISBN 0840361785.
7. The New Tools of Technology. Kendall/Hunt Publishing Co. (1990). ISBN 1880136503.
8. Environmental Solutions. Kendall/Hunt Publishing Co. (1990). ISBN 0840361793.
9. Advances in Agriculture. Kendall/Hunt Publishing Co. (1990). ISBN 0840361807.

=== Audio books ===
1. Flash Foresight. (2011). Harper Audio.
2. Reengineering Yourself: Using Tomorrow's Success Tools To Excel Today. Nightingale-Conant. Nightingale-Conant. (1996). ISBN 0671572938.
3. Technotrends. (1993). HarperAudio.
4. Futureview: Your Competitive Edge. (1990). Burrus Research Publications.
5. Futureview: A Look Ahead, Volume 2. (1990). Burrus Research Publications.
6. Maximizing Your Creativity. (1988). Burrus Research Publications.
7. Futureview: A Keynote Speech. (1985). Burrus Research Publications.
8. Futureview: A Look Ahead. (1985). Burrus Research Publications.
9. Teaching Creativity. (1985). Burrus Research Publications.
10. The Future of Education. (1985). Burrus Research Publications.
11. Beyond Megatrends. (1984). Burrus Research Publications.

=== Magazines ===
1. Know What's Next Magazine 2019 Vol. 10 : Strategies for Transforming Your Business And Future. Burrus Research. (2019).
2. Know What's Next Magazine 2018 Vol. 9: Strategies for Transforming Your Business And Future. Burrus Research. (2018).
3. Know What's Next Magazine 2017: Strategies for Transforming Your Business And Future. Burrus Research. (2017).
4. Know What's Next Magazine 2016: Strategies for Transforming Your Business And Future. Burrus Research. (2016).
5. Know What's Next Magazine 2015: Strategies for Transforming Your Business And Future. Burrus Research. (2015).
6. Know What's Next Magazine 2014: Strategies for Transforming Your Business And Future. Burrus Research Associates. (2014).
7. Know What's Next Magazine 2013: Strategies for Transforming Your Business and Future. Burrus Research Associates. These were published yearly since 2009.

=== Newsletters ===
- Daniel Burrus’ Strategic Insights. June 2012 – present.
- Consumer Intentions and Actions Newsletter. 2000–2010.
- Technotrends Newsletter. October 1990 – present.
- Technology Futures Newsletter. 1985-September 1993.
- Applied Science Review. Published in 1985 and 1988.

=== Video learning system ===
- The Anticipatory Leader Learning System (2018). Burrus Research Publications.
- The Anticipatory Organization Learning System. (2014). Burrus Research Publications.
- Teaching the Future Today. (1990). Burrus Research Publications.

=== Business strategy games ===
- Marketing Advantage Business Strategy Game. (2000). Burrus Research.
- Advantage Business Strategy Game. (1998). Burrus Research.
- Technotrends Business Strategy Game. (1993). US Games.

=== Education strategy game ===
- Designing Thriving Schools. (2000). Burrus Research.

=== Television show ===
- FutureScope (local cable).

== Awards and accomplishments ==
- Top 21 Speakers for the 21st Century by Successful Meetings Magazine
- Top Five Futurists and Technology Speakers
- CPAE Professional Speakers Hall of Fame, CSP, CPAE, 1990
- University of Wisconsin Oshkosh, Distinguished Alumni Award, 2001
- Experimental Aircraft Association, Ultralight Division, founder
- Personal Robot Association, founder
- Cleary University, Honorary Doctor of Business, 2011
- University of Wisconsin Oshkosh, Honorary Doctorate, 2017
