= Dole, Jura =

Subprefecture and commune in Bourgogne-Franche-Comté, France

Dole
- Subprefecture and commune
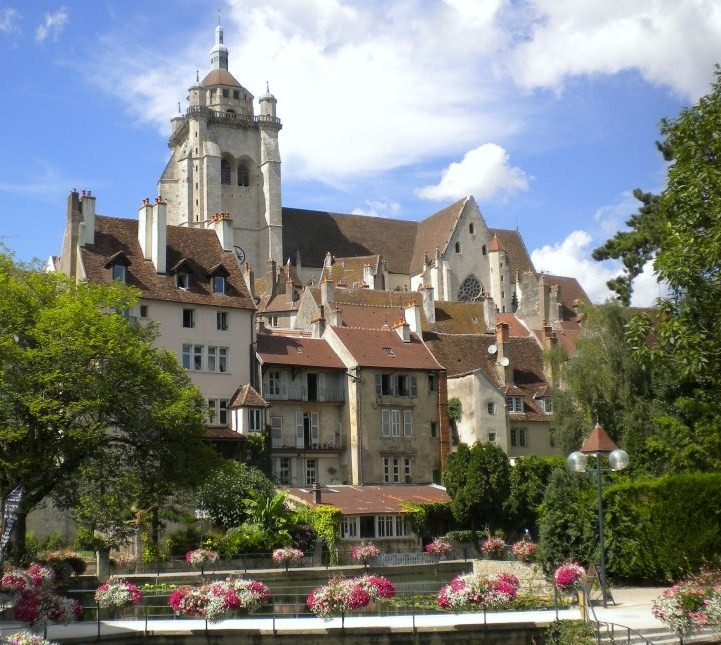
- Old Dole

- Coat of arms
- Location of Dole
- Location within France Location within Bourgogne-Franche-Comté
- Coordinates: 47°05′35″N 5°29′26″E
- Country: France
- Region: Bourgogne-Franche-Comté
- Department: Jura
- Arrondissement: Dole
- Canton: Dole-1 and 2
- Intercommunality: CA Grand Dole

Government
  - Mayor (2020–2026): Jean-Baptiste Gagnoux
- Area^{1}: 38.38 km^{2} (14.82 sq mi)
- Highest elevation: 341 m (1,119 ft)
- Lowest elevation: 196 m (643 ft)
- Population (2023): 23,840
  - Density: 621.2/km^{2} (1,609/sq mi)
- Time zone: UTC+01:00 (CET)
  - Summer (DST): UTC+02:00 (CEST)
- INSEE/Postal code: 39198 /39100
- Website: www.doledujura.fr
- ^{1} French Land Register data, which excludes lakes, ponds, glaciers > 1 km^{2} (0.386 sq mi or 247 acres) and river estuaries.

Dole (French pronunciation: [dɔl], sometimes pronounced [dol]) is a commune in the eastern French department of Jura, of which it is a subprefecture (sous-préfecture).

== History ==
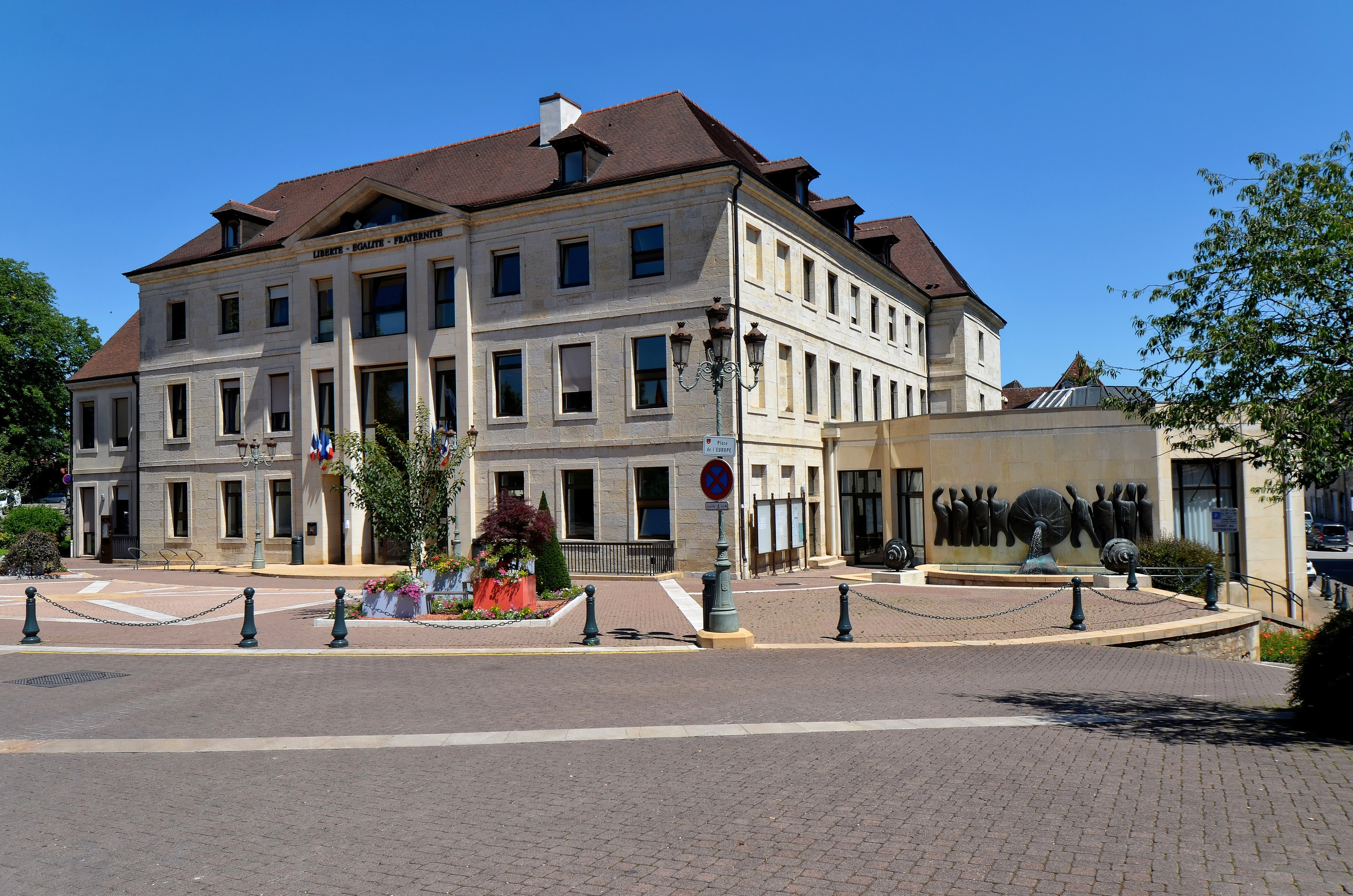
The Hôtel de Ville

Dole was the capital of Franche-Comté until Louis XIV conquered the region; he shifted the parlement from Dole to Besançon. The university, founded by Duke Philippe le Bon of Burgundy in 1422, was also transferred to Besançon at that time.

In January 1573, Gilles Garnier was put to death after being found guilty of lycanthropy and witchcraft. He had confessed to murdering and cannibalizing at least four children.

The Dole Hôtel de Ville was converted from a prison in 1988.

The 1995 film Happiness Is in the Field was set in Dole and The Widow Couderc was also partially filmed there.

== Geography ==
Dole is located on the river Doubs. The commune has a land area of 38.38 km^{2} (14.82 sq mi).

== Demographics ==
It is the most populous commune in Jura, although the préfecture is Lons-le-Saunier.

Historical population

Year	Pop.	±% p.a.
1793	9,000	—
1800	8,235	−1.26%
1806	8,678	+0.88%
1821	9,647	+0.71%
1831	9,927	+0.29%
1836	10,137	+0.42%
1841	10,713	+1.11%
1846	10,519	−0.36%
1851	10,830	+0.58%
1856	10,985	+0.28%
1861	10,605	−0.70%
1866	11,093	+0.90%
1872	11,679	+0.86%
1876	12,924	+2.56%
1881	13,190	+0.41%
1886	13,293	+0.16%
1891	14,253	+1.40%
1896	14,437	+0.26%
1901	14,627	+0.26%

Year	Pop.	±% p.a.
1906	14,838	+0.29%
1911	16,294	+1.89%
1921	16,208	−0.05%
1926	18,093	+2.22%
1931	18,066	−0.03%
1936	18,117	+0.06%
1946	18,250	+0.07%
1954	22,022	+2.38%
1962	24,525	+1.35%
1968	27,188	+1.73%
1975	29,295	+1.07%
1982	26,889	−1.22%
1990	26,577	−0.15%
1999	24,949	−0.70%
2007	25,051	+0.05%
2012	23,685	−1.12%
2017	23,708	+0.02%
2023	23,840	+0.09%

Source: EHESS and INSEE (1968-2023)

== Transport ==
Dole-Ville station has rail connections to Dijon, Paris, Lausanne and Besançon. Dole – Jura Airport is located in the commune of Tavaux, 7 km southwest of Dole.

== Famous residents ==
- Suzanne Douvillier (1778 – 1826), pioneer dancer and choreographer.
- Simon Bernard (28 April 1779 – 5 November 1839)- Napoleonic aide de camp and notable engineer in the United States.
- Marie Émile Antoine Béthouart (17 December 1889 – 17 October 1982), soldier.
- Louis Pasteur (27 December 1822 – 28 September 1895), microbiologist and chemist
- Jacques Duhamel (1924 - 1977), mayor of Dole from 1968 to 1976
- Michel Chapuis (15 January 1930 – 12 November 2017), organist
- Hubert-Félix Thiéfaine (21 July 1948 − ), pop-rock singer and songwriter, born in Dole

== Museums ==
The Museum of Fine Arts, Dole founded in 1821, is located in the House of the Officers, an example of military architecture of Franche-Comté at the 18th century.

== Twin towns and sister cities ==
Dole is twinned with:

- (Republic of Ireland) Carlow, Ireland
- Chaohu, China
- Kostroma, Russia
- Lahr, Germany
- Northwich, England, United Kingdom
- Sestri Levante, Italy
- Tábor, Czech Republic

== Climate ==
Climate data for Dole (1991–2020 normals, extremes 1959–present)
Month	Jan	Feb	Mar	Apr	May	Jun	Jul	Aug	Sep	Oct	Nov	Dec	Year
Record high °C (°F)	17.8 (64.0)	21.5 (70.7)	26.0 (78.8)	31.0 (87.8)	33.1 (91.6)	38.0 (100.4)	40.0 (104.0)	40.0 (104.0)	36.0 (96.8)	30.0 (86.0)	23.2 (73.8)	18.0 (64.4)	40.0 (104.0)
Mean daily maximum °C (°F)	6.1 (43.0)	8.1 (46.6)	13.2 (55.8)	17.3 (63.1)	21.2 (70.2)	25.2 (77.4)	27.5 (81.5)	27.2 (81.0)	22.4 (72.3)	16.9 (62.4)	10.3 (50.5)	6.7 (44.1)	16.8 (62.2)
Daily mean °C (°F)	2.8 (37.0)	3.9 (39.0)	7.7 (45.9)	11.1 (52.0)	15.1 (59.2)	18.8 (65.8)	20.8 (69.4)	20.5 (68.9)	16.4 (61.5)	12.1 (53.8)	6.7 (44.1)	3.6 (38.5)	11.6 (52.9)
Mean daily minimum °C (°F)	−0.4 (31.3)	−0.4 (31.3)	2.2 (36.0)	4.9 (40.8)	9.0 (48.2)	12.4 (54.3)	14.1 (57.4)	13.8 (56.8)	10.4 (50.7)	7.4 (45.3)	3.1 (37.6)	0.5 (32.9)	6.4 (43.5)
Record low °C (°F)	−24.0 (−11.2)	−18.0 (−0.4)	−14.1 (6.6)	−5.5 (22.1)	−3.8 (25.2)	0.8 (33.4)	1.5 (34.7)	3.5 (38.3)	0.0 (32.0)	−6.0 (21.2)	−9.5 (14.9)	−18.0 (−0.4)	−24.0 (−11.2)
Average precipitation mm (inches)	77.8 (3.06)	71.6 (2.82)	72.5 (2.85)	79.1 (3.11)	96.8 (3.81)	80.0 (3.15)	78.8 (3.10)	83.7 (3.30)	86.6 (3.41)	103.9 (4.09)	104.1 (4.10)	88.1 (3.47)	1,023 (40.28)
Average precipitation days (≥ 1.0 mm)	12.5	11.1	10.8	10.0	11.5	9.3	9.3	9.4	9.2	11.5	12.6	13.5	130.8
Source: Meteociel

== See also ==
- Arrondissement of Dole
- Communes of the Jura department
