= Parlement of Dole =

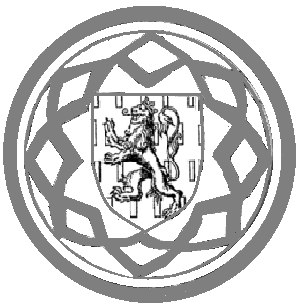
The Parliament's seal.

The Parlement of Dole was the parlement for the County of Burgundy, set up at the end of the 14th century and active until 1676, when it moved to Besançon. It was the County's most important institution, ranking above its Estates and governors.

It was held in the now-lost palais du Parlement in the town of Dole, Jura, then the County's capital - the palais' site is now occupied by an 1883 covered market on Place Nationale.

== History ==
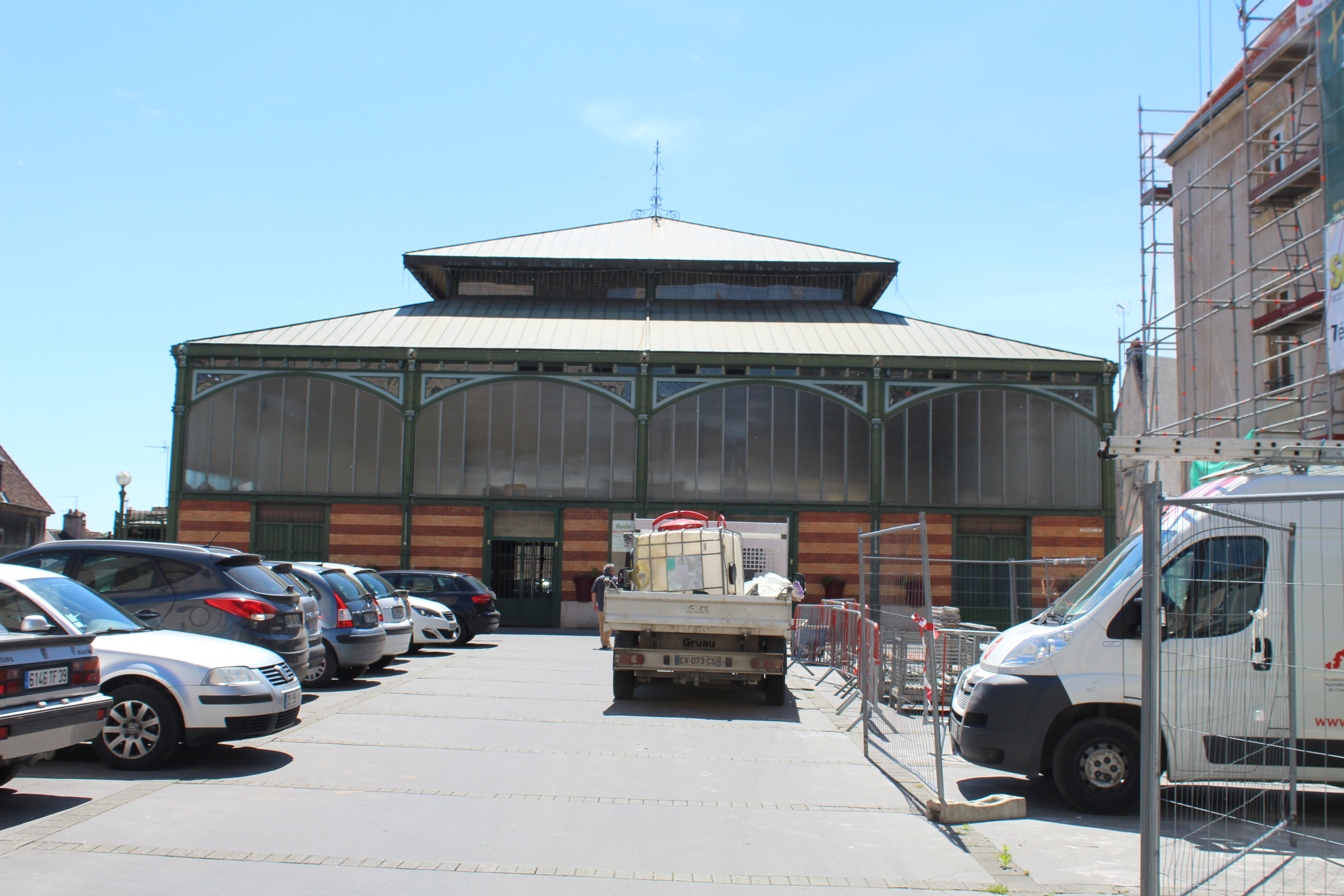
The palais' former site.

From 1377 onwards Margaret I, Countess of Burgundy then her son count Louis II of Flanders summoned a parliament for the County of Burgundy at Dole - it had previously moved from town to town. In 1386 Philip II, Duke of Burgundy fixed the Parliament's seat as Dole and confirmed it as the County's capital.

In 1408 John the Fearless took the advice of Guy Arménier, bailiff of the Bailiwick of Aval, to move the Parliament to Besançon, but fierce opposition from its president Richard de Chancey forced him to reverse the decision. His son Philip the Good began building the palais for the Parliament in 1420, opening it two years later before 1200 guests.

Louis XI of France sacked Dole - in 1479 the Parliament moved to Salins and in 1490 Charles VIII of France reestablished it. The Parliament was suppressed in 1668 by Louis XIV, who based governors of the County in Besançon, only for him to reestablish it in 1674 and move it finally to the County's new capital of Besançon in 1676.

== Functioning ==
=== Composition ===
It consisted of:

- one chancellor
- one president
- two knights
- eleven counsellors
- two fiscal lawyers
- a prosecutor general and a substitute for him
- a court clerk
- four huissiers
- two maîtres des requêtes

It was divided into two chambers.

=== Business ===
Most of its time was spent on trials. The parliamentary year lasted from 11 November (Martin of Tours's feast day) to 8 September (eve of the Nativity of the Virgin). It was divided up into four sessions, with a solemn closing ceremony for holidays and feast days. There were two audience days a week, Monday and Thursday.

There was a precise ceremonial ordering each day. Plenary sessions only took place for important judicial affairs or to discuss important political business.

=== Members ===
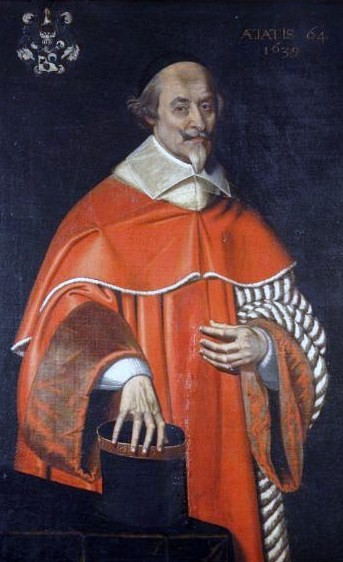
Jean Boyvin in the costume of President of the Parliament.

== Notable members ==
- Thomas de Plaine (1444-1506)
- Mercurino Gattinara (1465-1530)
- Jean Lallemand (1470-1560)
- Nicolas Perrenot de Granvelle (1486-1560)
- François Bonvalot (v1495-1560)
- Guillaume de Poupet (1506-1583)
- Louis Gollut (1535-1585)
- Ferdinand de Rye (1550-1636)
- Jean Grivel (1560-1624)
- Jean Boyvin (1575-1650)
- Jean Girardot de Nozeroy,(1580-1651)
- Antoine Brun, (1599-1654)
- Jules Chifflet, (1615-1676)
- Jean de Watteville (1618-1702)
- Augustin Nicolas (1622-1695)

== Presidents (1422 - 1676) ==
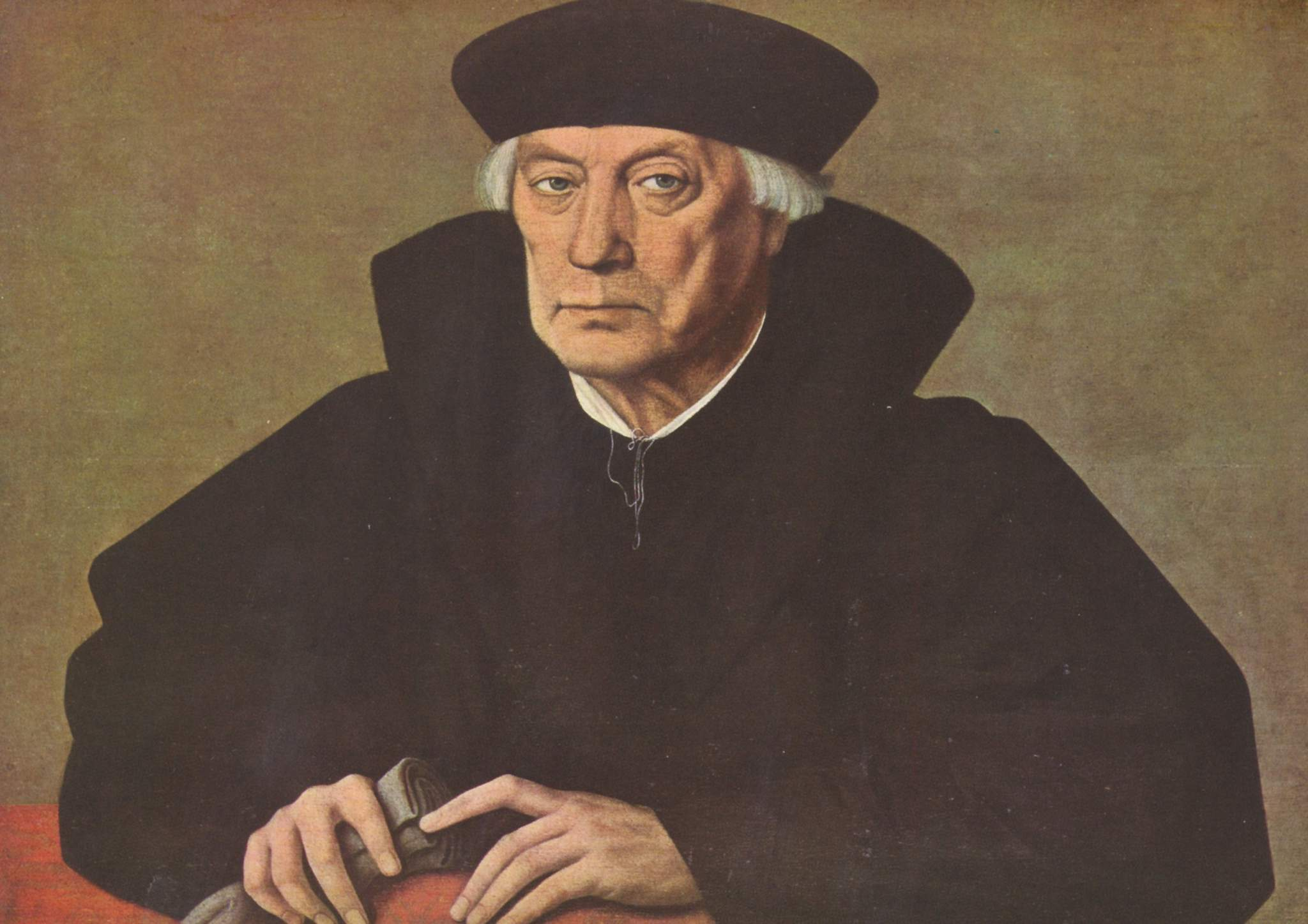
President Gattinara.

From 1422 to 1493 the Parliament of Dole was linked with that of Burgundy.

1. Gui Armenier (1422-1439)
2. Jean Armenier (1439-1453)
3. Etienne Armenier (1453-1454)
4. Gérard de Plaine (1454-1462)
5. Jean Jouard d'Eschevannes (1462-1477)
6. Jean Jacquelin (1477-1484)
7. Thomas de Plaine (1484-1493)
8. Jacques Buchot (1494-1498)
9. Jacques Gondrant (1498-1499)
10. Charles de la Porte (1500-1502)
11. Etienne de Thiard (1502-1507)
12. Mercurin d'Arbois de Gattinara (1508-1517)
13. Hugues Marmier (1517-1545)
14. Pierre des Barres (1545-1565)
15. Pierre Froissard de Seillières (1565-1575)
16. Claude Boutechoux (1576-1592)
17. Jean Froissard de Broissia (1592- 1595)
18. Claude Jacquinot (Janvier-septembre 1598)
19. Anatoile Galiot (1600-1604)
20. Jean-Adrien Thomassin (1605-1631)
21. Jean Boyvin (1639-1653)
22. Claude-François Lullier (1653-1660)
23. Antoine Michotey (1661-1664)
24. Jean-Jacques Bonvalot (1665-1667)
25. Claude Boyvin (17 au 25 juillet 1674)
26. Claude Jacquot par intérim (1674-1675)
27. Jean-Ferdinand Jobelot (1675-1676), last president, also first president of the Parliament of Besançon

From 1631 to 1639 there was no president and the parliament was suspended by Louis XIV and then Madrid from 1668 to 1674.

== Prosecutors General of the Parliament (1500-1676) ==
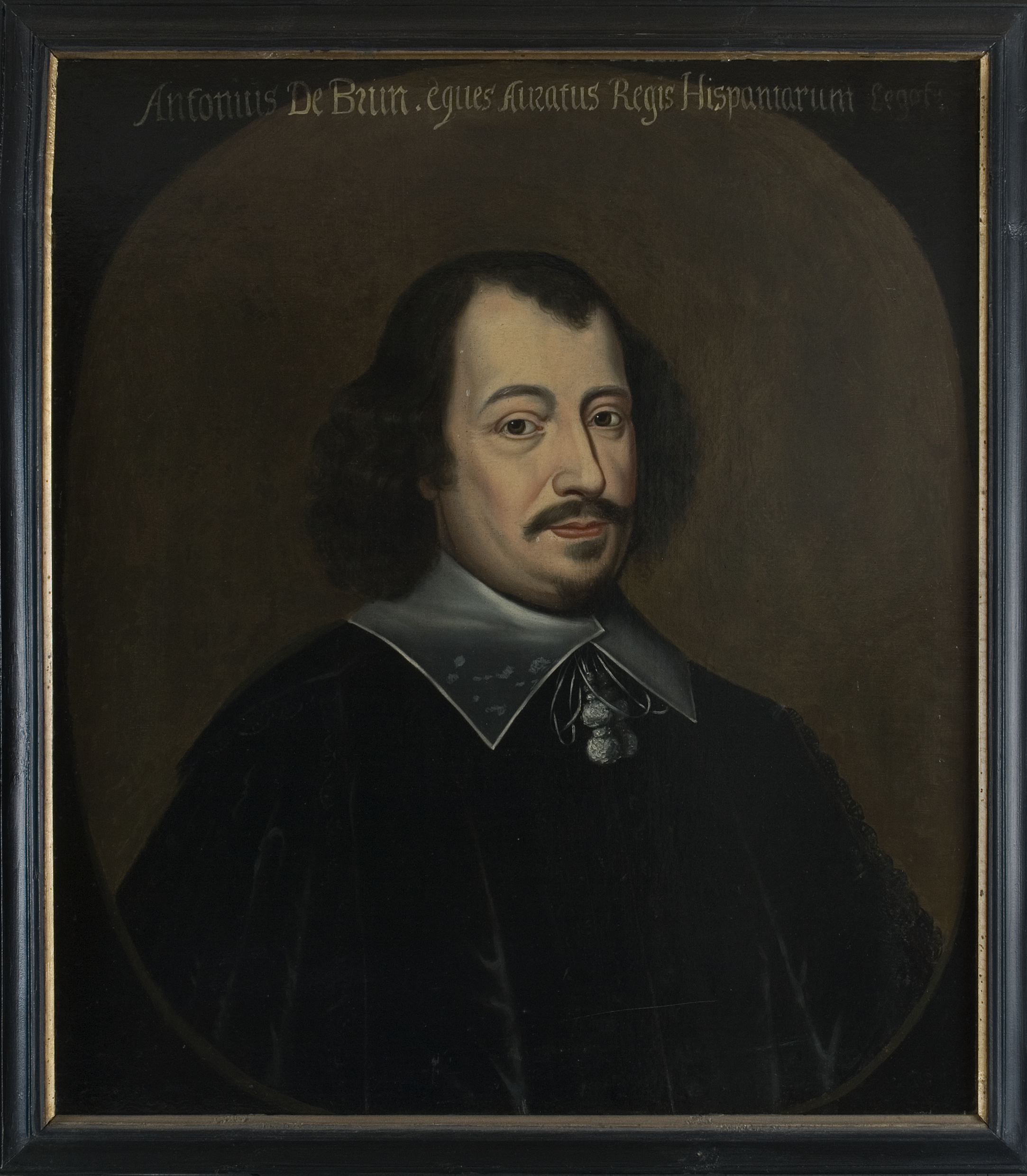
Antoine Brun

1. 1500 : Guillaume Thiebaud
2. 1508 : Pierre de Vers
3. 1530 : Guillaume de Boisset
4. 1540 : Marin Benoist
5. 1569 : Henri Camus
6. 1588 : Luc de Saint-Mauris d'Augerans
7. 1617 : Etienne Michotey
8. 1622 : François Mairot
9. 1627 : Claude Bassand
10. 1632 : Antoine Brun
11. 1646 : Jean-Simon Froissard
12. 1655 : Etienne Dagai
13. 1668 : Claude Reu

== Advocates-general of the Parliament (1500-1676) ==
- 1500 : Gui Gautiot
- 1500 : Nitier Patornay
- 1508 : Louis de Maranche
- 15?? : Jacques Boutechoux
- 15?? : Pierre des Barres
- 15?? : Jean Moine
- 15?? : Francois Drouot
- 1556 : Charles Grandjean
- 1556 : Guillaume de Saint-Maurice
- 1556-1569 : Ferdinand Seguin
- 15?? : Jean Chappuis
- 15?? : Nicolas Fauche
- 15?? : Jean Damondans
- 15?? : Claude Boutechoux
- 15?? : Odot Pierre
- 1570 : Pierre Froissard
- 157? : Anatoile Galiot
- 158? : Jean Grivel
- 1588 : Gilbert Le Jeune
- 1587 : Jacques Clémens
- 1591 : Jean de Menou
- 1595 : Claude Brun
- 1597 : Humbert Matherot
- 1605 : Pierre Galiot
- 1611 : Pierre Raclet
- 1605 : Antoine Berreur
- 1609 : Jean Boyvin
- 1611 : Jean-Baptiste Gollut
- 1619 : François Bigot
- 1619 : Philibert Froissard
- 1619 : Claude Toitot
- 1628 : Claude Garnier
- 1637 : Claude Matherot
- 1638 : Claude Grivel
- 1556 : Antoine Michotey
- 1641 : Claude-Antoine Buson de Champdivers
- 1644 : Nicolas Bouhelier
- 1646 : Jean-Jacques Bonvalot
- 1651 : Claude-Laurent de Maranche
- 1651 : Claude Boyvin
- 1653 : Jean-Ferdinand Jobelot
- 1655 : Claude-François Moréal
- 1660 : Claude-Ambroise Philippe
- 1664 : Jacques de Mesmay
- 1666 : Hugues Chaillot
- 1675 : Ferdinand Lampinet

== Parliamentary families ==
From 1386 to 1676 counsellors and presidents were provided by the major families of:

- Achey (d')
- Amondans (d')
- Arborio de Gattinara (olim Arbois)
- Barangier
- Barres (des)
- Bauffremont (de)
- Baulme-Montrevel (de LA)
- Belin Chasnée
- Benoît
- Bereur
- Bernard (d'Authume)
- Bigeot
- Boisset (de)
- Boitouset
- Bonnot
- Bonvalot de l'Étoile
- Bouhelier
- Bourrelier de Malpas
- Boutechoux de Chavanes
- Bouton (de Chamilly)
- Boyvin
- Briot
- Broch d'Hotelans
- Brun
- Buffot
- Buzon (de Champdivers)
- Camus (de Dole)
- Cecile
- Cervé
- Chaillot (de)
- Chalon
- Champ (du) (de Parthey & d'Assaut)
- Chap(p)uis (olim Chapuis, in Mesmay)
- Chaumont
- Chifflet
- Chupin
- Cise (de)
- Clément (d'Antorpe)
- Clerc (Le) (de Besançon)
- Clerc (de Neurey & de Francalmont)
- Clermont (de) (-Tonnerre)
- Colard
- Colin (de Valloreille)
- Courvoisier
- Dagay
- Denis
- Drouhot
- Duzin
- Emskerque (d')
- Fabri
- Faletans (de)
- Fauche de Domprel
- Florimond (de)
- Froissard de Bersaillin
- Froissard de Broissia
- Froment
- Gaillard
- Galliot
- Garnier de Faletans
- Gautiot (d'Ancier)
- Gillebert
- Girardot de Nozeroy
- Gollut
- Grammont (de)
- Grandjean
- Grivel (de)
- Grivelet
- Grusset
- Guillamier
- Guillet
- Hugon (d'Augicourt)
- Huot (d'Ambre)
- Jacquard (d'Annoires)
- Jacques
- Jaillon
- Jaquinot
- Jaquot d'Andelarre
- Jault
- Jeune (Le)
- Jobelot (de Montureux-les-Gray)
- Jouelle
- Laborey
- Lampinet
- La Porte (de)
- Lesmes (de)
- Loys
- Lulier
- Maire (Le) (de Poligny)
- Mantoche (de)
- Marenches (de)
- Mareschal (de Vezet, de Charentenay & de Sauvagney) (diff. Mesmay)
- Marmier (de)
- Matherot (de)
- Mathon
- Mayrot (de Mutigney)
- Menou (de)
- Merceret (de Mont)
- Mercey, voir Raclet (barons de Mercey)
- Mercier
- Mesmay (de)
- Meurgey
- Michotey
- Moine (Le)
- Monnier (de)
- Montfort-Taillant (de) (voir aussi Taillant de Montfort in Mesmay)
- Montfort-Ternier (de)
- Moréal
- Morel ((de))
- Mouchet de Battefort de Laubespin
- Moulin (du) (ou Dumoulin)
- Musy
- Oiselay (d')
- Patornay
- Pautelleret (Potelleret, AC de Gray)
- Perrenot (de Dole, in Mesmay) (voir aussi Pernot, de Vercel, in Mesmay)
- Perrenot de Grandvelle
- Perrin (de Saux)
- Pétremant
- Pétrey
- Philippe : Claude-Ambtroise Philippe (1614-1698) a été nommé premier président du parlement de Dole par le roi Charles II en récompense de ses services.
- Pierre
- Poitier (de)
- Poligny (de)
- Potots (des)
- Poutier de Saône
- Precipiano (de)
- Prevost (de Pelousey)
- Quingey (de)
- Raclet (barons de Mercey)
- Ramasson
- Reud
- Richard de Villersvaudey
- Richardot de Choisey
- Rosaret
- Sachault
- Saint-Maurice (de) (Montbarrey)
- Salives (de)
- Santans (de), voir aussi Terrier (-Santans)
- Seguin (de Jallerange)
- Sonnet (de)
- Terrier (-Santans)
- Thiard de Bissy
- Thiébaud
- Thomassin (de)
- Toitot (de)
- Tornand (ou Tornond)
- Tour-Jusseau (de LA)
- Tour-Saint-Quentin (Bourgeois de La)
- Tricornot (de)
- Valimbert (de)
- Vauchard
- Vaulchier (de)
- Veau (Le)
- Vienne (de)
- Vieux (Le)

== Bibliography (in French) ==
- George Bidalot, Comment les Francs-Comtois sont devenus Français, Éditions du Belvédère, Pontarlier, 2011.
- François Pernot, La Franche-Comté espagnole. À travers les archives de Simancas, une autre histoire des francs-Comtois et de leurs relations avec l'Espagne, de 1493 à 1678, Presses Universitaires de Franche-Comté, Besançon, 2003.
- Sylvain Pidoux de la Maluere, Les officiers au souverain parlement de Dole et leur famille, Paris, 1961.
- Jacky Theurot, 'Le Parlement de Dole, et son impact sur la vie urbaine (XIVe – XVe siècles)' in Mémoires de la société pour l'Histoire du Droit et des Institutions des anciens pays bourguignons, comtois et romans, Éditions Universitaires, Dijon, 1982, 39.
- François Ignace Dunod de Charnage, Mémoires pour servir à l'histoire du Comté de Bourgogne, Besançon, 1740
