= Jean-Charles de Watteville =

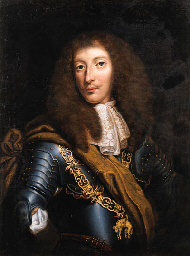

Jean Charles de Joux de Watteville, marquis de Batteville (1628 - 14 April 1699) was a Burgundian soldier in Spanish service who also served as a diplomat and Viceroy of Navarre for Philip IV of Spain.

== Family ==
He was born at the Château-Vilain in Bourg-de-Sirod into a noble family that had originated in Bern - it had moved to Burgundy after refusing to convert to Protestantism. It served the dukes of Savoy right from the start of the 17th century before returning to their feudal estates in Jura.

His father Philippe-Francois de Joux de Watteville, comte de Bussolin was one of the most talented Burgundian generals in the Ten Years' War, winning several battles in the Bugey. He died of plague at the 1637 Siege of Bletterans, defending it against the French.

Philippe-François's father Gérard de Watteville was commander in chief of the Burgundian troops from 1633 to 1637. An experienced officer, he served Savoy during the Franco-Savoyard War. The title of marquis of Conflans was first awarded to Gérard, who passed it to Jean-Charles. Jean-Charles was also nephew twice removed to baron Charles de Watteville, advisor to prince Philip of Spain and an experienced soldier - Jean-Charles was sometimes in contact with Charles whilst the former was ambassador to London.

== Life ==
=== Early career ===
He began his career in the baron de Clinchamps' cuirassier regiment, in which he was made a captain in 1649, upon the creation of one of the first cavalry tercios in the Spanish Netherlands. On 25 June 1653 he was made mestre de camp of the prince of Hesse-Hamburg's tercio, which later became the 'Farnese' cavalry regiment, one of the oldest surviving regiments in Europe. He commanded that regiment in 1656 at the Siege of Valenciennes, a victory over the French forces led by La Ferté and Turenne.

After the defeat in the Battle of the Dunes, Watteville fought in the Spanish Flanders Corps beside British royalists and a small corps of Frenchmen from the Fronde. He protected the future Charles II of England from capture by Oliver Cromwell's troops, but was himself captured by an Anglo-French force. He was able to pay his own ransom and commanded his tercio from then on until the close of hostilities in 1659.

In July 1660 he was sent to London as ambassador extraordinary to congratulate his former comrade Charles II on the Restoration. There Jean-Charles awaited the arrival of his uncle Charles de Watteville, who was sent to London on 7 September 1660 as Spanish ambassador to the British court. Jean-Charles was probably dismissed from his post before 1661, returning to Ostend in Flanders.

=== Back to the army ===
Jean-Charles was made marquis of Batteville and promoted to cavalry general in Flanders. ON 15 December 1667 he was promoted to sergeant-general and handed command of his tercio over to the count of Trauttmansdorf. Shortly afterwards he joined the counsel of war in Brussels and took on the company previously commanded by Francisco de Rye, marquis of Varembon, an elite heavy cavalry united only commanded by members of the most important noble families in Burgundy and the Spanish Netherlands.

In the ensuing Franco-Dutch War he was interim governor-general of the province of Namur (1674–1675) and Spanish governor of Luxembourg (1676). Charles II recognised his achievements in the former post by making him a knight of the Order of the Golden Fleece on 26 September 1675. Early in 1676 he planned and realised a daring raid into enemy territory, taking and sacking the town of Châtelet on 4 January before returning to Cambrai.

On 3 January 1678 he took command of the defence of Ypres, then under French siege. He was finally forced to surrender when he lost a counterscarp of the citadel to a night attack with mass incendiary projectile bombardment on 25 March that year. Cánovas del Castillo described his defence of the city two centuries later as "very honourable", but it formed the last chapter in Spanish domination of the city - it was ceded to France later in 1678 in the Treaty of Nijmegen.

=== Higher posts and death ===
From October 1681 to 1684 he was governor of the Kingdom of Galicia. In March 1684 he was summoned to Navarre to command the army there, with the rank of maestre de campo general. He supervised its march to Catalonia on 7 August, after which he temporarily took over the government of Navarre after the death of viceroy Ñigo de Velandia Arce y Arellano.

Later he was a military advisor at court, then supreme commander for the Catalonian campaign and - from 1689 onwards - war governor of the principality and commander of the army there. He also fought at the Battle of Torroella in 1694 and the fruitless siege of Palamós the following year. He was made viceroy of Navarre in March 1697 but his time in that post was short-lived, as he died in Pamplona as that city's governor in 1699.

== Marriage and issue ==
Jean-Charles married Desle de Beaufremont, daughter of Joashen de Beaufremont, marquis de Listenoy, and Marguerite de Rey. They had three children :

- Charles-Emmanuel (1656–1728), third marquis de Conflant, made a knight of the Order of the Golden Fleece on 1 December 1700, married Isabel-Teresa de Merode (died 1733), daughter of Ferdinand de Merode and Marie-Célestine de Longval.
- Jean-Charles (1657–1679), comte de Bussolin.
- Jean-Chrétien (1658–1725), marquis de Batteville; served in the French army, was made a Commander of the Order of Saint Louis.
