= Philippe-François de Bussolin =

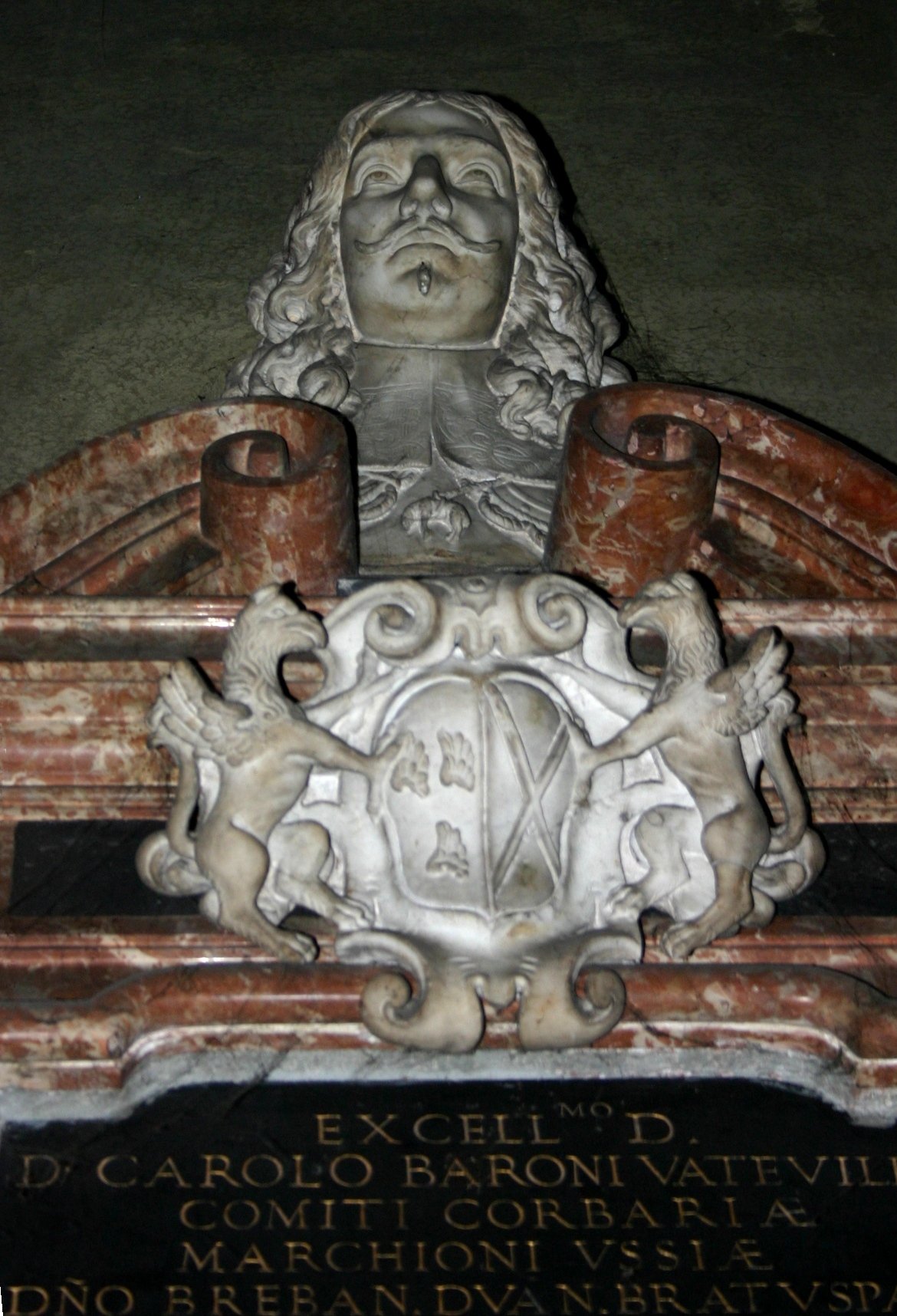
Bust of Jean-Charles de Watteville

Philippe-François de Joux de Watteville or François de Watteville (1601 - September 1637) was an aristocrat and general in the Ten Years' War, one of the County of Burgundy's main generals in that conflict. He was the count of Bussolin and is most notable for his success in the Bresse and Bugey campaign in January and February 1637 against the French, making him and his father Gérard de Watteville the county's only victorious generals during the War.

== Family ==
He was probably born in the Duchy of Savoy, to Gérard de Watteville and his wife Catherine de Boba. Gerard and his father were then stationed in that Duchy as generals in its army during the Franco-Savoyard War. The Wattevilles were a noble family originally from Bern which had settled in the Jura after refusing to convert to Protestantism, serving the Dukes of Savoy right from the start of the 17th century before moving back to their estate in the County of Burgundy.

== Life ==
=== The County's strategy ===
He was made a mestre de camp and in August 1636 was put in command of the county's contingent in a joint County-Imperial-Lorrainian force. This was sent to relieve the Siege of Dole.

After raising that siege, Bussolin's father put him in command of a County force of 3200 men sent into Bugey on a major offensive. The Parlement of Dole also authorised him to raise his own infantry regiment in the Saint-Claude sector in November 1636. Operations began on 15 January 1637, with colonel Henri de Champagne and captains d'Arnans and Duprel d'Arloz as Bussolin's subordinates. Jean Girardot de Nozeroy, a historian and politician from the county, called him "the valiant and fiery lord, hungry for glory".

Bussolin showed himself a shrewd strategist, taking several strongholds and town such as Oyonnax by surprise, as well as feinting attacks on other towns like Nantua to confuse the French. The French force in the Bugey was ordered to contain Bussolin but was never able to do so. He won a great victory at the Siege of Arbent, but he was unable to stop his troops carrying out massacres there and elsewhere, slightly tarnishing his image.

The campaign was a great victory but did not bring the hoped-for gains. The Parliament of Dole's strategy was systematically opposed to its own army and generals and did not send them the necessary reinforcements to hold the conquered territories. By early March almost all of the conquered lands had been lost.

=== Cornod ===
Bussolin convinced his father to attack the château de Cornod, a French enclave within the county, but again the Parliament did not send them reinforcements. This time Bussolin was put in command of all the county's infantry. His disagreement with baron de Boutavant, commander of the cavalry, who had not reconnoitred far enough ahead, had serious consequences for the battle - on the morning of the battle itself he and Bussolin had a duel.

The French were nearby and surprised the County force, opening the Battle of Cornod. Bussolin and his regiment had been ordered to hold the bridge over the Valouse, to the west of the county's battle line, but the first French attack took it. The County cavalry then unwisely charged the French, who broke up the charge and sowed panic in the county's ranks. As the county's army collapsed under pressure from the enemy infantry, Bussolin dismounted and charged at the head of his men with a pike. He and his father harangued their own men and exhorted them to hold out, but the disaster was total and the army decimated.

Bussolin was almost captured but that evening got back to his father at Orgelet. Bussolin's regiment had been almost completely annihilated and was sent back to barracks before being disbanded the following summer.

=== Bletterans and death ===
On 9 May the Parliament ordered Bussolin to defend the town of Bletterans, this time granting him the necessary men (1,000, including some Imperial troops), supplies and artillery (two artillery pieces). He also knew that the duc de Longueville planned "to attack the city soon with a much more powerful army".

Longueville made two failed attacks on the town in June and August but hesitating, knowing Bussolin to be a skilled commander who had well-prepared its defences. The garrison was then ravaged by plague, of which Bussolin died while the French were approaching the town.

== Marriage and issue ==
In 1627, at Bourg-de-Sirod, Philippe-Francois married Louise Christine de Nassau-Dillenbourg, daughter of John VII, Count of Nassau-Siegen and Marguerite, duchess of Holstein. They had five children:

- Thomas-Eugène de Watteville, cavalry captain, killed at the siege of Rethel
- Jean de Watteville, infantry captain in Spanish service, killed in Italy
- Jean-Charles de Watteville (1628–1699), ambassador for Spain, Knight of the Order of the Golden Fleece
- Anne-Désirée de Watteville, canoness of Le Mont, then married Jacques de Saint-Maurice, comte de Rosjean
- Marie de Watteville, abbesse of Château-Chalon from 1675, princess of the Holy Roman Empire, died 1700
