= Siege of Bletterans =

1637 series of battle during the Ten Years' War

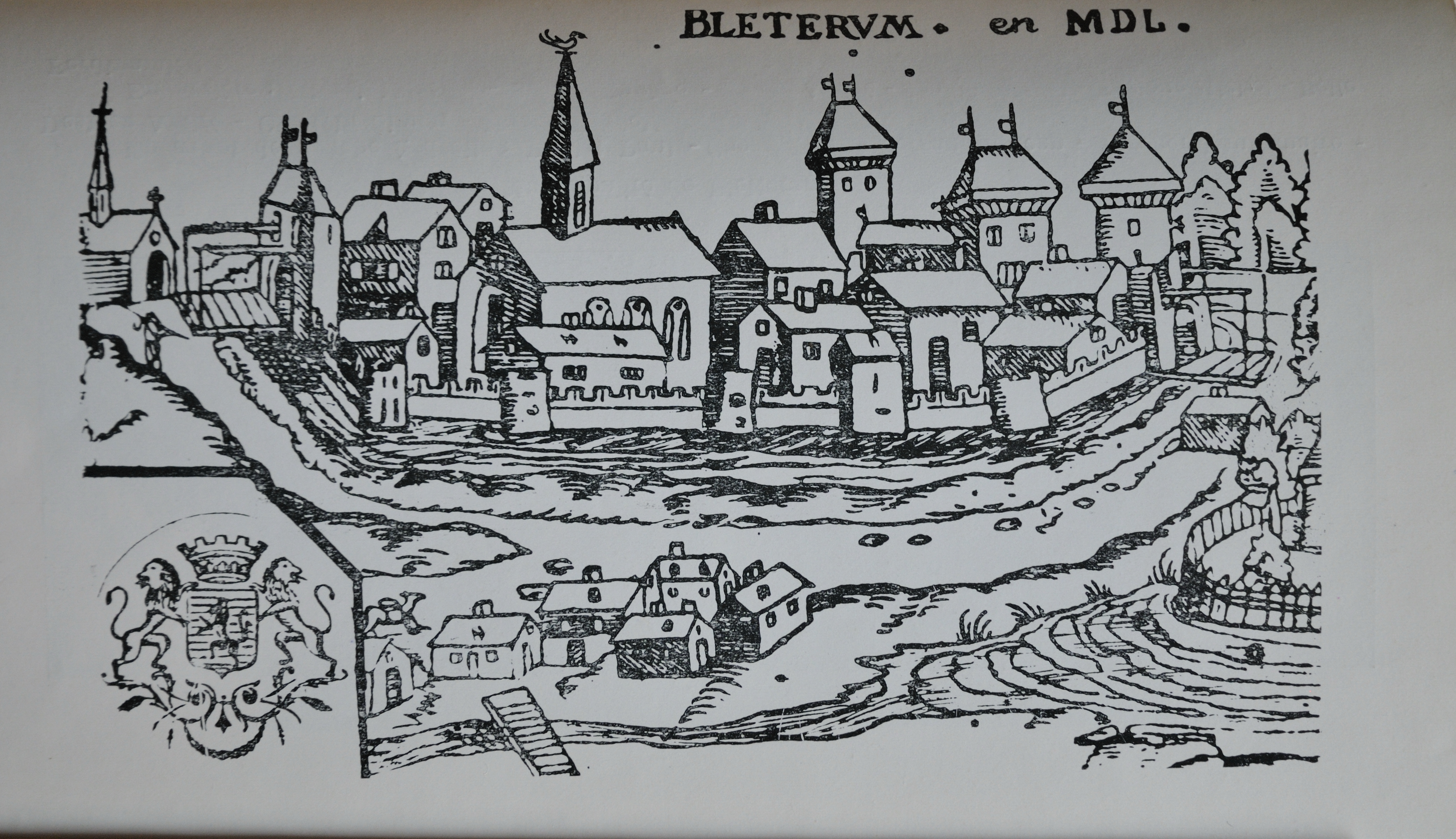
- Bletterans and its ramparts c. 1550 by Claude Luc
Date	26 June – 4 October 1637
Location	Bletterans (County of Burgundy)
Result	French strategic victory Bletterans captured

Belligerents
County of Burgundy; Holy Roman Empire; Duchy of Lorraine	Kingdom of France

Commanders and leaders
Philippe-François de Bussolin †; Claude de Visemal de Frontenay Peter von Warlowsky	Henri d'Orléans-Longueville; Jean-Baptiste Budes de Guébriant Gaspard de Coligny-Saligny

Strength
600 infantry 40 cavalry 2 cannon 240 infantry	8,000 infantry 2,000 cavalry Several pieces of artillery

Casualties and losses
Around 450 killed 15 prisoners	Unknown

The Siege of Bletterans was a series of battles and sieges between 26 June and 4 October 1637 in and around Bletterans during the Ten Years' War, itself part of the wider Thirty Years' War. Troops from the Franche-Comté under Philippe-François de Bussolin faced French ones under the duc de Longueville.

== Context ==
The Franche-Comté's army was beaten at Cornod on 13 March 1637 and by that summer it had almost ceased to exist. de Longueville's French force swept into the bailiwick of Aval, one of the three bailiwicks into which Franche-Comté was divided and now falling the department of Jura. The towns of Saint-Amour, Moirans, Saint-Claude, Lons-le-Saunier and Savigny had already fallen.

At this time Bletterans was an important strategic point in the defence of the Franche-Comté, guarding part of its border with France and preventing France taking northern Jura. Its governor was then captain Claude de Visemal, lord of Frontenay, but on 9 May he was replaced by the mestre de camp Philippe-François de Bussolin, one of the most experienced and battle-hardened Franche-Comté commanders in the conflict, who had won fame in the Bresse and Bugey campaign earlier in 1637. On 29 May lieutenant-colonel Peter von Warlowsky (sometimes spelled Wolosky or Valosqui) arrived with a force of 240 Imperial and Lorrainian troops—he was a Polish officer in the Imperial Army. Bussolin began repairing the town's fortifications and Gérard de Watteville sent him an engineer for that very purpose.

== Course ==
=== First attempts (26 June-2 July and 12 August) ===
On 26 June Longueville and part of his force arrived outside the town, having come from the ongoing siege of Lons-le-Saunier. He reconnoitred Bletterans' surroundings and began preparing to besiege it, but Bussolin immediately ordered daily attacks on the French force and so the latter were unable to begin a siege. On 2 July Longueville abandoned the town and temporarily left the area. The Franche-Comté commander awaited a new attack and so decided to reorganise his defences in depth, razing the town's suburbs and clearing the space in front of the ramparts. On 25 July the Parlement of Dole sent him two cannon and 1600 livres of gunpowder.

On 12 August de Guebriant launched a diversionary attack on peasants in the outskirts of the town, hoping to tempt out the garrison and attack them in the open. This trick did not work and the French soldiers attacked the villages of Jousseaux and Cosges in revenge. At the end of the day de Guebriant tried another attack on peasants and cattle north of the town and this time a detachment from the garrison sortied to protect them. The detachment was ambushed in the Vallières wood and lost fifteen prisoners and seventy killed, whilst thirty of the peasants were also captured. Despite this success Longueville still hesitated to begin a siege—he held Bussolin in high esteem and feared he would successfully defend the town, whilst the loss to the garrison was not significant.

=== Siege (25 September-5 October) ===
Plague broke out in the town, leaving many dead, and around 20 September Bussolin died of it. Captain de Visemal was also sick and learned that the Duke of Lorraine's force was leaving its positions nearby. Longueville also remained nearby and finally gave the order to move on the town and begin the siege. On 25 September the town was encircled and the artillery put in position badly after fierce resistance from the garrison.

Every day the Franche-Comté garrison harassed the French positions, with the latter taking five days to begin the siege in earnest by firing their artillery. On 30 September the village was heavily bombarded. During the day the French opened a large breech but advanced into it remained dangerous, as the ditches were filled with thick mud from which it was impossible to get out alive. After trying to bridge the ditch, the French ventured into the breach and a four-hour hand-to-hand battle ensued in which Wolosky heroically held his position and blocked the French from entering the town.

The French artillery continued to pound defenders remaining in the breach, forcing them to retreat into the town behind the barricades. The French infantry charged again and this time the garrison panicked, fleeing in disorder into the castle. Those who did not reach the castle were massacred, whilst the town was captured and partly burned down. The French immediately besieged the castle but their artillery could not come into action against it until 2 October, leaving a few days for the remainder of the garrison to regroup and recover and for Visemal to send a message asking for reinforcements, though he received no reply. Even so, a force was sent to break Visemal's force out of the castle, but arrived a few hours too late.

The French artillery was placed too close to the castle walls and so when it opened fire it came under counter-fire from the castle, with around fifty French gunners killed and their guns devastated. On 3 October the French dug in another battery to fire on the castle roof, since their previous efforts had been unable to breach its walls. At 4pm two towers were destroyed and the following day fire continued with renewed vigour. The weary count of Saligny then demanded surrender—after negotiations this was accepted and fighting stopped at the end of the day. On 5 October the garrison left the town escorted by 1500 French cavalry as far as the town of Dole, where it took refuge.

== Results ==
The siege's end left the Franche-Comté almost undefended. The French razed the castle and its fortifications and pillaged the town. Longueville succeeded in his objectives—all the western Jura outside Dole and Poligny fell into his hands. The army of the Franche-Comté was also reduced to a small core of men within the allied army and no longer had any say in the conduct of the war.

== Controversies ==
According to the contemporary historian Jean Girdardot de Nozeroy the town fell thanks to being betrayed by the engineer in charge of rebuilding its ramparts and by some middle-class inhabitants of the town. Jean-Baptiste de Visemal's wife was also suspected of dealing with the French and of intercepting messages meant for her husband.
