= Gérard de Watteville =

Gérard de Joux de Watteville, marquis de Conflans (1575 - 16 October 1637) was a diplomat and soldier from the County of Burgundy who served in the armies of the Duchy of Savoy and the Holy Roman Empire. He was known as the commander-in-chief of the County's forces from 1632 to 1637 during the Ten Years' War, part of the Thirty Years' War.

== Family ==
He came from a noble family that had originated in Bern, but emigrated after refusing to convert to Protestantism and settled in the county of Burgundy. He was a son of Nicolas de Watteville and Anne de Gramont de Joux, from whom he inherited the lordship of Joux. Nicolas de Watteville (1544–1610) left Bern and chose Catholicism to marry Anne de Joux (daughter of Adrien de Grammont) before settling in Chateauvilain near Bourg-de-Sirod, becoming its sole lord by buying the rights from the family of Anne de Poupet. He became a gentleman of the household to the King of Spain, then ruler of the Franche-Comté, and had three children - Gérard de Watteville de Joux, Charles-Emmanuel de Watteville and Pierre de Watteville (1571? -1632).

== Life ==
=== Early career in Savoy ===
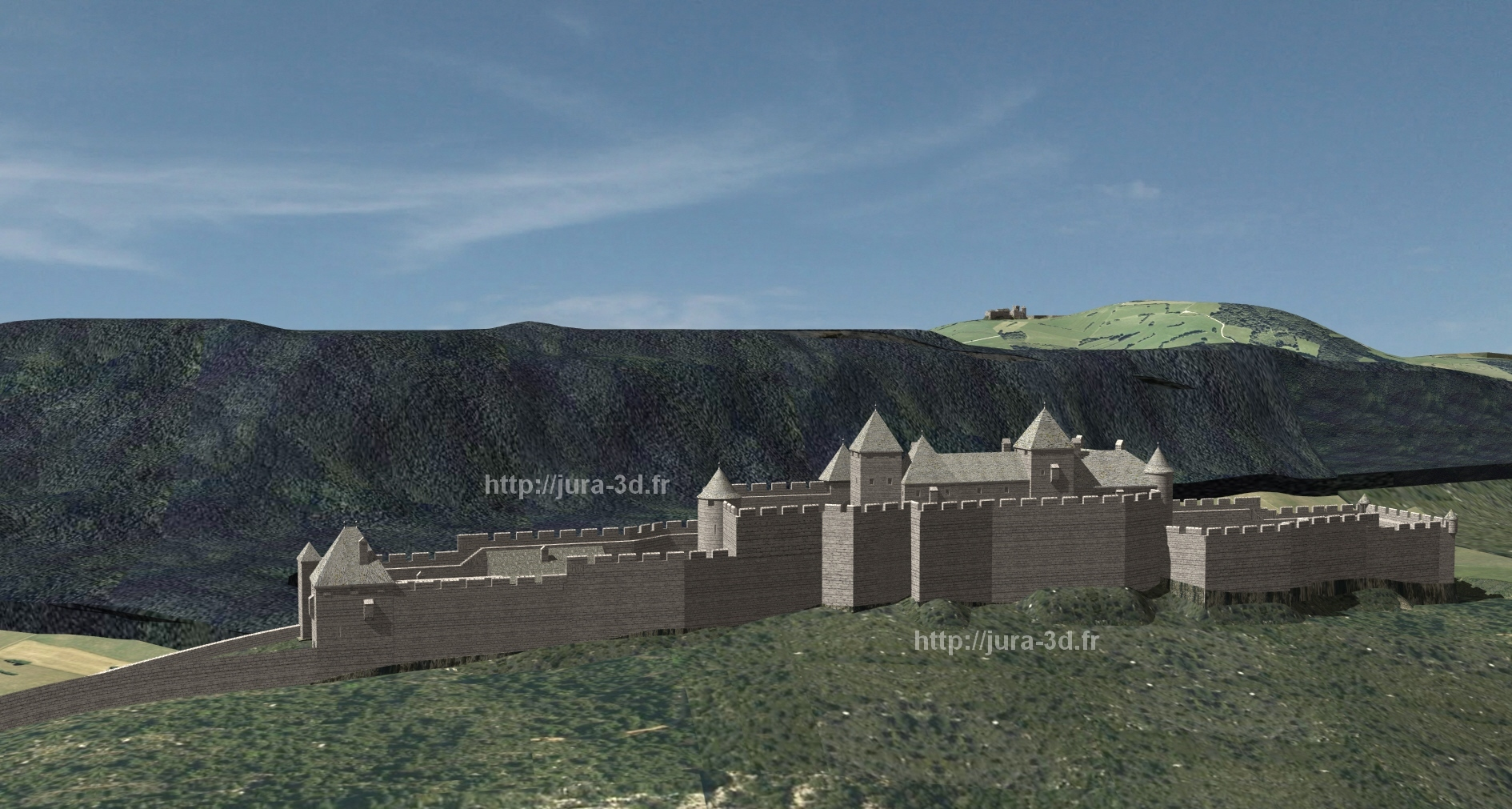
Reconstruction of the château des Watteville in Bourg de Sirod.

Little is known on de Watteville's youth, other than that he had difficulty being recognised as marquis of Versoix. He appealed to the cour des comptes of Dijon and the Parliament of Paris so that the king of France would maintain and preserve the sales and alienations by the Duchy of Savoy.

He joined Charles Emmanuel I's army as a cavalry general and distinguished himself in the Franco-Savoyard War by raising the siege of Bourg-en-Bresse and by his part in the reconquest of the Maurienne. He was rewarded by being made a marshal. In 1627 he became Victor Amadeus I's ambassador to Ferdinand II, Holy Roman Emperor. He fell into disgrace in 1631 and was dismissed from his posts, returning to his estate in the county of Burgundy.

=== Commander in chief ===
In 1632 Ferdinand II summoned Watteville, confirmed him in his rank, made him "Governor of the Comté Armies", and simultaneously made Jean Girardot de Nozeroy "intendant" of the Armies as Watteville's assistant. The role of Governor of the Armies was usually fulfilled by the governor of the Comté - this was the only time that the two functions were split and it caused difficulties for him and opposition from the County authorities.mais aussi de la noblesse comtoise qui ne le considèrent pas comme un des leurs However, he was very quickly able to build a new army, recruiting quickly and mounting several garrisons. At the same time he was made bailiff of the Bailiwick of Aval (now the Jura department).

Nozeroy and Watteville shared a strategic vision of not directly confronting the large enemy forces in open battle, but instead defending strongholds from which they could launch specific and targeted offensives. Together they were able to repulse Swedish attacks on the Lure and to fortify the County's borders from 1633 to 1635. He was even in a position to destroy all the enemy forces in the Lure sector, something which could have changed the course of the war, but governor Ferdinand de Rye wished to calm the situation in the sector and stopped him from doing so.

In 1633, Watteville made Henry de Champagne the second in command of the Comté army - he was a well-tried officer highly-respected by his men. While Watteville managed to form an army of 8000 from almost nothing, the French force menacing from the west of the Comté was three times bigger and better equipped. Half of the County's army was divided between garrisons defending large towns such as Gray, Besançon and especially Dole. When Dole was besieged in May 1636 Watteville held back, relying on the fighting spirit of Dole's existing garrison, then marched the County's army to join up with the Imperial and Lorrainian forces which were on their way to relieve Dole. Just before the Allied army arrived the French lifted the siege in August and peace temporarily returned to the Comté.

=== Victory and defeat ===
Watteville wanted to use this respite to launch major offensives in Bresse and Bugey and so entrusted his son Philippe-François de Bussolin to attack the Bugey with a force of 3,000 men. In the meantime Watteville launched a smaller-scale offensive in Bresse, capturing the strongly-defended Cuiseaux and shocking the French forces. These offensives occurred from mid January to early March 1637.

A few days later he won the Battle of Savigny in a largely unfavourable context. The offensives were major victories and the only major offensive of the Ten Years' War. However, they proved the end of the County's successes, since they had to evacuate most of the towns and territories they had conquered as they did not have enough men to garrison them. The parliament systematically opposed the marquis de Conflans and refused his requests for reinforcements. Several French counter-attacks on Jura also diminished the significance of the victory in Bugey.

Watteville sought to make a strong strike and left to attack the château de Cornod, against the advice of the Parliament of Dole, particularly Jean Boyvin. The French army was nearby and attacked the County's forces at the start of the siege and soundly defeated them. The County's forces never recovered. Watteville was heavily criticised for his conduct during the battle, several sources stating he was absent and detached from events, not even intervening to stop the duel between his son and the baron de Boutavent.

=== Ruin and death ===
The defeat allowed the French to invade the Jura and besiege Saint-Amour. Watteville wanted to come to its aid and managed to regroup what was left of his army, scattered across the mountains. He set off and learned that he was to receive 1000 cavalry reinforcements from the duke of Lorraine. Their rendezvous point was set to be Sainte-Agnès, but the French got wind of it, sent a detachment and met them there in a fiercely-contested battle there. Its result was unclear and so Watteville preferred caution, refusing to aid the besieged town. He instead marched to Château-Chalon to meet the governor Jean-Baptiste de la Baume-Montrevel.

On arrival he was dismissed from his role as commander-in-chief due to pressure from the County's nobility, who rejected Watteville's authority, but remained in post in the army. However, time passed and the County's army remained where it was and did not intervene. Watteville wrote in one of his letters "I am in retirement here. I have been forced into this not for fear of the enemy but by famine, horses and their riders are dying of hunger. As for the rest, I am all alone, without money, without grain, without munitions".

He continued fighting for a few months beside the governor and also still acted as bailiff of the Bailiwick of Aval. Misused and scorned, he was finally sent to lead the garrison at Salins-les-Bains. Embittered by such ingratitude, he fiercely hated the members of the Parliament right up until his death from plague in Salins, calling them "laughers who stay at home and mock those who work".

== Issue ==
Gérard de Watteville was the father of:

- Philippe-Francois de Watteville, comte de Bussolin (c. 1600 - 1637), mestre de camp, head of the County's expeditionary corps during the victorious Bugey campaign, commanded an infantry regiment at the Battle of Cornod

He was also the uncle of:

- Charles de Watteville (1605–1670), diplomat and soldier in the Spanish Army
- Jean de Watteville (1618–1702), soldier and ecclesiastic

== Bibliography ==
- (in French) Émile Longin, La dernière campagne du Marquis de Conflans, Besançon, 1896

== References (in French) ==
New title	Commander in chief of the army of the County of Burgundy; 1632-1637	Succeeded by Jean-Baptiste de la Baume-Montrevel
