= Battle of Savigny =

1637 battle of the Ten Years' War

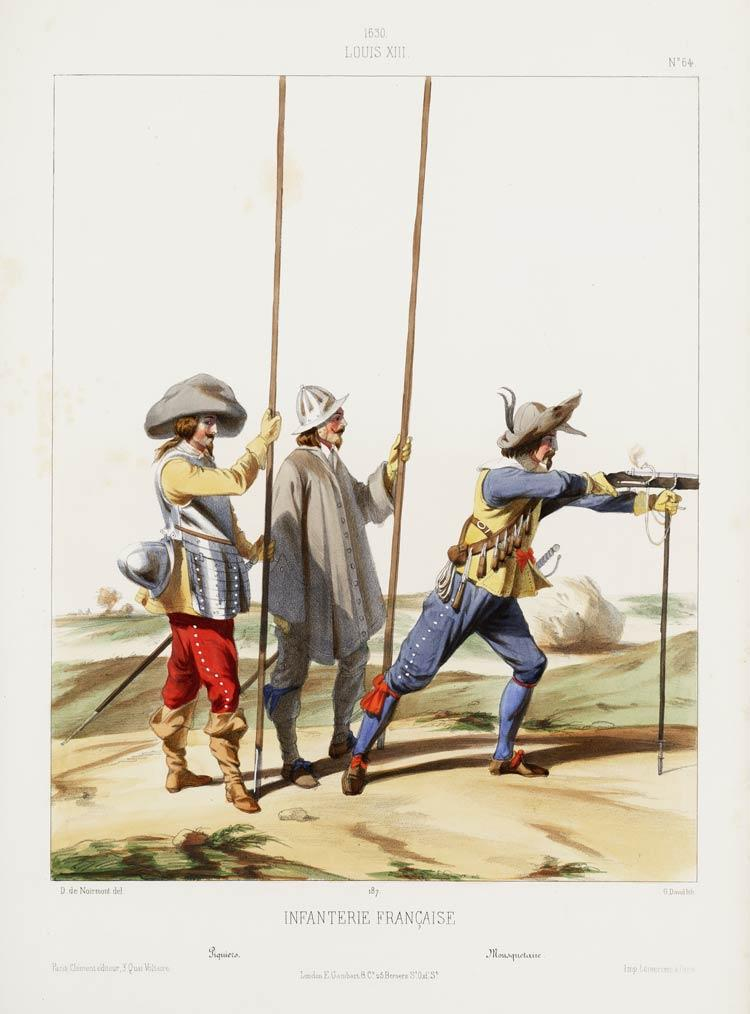
Date	8–9 February, 1637
Location	Savigny (County of Burgundy)
Result	Burgundian Victory

Belligerents
County of Burgundy; Spanish Empire	France

Commanders and leaders
Gérard de Watteville; Christophe de Raincourt; Marc de Montaigu	Pierre de Grosbois

Strength
600 infantry 250 cavalry 2 cannon	600-700 infantry 50 cavalry 1 cannon

The Battle of Savigny was a battle on 8–9 February 1637 as part of the Bresse and Bugey campaign of the Ten Years' War, itself part of the Thirty Years' War. That campaign was an offensive launched by the County of Burgundy. The County forces in the battle were led Gérard de Watteville, opposing a French garrison led by Pierre de Ténarre de Grosbois. It and the Siege of Dole were the County's biggest victories during the conflict.

== Context ==
In autumn 1636 Gérard de Watteville, marquis de Conflans and supreme commander of the County's army, prepared an offensive into France to re-take the initiative. His plan was finalised in December that year, of two major offensives simultaneously in Bresse and Bugey. Its concept was simple, with both offensives being carried out by a single army, sometimes attacking Bresse and sometimes Bugey, so as not to split the County's forces. Watteville led the Bresse offensive while his son the comte de Bussolin commanded that against Bugey. Watteville managed to raise a force of more than 3000 men.

The Bresse offensive began on 22 January with the capture of Cuiseaux and several French settlements were captured in the following days. However, Watteville's aim was to capture the town of Louhans and to do so he would first have to take the significant town of Savigny with its powerful castle and garrison of many hundreds. The weather delayed this attack and the County's authorities were unenthusiastic about it, believing Savigny had been too strongly reinforced to be captured. The planned offensive had indeed become public knowledge and so Savigny had several days to prepare.

== Battle ==
=== Skirmish at Condamine ===
On the morning of 8 February Watteville and his army left Lons-le-Saunier accompanied by a representative from the Parlement of Dole, Antoine Brun. A first skirmish with a company of French musketeers and villagers at Condamine, using a mill on the Vallière as a strongpoint to block the County forces' advance. The County's forces took the mill by assault and quickly put the enemy to flight. Brun executed the villagers who had taken up arms.

== Bibliography (in French) ==
- Émile Longin: La dernière campagne du Marquis de Conflans, Besançon, 1896
