= De Watteville =

de Watteville is a surname. Notable people with the surname include:

- Charles de Watteville (1605–1670), French noble in the service of the Spanish Monarchy
- Jean de Watteville (1618–1702), French noble
- Louis de Watteville (1776–1836), Swiss mercenary
- Vivienne de Watteville (1900–1957), British travel writer
