= Battle of Bordeaux =

The Battle of Bordeaux may refer to:

- Battle of Bordeaux (732)
- Battle of Bordeaux (1653)
- Battle of Bordeaux (1938 FIFA World Cup)
