= Treaty of Lyon =

The Treaty of Lyon may refer to:

- The Treaty of Lyon (1504), in which Louis XII of France cedes Naples to Ferdinand II of Aragon
- The Treaty of Lyon (1601), in which Henry IV of France cedes Saluzzo to Savoy in exchange for Bresse, Bugey, Valromey, and Gex
