= Siege of Lons-le-Saunier =

1637 siege during the Ten Years' War

- Part of the Thirty Years' War
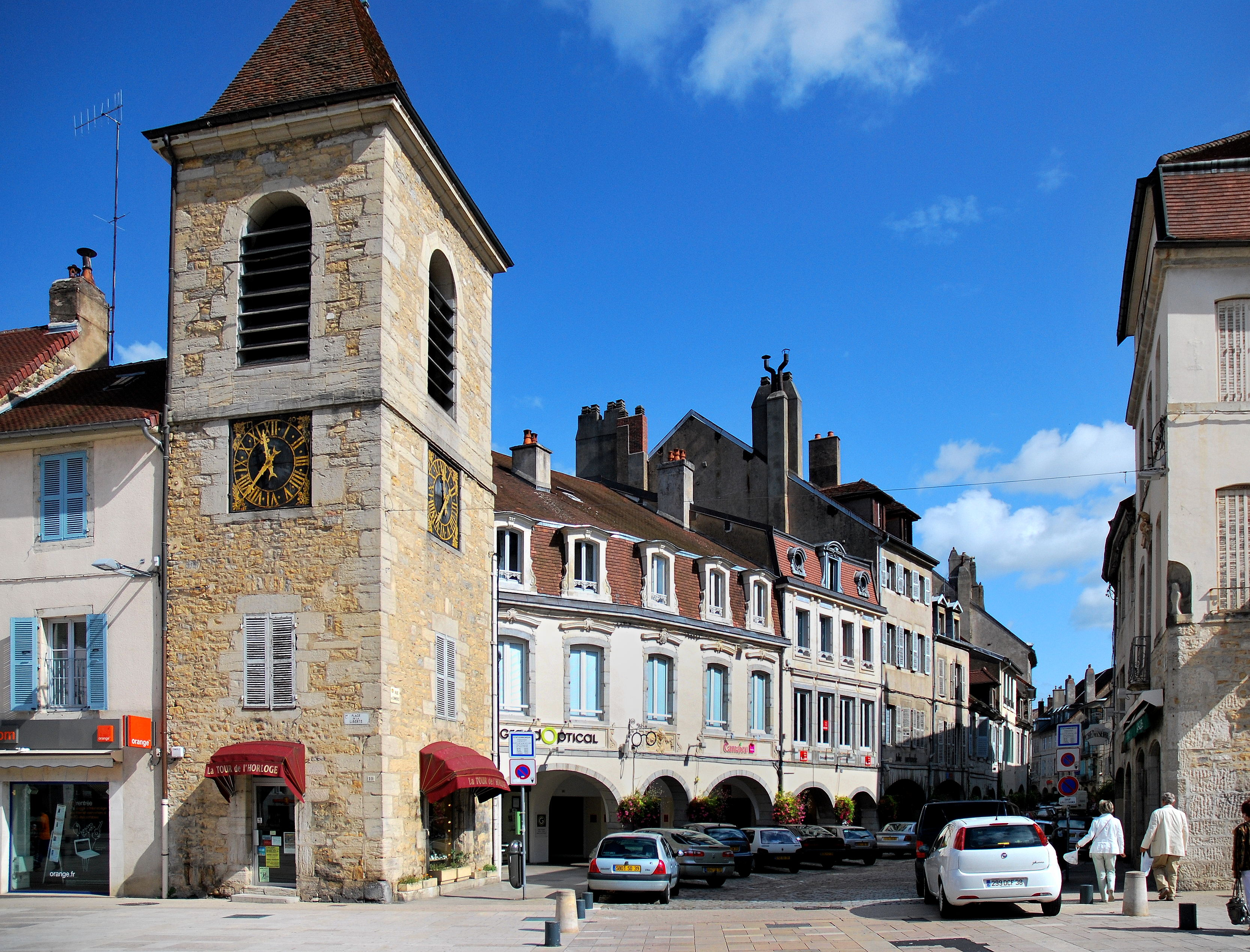
Date	c. 4 June – 2 July 1637
Location	Lons-le-Saunier, County of Burgundy 46.6752777778°N 5.55444444444°E
Result	French victory

Belligerents
County of Burgundy	Kingdom of France

Commanders and leaders
Christophe de Raincourt	(Kingdom of France) Henri d'Orléans-Longueville; (Kingdom of France) Louis d'Arpajon; (Kingdom of France) Philippe de Chaumont-Quitry

Strength
About 700 men 800 militiamen Some artillery pieces	About 10,000 men

Casualties and losses
Military: unknown Civilian: 200	Unknown

The Siege of Lons-le-Saunier was a siege that took place from around 4 June to 2 July 1637 during the Ten Years' War, the Franche-Comté episode of the Thirty Years' War. It opposed the French troops of the Duke of Longueville to the Comtois regiment of Christophe de Raincourt and ended in a French victory.

== Background ==
At the beginning of the summer of 1637, the County of Burgundy, and more particularly the bailliage of Aval, corresponding to the present-day Jura, was crossed by the army of the Duke of Longueville, which had already taken Saint-Amour, Moirans-en-Montagne, Saint-Claude and Savigny-en-Revermont. The Comtois army, defeated at Cornod in March, was now scattered in most of the towns and fortified places and was unable to oppose him. Longueville had already considered taking Lons-le-Saunier in March of the same year, but a strong Comtois army had taken position there.

This time, the town was defended only by a single regiment commanded by the mestre de camp Christophe de Raincourt, who had distinguished himself during the Bresse campaign, particularly at the Battle of Savigny. About 200 volunteer militiamen from the bourgeoisie of Lons supported him. De Raincourt had been appointed governor of the town on 17 March. The Marquis of Saint-Martin had sent him several artillery pieces from Poligny. However, faced with the disproportionate size of the enemy forces, he quickly understood that he would not be able to hold the town.

== Siege ==
Around 4 June, French troops appeared before Lons and laid siege to the town. Raincourt and his men held firm, repelling repeated French assaults for more than two weeks, with relatively little food and ammunition. The town walls were hit by numerous artillery shots.

On 25 June, the French succeeded in opening three breaches in the walls, which were then in a very poor condition. To stop the French advance, the Comtois commander set fire to the suburb of Saint-Désiré, which had already been evacuated by its inhabitants. A violent wind, however, spread the fire to the rest of the town. Lons was largely destroyed and more than 200 inhabitants died in the flames.

The townspeople, frightened and blinded by the smoke, no longer knew where to go. French troops then entered the town, pillaging and sacking what had not yet burned. Many rapes, sometimes in the presence of husbands and fathers, were reported.

Meanwhile, de Raincourt and his men withdrew into the old castle of Lons, which no longer had either floors or a roof.

They held out for another eight days under artillery fire before surrendering for lack of food and ammunition. The French granted them the honours of war, and they left Lons with weapons and drums beating. Raincourt and his men were nevertheless ultimately captured and sent to detention at Perpignan.

== Aftermath ==
The town was almost entirely destroyed and the castle was dismantled by the French. Lons remained deserted for four years. Its inhabitants lived in nearby caves, particularly at Revigny. It was only in 1641 that the first inhabitants returned to rebuild and settle in the town, notably under the protection of Captain Lacuzon.
