= Ten Years' War (Franche-Comté) =

Conflict in western Europe (1634–1644)

- Part of the Thirty Years’ War
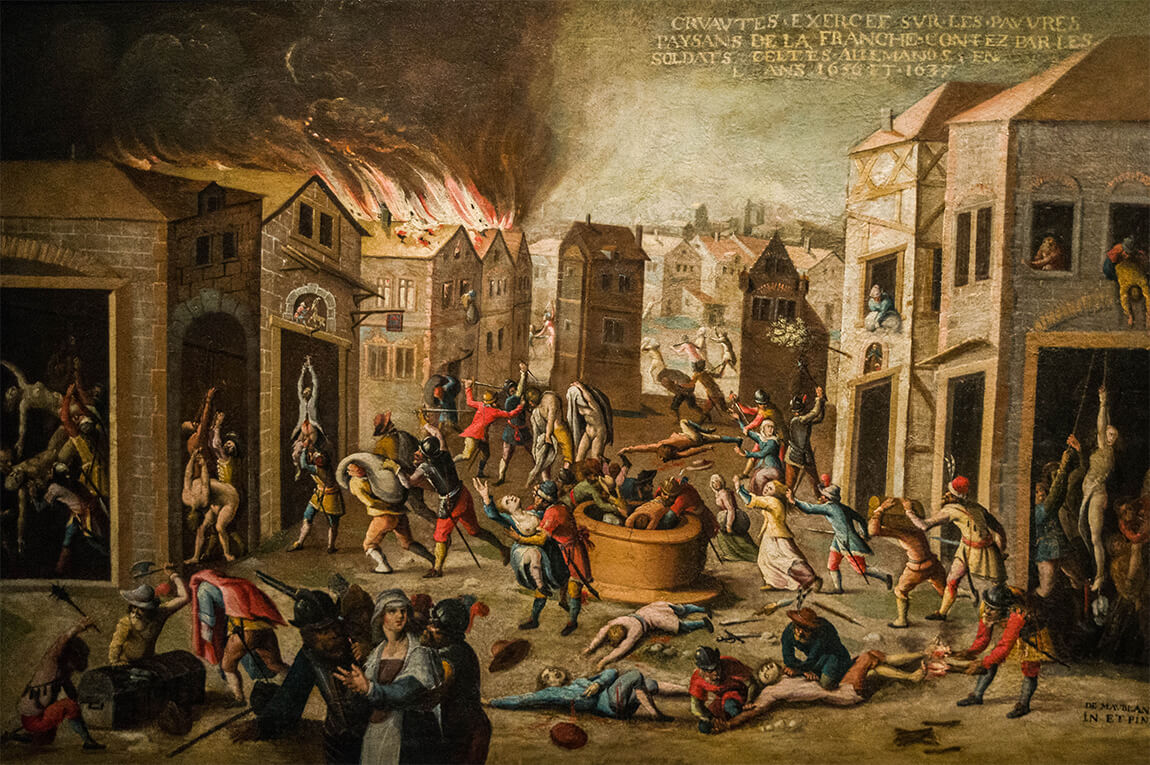
- Illustration of a massacre at the Musée du Temps, Besançon by Pierre Maublanc, c. 1636-1637
Date	1634–1644
Location	Franche-Comté, France, and Lorraine
Result	See § Aftermath
Territorial changes	Status quo ante bellum

Belligerents
Kingdom of France; Swedish Empire; Weimar Army	Spanish Empire; Holy Roman Empire; Duchy of Lorraine; Electorate of Bavaria

Commanders and leaders
(Kingdom of France) Louis XIII (Kingdom of France) Cardinal Richelieu (Kingdom of France) Grand Condé (Kingdom of France) Henri Turenne (Kingdom of France) Henri de Bourbon-Condé (Kingdom of France) Jean-Baptiste de Guébriant (Kingdom of France) Henri d'Orléans-Longueville (Kingdom of France) Jacques de Grancey (Kingdom of France) Charles de Villeroy (Kingdom of France) Louis d'Arpajon (Kingdom of France) Philippe de La Mothe-Houdancourt (Kingdom of France) Isaac de Feuquieres (Swedish Empire) Rheingrave Otto Ludwig (Swedish Empire) Bernard of Saxe-Weimar	(Spain) Philip IV (Spain) Cardinal-Infante Ferdinand (Spain) Watteville † (Spain) Lacuzon (Spanish Empire) Louis de La Verne (Spanish Empire) Baume-Montrevel † (Spanish Empire) Philippe de Bossolin † (Holy Roman Empire) Ferdinand III (Holy Roman Empire) Franz von Mercy (Holy Roman Empire) Matthias Gallas (Duchy of Lorraine) Charles de Lorraine (Electorate of Bavaria) Maximilian of Bavaria

Strength
(Kingdom of France) 26,000 (Swedish Empire) 9,000	(Spanish Empire) 18,100 (Holy Roman Empire) 20,000 (Note: In Alsace) (Lorraine) 8,000

Casualties and losses
High (Note: 270,000 civilians)	High (Note: Less than the French)

The Ten Years' War (1634–1644) was a European Conflict fought between the Franco-Swedish Army and the Burgundian-Allied Army, and was one of the most destructive wars to involve the County of Burgundy—270,000 Burgundian civilians and tens of thousands of military personnel died. The war is also related to the Thirty Years' War, of which it formed part, Franco-Spanish War (1635-1659), and the reconqest of Lorraine by Duke Charles IV.

== Situation in the Franche-Comté ==
During the reign of Holy Roman Emperor Charles V in the 16th century, Franche-Comté (County of Burgundy) was a prosperous region sheltered from the disputes between France and Spain, as well as Austria, thanks to its special status guaranteed in various neutrality treaties with neighboring Swiss cantons.

After the abdication of Charles V, Philip II became King of Spain and Count of Burgundy. He then engaged in a fight against Protestantism, which was spreading in Franche-Comté, close to both Switzerland and the County of Montbéliard.

The Parlement of Dole, strongly supported by Philip II, contributed to the success of the Catholic cause and spared Franche-Comté the troubles of the Wars of Religion that France had experienced for more than thirty years. However, the region was not spared from war. On January 17, 1595, Henry IV, then King of France, declared war on Spain. France was victorious over the Spanish at Fontaine-Française (in the Duchy of Burgundy). During the month of June 1595, the region was invaded by Henry IV himself, who ignored the regional neutrality treaties.

Several towns and villages were then mistreated, with Baume-les-Dames and Lons-le-Saunier forced to pay enormous sums or face devastation. But Henry IV, fearing that the Swiss would intervene to enforce the neutrality treaties, decided to leave Lons-le-Saunier quickly, burning its two suburbs along the way.

In 1598, the Peace of Vervins was signed, restoring France and Spain's mutual conquests. That same year, Philip II died; he left the Netherlands and Franche-Comté to his eldest daughter, Infanta Isabella Clara Eugenia of Austria, wife of Archduke Albert of Austria.

== Context ==
In 1611, Isabella Clara Eugenia of Austria renewed the neutrality pact of 1522 between France and Franche-Comté by Archduchess Margaret of Austria. The pact clearly stated that neutrality was to be observed at least until 1640. A short-term respite was then granted to Franche-Comté, under the rule of Archduke Albert of Austria and Isabella Clara Eugenia of Austria.

In 1621, Archduke Albert of Austria died, and at the same time, his nephew Philip IV of Spain acceded to the throne of Spain. Isabella Clara Eugenia of Austria died fourteen years later, leaving Franche-Comté to Philip IV. Meanwhile, in January 1629, Cardinal Richelieu wrote to Louis XIII: "One could think of Navarre and Franche-Comté as belonging to us, being contiguous to France and easy to conquer whenever and as long as we have nothing else to do."

Louis XIII, incensed by the expansion of the "House of Austria", allied himself with the Protestant Union, consisting of the princes of Germany and the Swedish King Gustavus Adolphus. Opposing them was the Catholic Liga, which included the Holy Roman Emperor Ferdinand II, the King of Hungary, the Spanish King Philip IV, and Duke Charles IV of Lorraine. However, Gaston, Duke of Orléans, brother of Louis XIII, who was rebelling against him, had connections with Charles IV of Lorraine and Philip IV.

Louis XIII then broke the Treaty of Neutrality, claiming that Besançon had welcomed Gaston d'Orléans, and on 27 May 1636, declared war, despite the opposition of the Parliament of Dole.

== Initial successes in Franche-Comté (1634-1637) ==
The conflict began successfully for the people of Franche-Comté: in 1634, a Swedish attack from Alsace by Otto Louis of Salm-Kyrburg-Mörchingen was countered at Lure, and in 1635, other attacks in the northeast were also repelled.

In 1636, the threat became more serious: Richelieu then concentrated an army of more than 25,000 men at Auxonne (border between Burgundy and Franche-Comté), whose command he entrusted to Henri de Bourbon-Condé. On the Comtois side, the parliament had two years earlier assigned the command of the county troops to the field marshal Gérard de Joux de Watteville, Marquis of Conflans, assisted and seconded by the parliamentarian Jean Girardot de Nozeroy[4]. The Comtois troops, lacking resources and munitions, amounted to a little more than 12,000 men[5]. Outnumbered, Watteville did not want to attack the French head-on and opted for a dispersion of the troops, which were quartered in the most important towns[4]. On 29 May 1636, the Prince of Condé appeared before Dole, which was at the time the capital of Franche-Comté. The latter thought that after the fall of Dole, which was the seat of government and parliament, the conquest of Franche-Comté would be much easier. But after a difficult siege lasting more than three months and faced with the arrival of 13,000 soldiers from Franche-Comté, the Imperialists, and Lorrainers — led by Charles IV of Lorraine, Franz von Mercy and Matthias Gallas, the Prince of Condé — had to lift the siege and go to defend Corbie in Picardy. In September 1636, the French also failed to penetrate the northwest of the county and had to abandon the siege of Champlitte. The armies of Charles IV, Duke of Lorraine, seized the opportunity to invade the Duchy of Burgundy. But although the invasion was initially successful, it was halted during the Siege of Saint-Jean-de-Losne in November 1636. The Lorrainers and the Imperialists retreated into Franche-Comté, which was not without problems.

In 1637, Watteville organized a double offensive to regain the initiative against the French. He charged his son, the Count of Bussolin, with launching a major offensive against French Bugey. He himself led another offensive in Bresse, where he achieved great success at the Siege of Savigny. However, even after winning the battles of Martignat and conquering a dozen places, including Oyonnax, the Comtois in Bugey were unable to hold these territories due to a lack of troops. In late February and early March, the Comtois returned home, abandoning most of their conquests. These conquests were not possible because the parliament was in rivalry with the military command. The aborted Bresse campaign would lead to the French return to the County of Burgundy.

Without the support of Parliament, which refused him the artillery of the imperials returned from the Duchy of Burgundy as well as elements of cavalry, Watteville wanted to attack the French enclave of Cornod. Serious dissension between his officers, as well as a botched reconnaissance of the terrain, caused the defeat of Watteville's army, surprised by the French during the siege of the castle. The defeat of Cornod, on 13 March 1637, marked the end of this period of success for the Comtois and the beginning of difficult times for the county. Watteville would be dismissed from his duties and the Comtois army, which had lost two-thirds of its troops. The army was placed under the command of Charles de Lorraine. The Comtois authorities no longer had any say in the further conduct of the war.

== France gains the advantage (1637-1638) ==
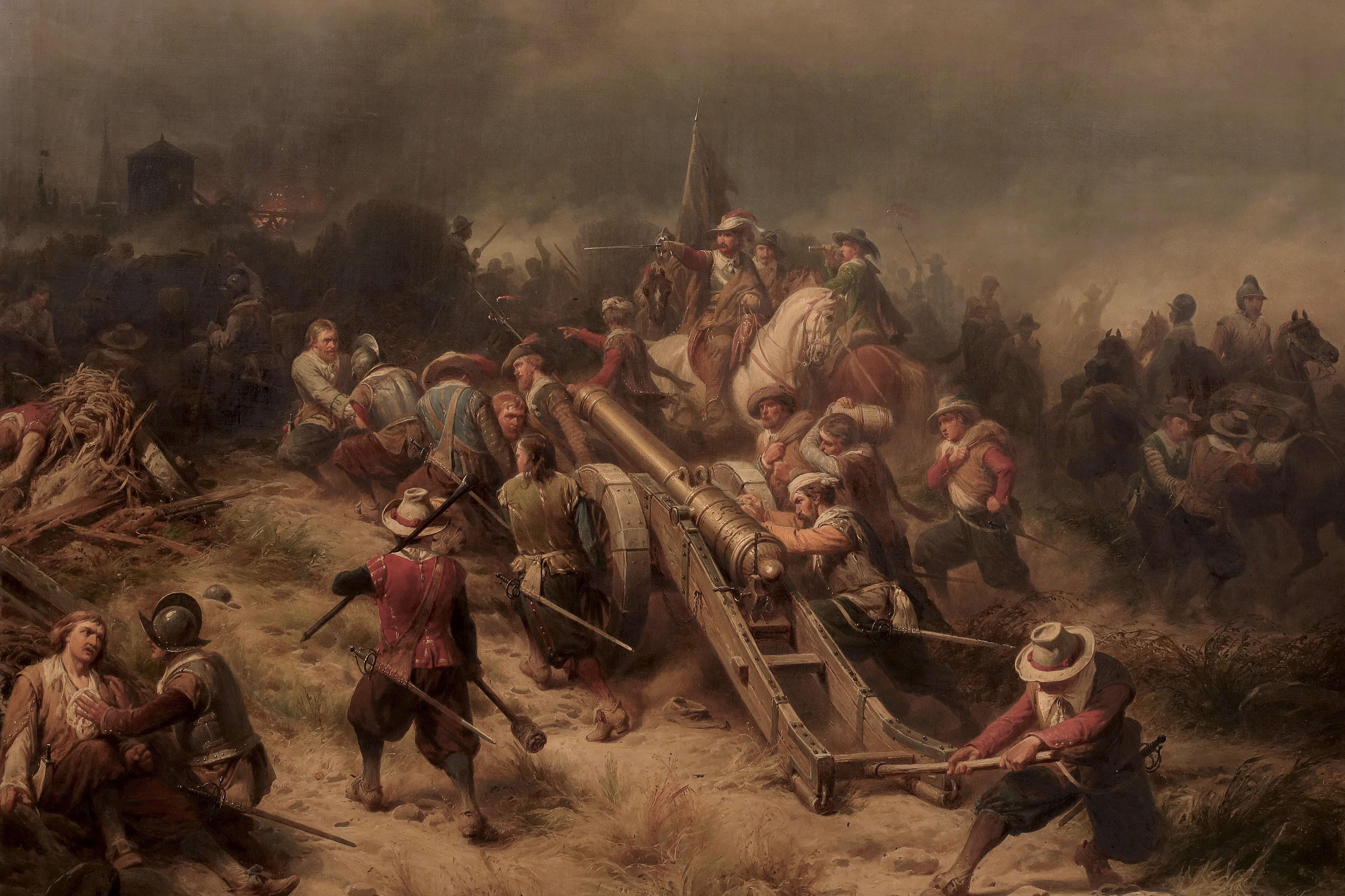
Bernard's Siege of Breisach

That year, three armies invaded the region simultaneously: Duke Bernard of Saxe-Weimar via the Saône, Jacques Rouxel de Grancey Montbéliard via Montbélliard, and Henri d'Orléans-Longueville via Bresse. On 29 March 1637, the wealthy town of Saint-Amour, Jura, in the Bailiwick of Aval, was besieged by the Duke of Longueville. After the town's inhabitants held out for a week, the town fell into French hands, along with several other villages in the surrounding area.

The French tactic was simple and terribly effective: besiege small towns to avoid having to attack the major centers of resistance, often located in the region's major cities. Thus, Saint-Claude and Moirans were taken, then Lons-le-Saunier, after a two-week siege. The Duke of Saxe-Weimar, who was in the service of the French, did the same, pillaging and devastating everything in his path. Many towns were stormed and besieged, including Jonvelle, Jussey, and Bletterans; other villages suffered an even crueler fate, such as Pierrecourt, which was completely destroyed by fire, and whose inhabitants were all executed. The Duke of Saxe-Weimar also besieged numerous castles and fortresses near the Saône.

In April, command of the armies of Franche-Comté was entrusted to Jean-Baptiste de la Baume, Marquis of Saint-Martin. Although the Comtois no longer had an army as such, they still had garrisons in large towns such as Gray, Dole, and Besançon. But there were also Lorraine contingents of several thousand men and a few smaller imperial and Spanish troops. Together, these forces were a challenge to France. Charles IV, the Duke of Lorraine, was entrusted with the government of Franche-Comté by Phillip IV. He decided to stay in Besançon, while his soldiers were tasked with defending the bailiwick of Amont. But his undisciplined soldiers pillaged the region. The bailiwick of Amont was sacked and weakened by both its enemies (the French), and its allies (the Lorrainers).

In 1638, the region was thus partly devastated by war, in addition to being a victim of the plague, which continued its ravages, begun in 1636 during the siege of Dole (1638). At the beginning of the year, the ultimate command of all the allied armies was entrusted to Charles IV of Lorraine. However, a huge victory won at Poligny over the French was not enough to reverse the course of the conflict, which became increasingly destructive for the region. Worse still, the strategic choices of Charles of Lorraine following the battle displeased the allies, creating deep divisions. The second battle of Poligny, added to other defeats in Germany, finally undermined the cohesion of the allies, and divided them for good. Lorrainers and Imperials returned home, leaving the province virtually defenseless.

== A ravaged Franche-Comté ==
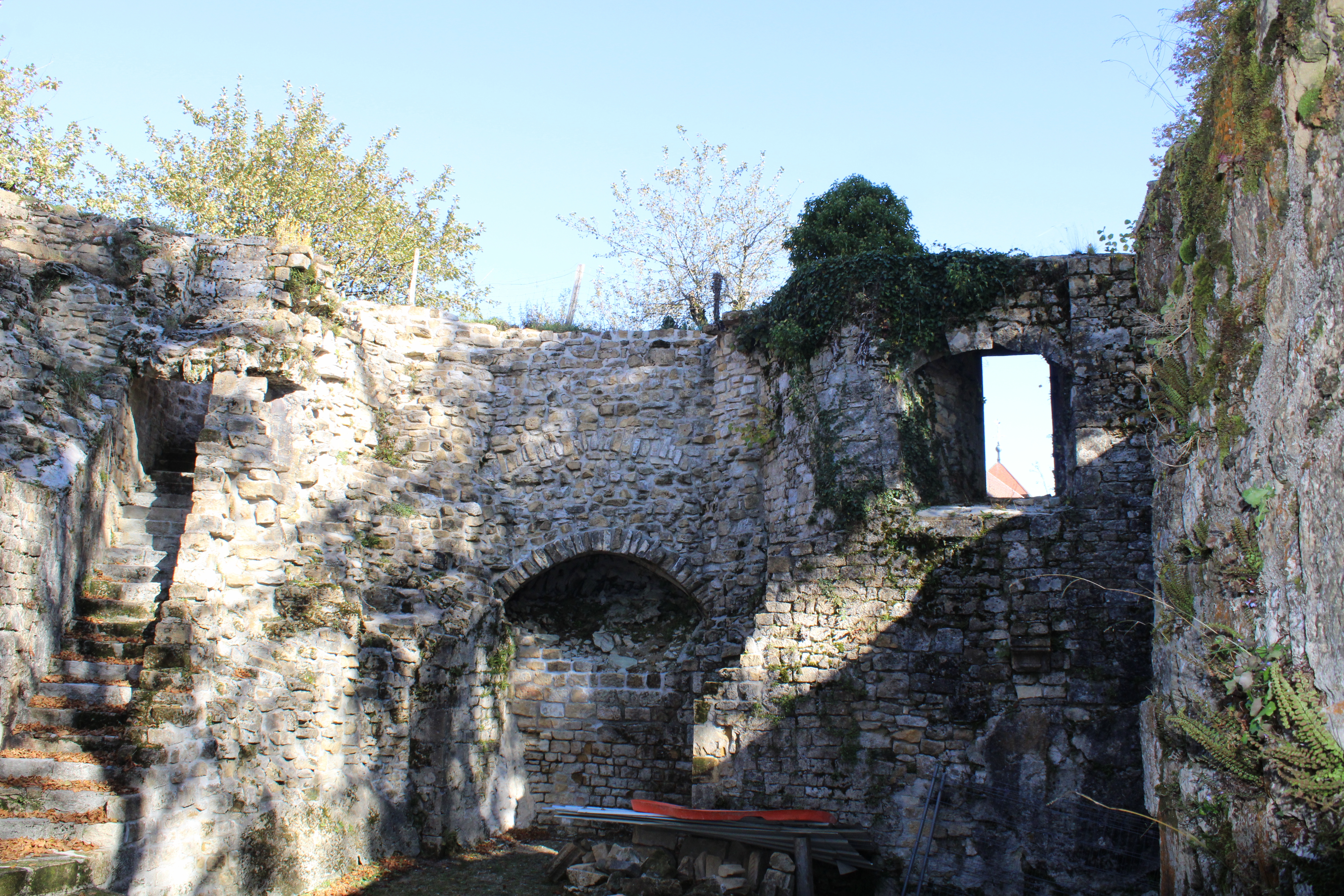
Chateau de Nozeroy

Franche-Comté was then faced with another, even more devastating scourge: famine. Many Franche-Comté residents fled hunger and emigrated to Savoy, Switzerland, and some even to Italy, Milan, and Rome. Here is what Girardot de Nozeroy says about it in his writings, entitled Ten-Year History of Franche-Comté of Burgundy:

"The sacred books recount with tears the sad afflictions of the Jewish people: Joseph narrates the famine that was in Jerusalem during its siege where mothers ate their own children: the siege of Paris (1590) under Henry IV has something approaching, but (without bidding anything) the famine of our Burgundy in this year 1638 surpassed all that incomparably. Posterity will not believe it, the rich who possessed many savings and had had savings at the beginning, were exhausted, the poor peasants were withdrawn to the cities without labor or employment, the corn (wheat) scarce everywhere was sold at excessive prices: one lived on the herbs of the gardens and those of the fields: the carrion of dead animals was sought in the roads, but this table did not remain long set: the gates of the cities were kept closed to avoid being overwhelmed by the number of starving people who came there, and outside the gates the roads half a league away were paved with people who were wasted and destroyed, most of them stretched out from weakness and dying: in the cities the dogs and cats were delicate morsels, then the rats being in reign were requisitioned, I myself saw people well covered collect dead rats from the streets, throw them out of the windows of houses, and hide them to eat. Finally, we came to human flesh, first in the army where the soldiers who were killed served as pasture for the others who cut off the more fleshy parts of the dead bodies to boil or roast, and outside the camp they pecked at human flesh to eat: in the villages, we discovered murders of children committed by their mothers to keep themselves from dying and of brothers by their brothers, and the face of the cities was everywhere the face of death."

After attacking the plains of the County of Burgundy, Alsace, and the County of Montbéliard, France also wanted the Jura Mountains as its border. Bernard of Saxe-Weimar, who had already invaded Alsace and was no longer able to support his troops in this region, planned to move closer to Franche-Comté. At that time, Richelieu ordered Bernard "to invade and conquer, in the name of France, all of Franche-Comté bordering Switzerland," that is, the mountainous region, which was much less affected by famine than the flat country, thus furthering his plans. He then entered Franche-Comté without hesitation, through the village of Saint-Hippolyte, which he set on fire. Shortly after, Bernard of Saxe-Weimar pillaged Morteau and sacked Montbenoît.

On 4 February 1639, Jean-Baptiste Comte de Guébriant besieged Nozeroy, then held by Roland de Montrichard, and established his headquarters there. On February 14, the Château de Joux was captured by the Swedes, thanks to the fear or corruption of the lieutenant who commanded it. On April 20, de Guébriant captured Château-Vilain and, the following day, the Château de La Chaux.

On 16 May 1639, the Duke of Saxe-Weimar captured the town of Saint-Claude, Jura. Bernard, desperate to capture Besançon and Salins-les-Bains, burned all the villages and buildings along the road from Pontarlier to Salins-les-Bains. On July 6, the town of Pontarlier was ravaged by flames, killing more than 400 people in a fire that swept through the city in less than two hours. At the same time, several villages were destroyed: Les Alliés, the old village of Cessay, "la Goutte-d'Or", and Bougnon. Other villages were spared, sometimes in an anecdotal way: the village of Bouverans was said to have been spared because a resident had agreed to shoe the horses, and Bulle escaped the fire because of a thick fog, hiding the village from the enemy. On July 8, after six months of pillaging and cruelty during which the Swedes had enriched themselves, Bernard returned to Alsace. He died of the plague on 18 July 1639, in Neuburg, at the age of 35. During the occupation of the region, the Franche-Comté did not remain inactive.

== Guerrilla warfare in Franche-Comté ==
César de Saix d'Arnans, leader of the Franche-Comté partisans, led a skirmish war against the invaders from 1639 onwards and pillaged Bresse several times. He also recaptured the towns of Chaux-les-Crotenay and Nozeroy from the French, with the help of Colonels Louis de la Verne and François de Saint-Mauris, he commanded the famous Lacuzon.

Cart-Broumet also made life difficult for the Swedish troops. Leading a troop of volunteers from Mouthe and its surrounding areas, Cart-Broumet harassed the Weimar troops scattered throughout the region and acquired a solid reputation. He fought notably between Sainte-Colombe and La Rivière, near Chaffois, and near Bief-du-Fourg. He also participated in the defense of Nozeroy. After the death of Bernard, the Marquis of Saint-Martin took over Nozeroy, Château-Vilain, and the Château de La Chaux.

At the same time, Don Antonio Sarmiento de Toledo attempted to retake the Château de Joux, with the help of the Duke of Burgundy's troops. In reality, this attempt was intended to draw the enemy into a corner of the Franche-Comté province and thus allow the inhabitants to harvest their crops and grapes. Some time later, Sarmiento lifted the siege of the Château de Joux. After learning that this siege had been lifted, the Marquis de Villeroy decided to return to France to continue the war on the banks of the Ain, against the Franche-Comté partisan troops. King Philip IV of Spain appointed Councillor Boyvin president of the Parliament of Dole in April 1639, after Boyvin had complained that he had no one to lead it. The other vacant positions were also filled, and on 12 November 1639, the Parliament of Dole resumed its regular sessions.

Also in 1639, the Parliament of Dole placed a garrison in Nozeroy under the command of Arnans. For three years following this decision, the men of this garrison pillaged and mistreated the population. In Grimont (an old village), the French heavily ransomed those they took prisoner. In Franche-Comté, famine continued to ravage the towns of Besançon, Salins-les-Bains, Dole, and Gray. Except for a few wheat convoys from Switzerland or Savoy, food was becoming increasingly scarce.

In the spring of 1640, Baron d'Arnans led a victorious second offensive in Bresse with his 260 remaining men. But this victory was marred by poor strategic choices and continued looting in the Jura.

== Last years (1642–1644) ==
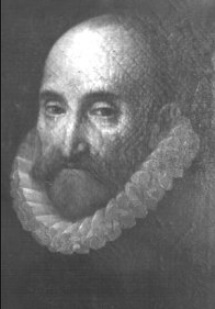
Lacuzon, an important leader of the late stages of the war

In November 1641, the course of the war improved slightly for the Comtois, who enjoyed some successes thanks to Lacuzon's spectacular capture of the fortress of Saint Laurent-la-Roche. With this action, he put an end to the French pillaging raids that had been raging from the fortress. He then launched a series of victorious raids in Bresse, where he brought back a large haul of booty and supplies. He also defeated French troops several times at Battle of Montmorot and Battle of Maynal, where they had ambushed him.

Fortunately, the kingdom of France was undergoing some changes at this time after the death of Richelieu in December 1642, followed by that of Louis XIII in May 1643. Through M. de la Pie, farmer of the salt works of Dole, and with the consent of the King of Spain, the parliament of Dole negotiated with France, which was then placed under the regency of Anne of Austria since the new King of France, Louis XIV, was only five years old.

== Aftermath ==
Following a special treaty concluded with Cardinal Mazarin in 1644, France agreed to end hostilities in Franche-Comté, for the tidy sum of 40,000 écus, but thus once again guaranteeing the region's neutrality. The year 1644 thus saw the end of the Ten Years' War in Franche-Comté. The war did not stop in Europe, and particularly in Germany. The Treaties of Westphalia, in 1648, between the German Emperor Ferdinand III, France, and Sweden, put an end to the Thirty Years' War.

After the Ten Years' War, the situation in Franche-Comté was disastrous: war, plague, and famine devastated the region. The toll was extremely high: several towns and 70 castles were burned down, 150 villages disappeared, and tens of thousands died.

The entire economy and demographics of the region were disrupted, particularly agriculture, which was completely wiped out. The number of dead and exiled was also very high: the 1614 census showed that between 405,000 and 410,000 people lived in Franche-Comté, compared to the 1657 census (13 years after the end of the fighting), which indicated that there were only approximately 160,000 inhabitants in the region, a decrease of more than 60%. It is estimated that around two thirds of the people of Franche-Comté died during the Ten Years' War, or more than 270,000 people.

== See also ==
- Thirty Years' War – Major war in Central Europe (1618–1648)
- French–Habsburg rivalry – Territorial and military conflicts between the House of Habsburg and France
