= Battle of Bordeaux (1653) =

1653 naval battle

- Part of the Franco-Spanish War (1635)
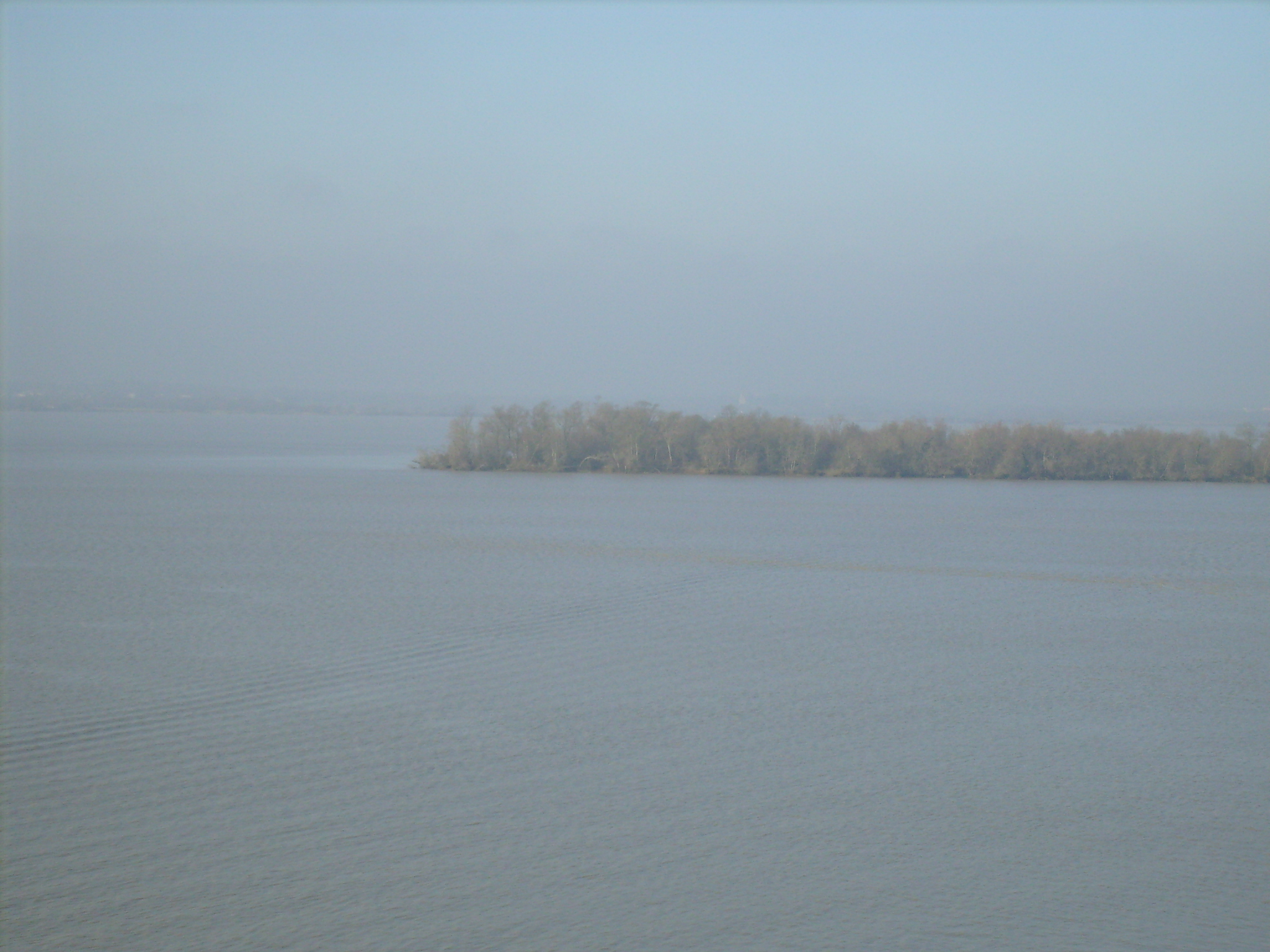
- The Gironde estuary seen from the citadel of Blaye.
Date	20 October 1653
Location	Gironde estuary near Montagne, France
Result	Spanish victory

Belligerents
France	Spain

Commanders and leaders
(Kingdom of France) Duke of Vendôme	(Spain) Marquis of Santa Cruz

Strength
Unknown naval forces ~3,000 soldiers and militia	30 warships Three tercios

Casualties and losses
3 galleys captured, 7 brigantines captured, 2 frigates burnt, 2 brigantines burnt, 15 barges burnt	None

The Battle of Bordeaux was a naval engagement of the Franco-Spanish War of 1635–1659 fought on 20 October 1653 in the Gironde estuary. A Spanish fleet under Álvaro de Bazán, 3rd Marquis of Santa Cruz, sent to relieve Bordeaux, at that time held by the nobles rose up against Louis XIV during the Fronde, encountered a great concentration of French warships belonging to the Duke of Vendome's army in the channel of Blaye and captured or destroyed most of it. Shortly after a landing was made by some 1,600 soldiers of the Spanish Tercios which sacked the village of Montagne-sur-Gironde. A similar attempt in the Island of Ré was repulsed, so Santa Cruz, having accomplished his orders, returned to Spain.

== Background ==
In 1650, during the Fronde, King Philip IV of Spain allied with the Duchess of Longueville and Vicomte de Turenne, offering them warships, soldiers and money to fight his enemy Louis XIV of France. Most of the Spanish fleet, however, was occupied in the blockade of Barcelona, and only three frigates commanded by José de Osorio could be sent to Girdonde estuary (although they were later reinforced by at least eight galleons under Baron of Vatteville). Archduke Leopold Wilhem succeeded in attacking the French fleet at Dunkirk and defeated it with great loss, while the Grand Admiral Duke of Vendôme captured the fortress of Bourg-sur-Gironde from the Spanish on 4 July 1653, investing Bordeaux shortly after.

King Philip IV then ordered a fleet composed of eight galleons, eight fireships and all the frigates and pinnaces available to sail with urgency to relieve Bordeaux from the port of Pasaia. In addition, Marquis of Santa Cruz and Admiral Manuel de Buñuelos were urged to sail from Cádiz in command of the Armada del Mar Océano with the same purpose. Despite all the efforts, when the Spanish fleet arrived, Bordeaux, due to lack of supplies, had capitulated to the French Royal Army. Santa Cruz was, however, ordered then attack the French fleet of the Grand Admiral Duke of Vendôme.

== Battle ==
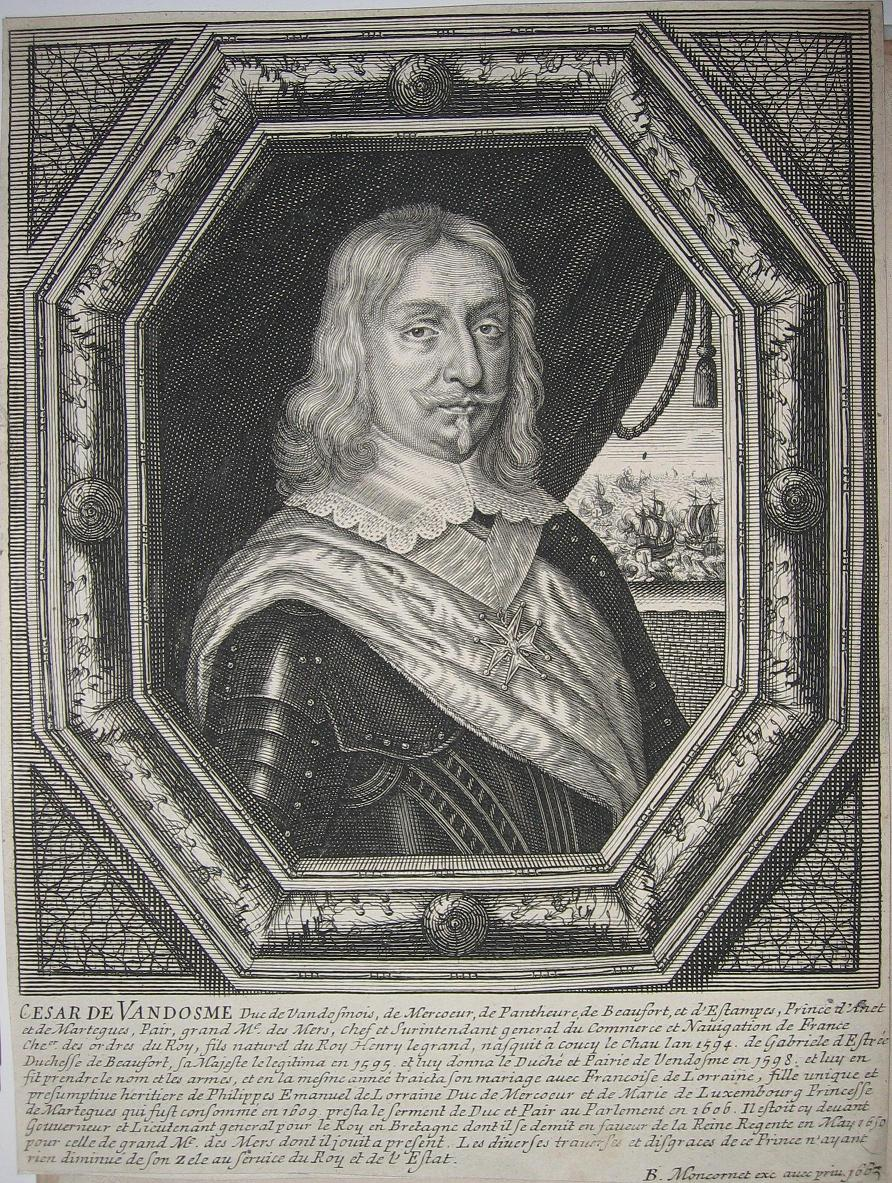
Engraved portrait of Duke of Vendôme by Balthasar Moncornet.

As the position of the French warships remained unknown to the Spanish, Santa Cruz spent some time searching them along the estuary. I was not until 14 October when a French squadron of 3 galleys and 8 brigantines was sighted entering the Blaye's channel. Santa Cruz immediately dispatched 4 frigates and 2 fireships to block the mouth of the channel and sent Lieutenant General Luis de Guzmán to explore the area. It proved to be a gut inaccessible for the biggest ships, as during the low tide the water level was extremely low, so it was planned attack the French squadron by land.

By 20 October the preparations were ready. At 3:00 AM. of that day Melchor de la Cueva's, Duke of Veragua's and Francisco de Meneses' tercios landed on both shores of the channel and moved towards the French vessel's concentration, located in front of a castle garrisoned by a French and a Scottish regiments. These troops, along with a cavalry corps coming from a nearby village, skirmished with the Spanish tercios until 5:00 PM., when the high tide allowed the Spanish seamen to sail 3 galleys and 7 brigantines out of the channel. 2 frigates, 2 brigantines and 15 barges were set on fire due to the impossibility of refloating them, as well as the houses of the bourg after being sacked. The whole operation was carried out with no casualty.

== Aftermath ==
The day following the battle, the Spanish ships shelled the village of Montagne, after which 1,600 soldiers were landed and looted it, capturing large amounts of cattle, wine, wheat and other provisions. Royan and several other nearby places were also plundered. Few days later, a surprise attack on the Island of Ré failed due to the errors of Santa Cruz and Buñuelos. After that Santa Cruz returned to Spain. His fleet anchored in the port Pasaia, near San Sebastián, despite he had no orders to do it. For this reason or for his failure against Ré, he was imprisoned in the Castle of San Torcaz. Admiral Manuel de Buñuelos was also punished, being recluded in the Castle of Vélez.
