= Treaty of Lyon (1601) =

1601 peace treaty between France and Savoy

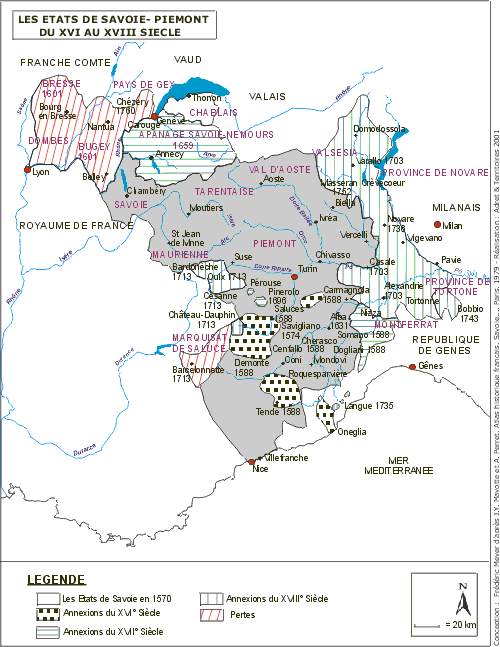
Territorial changes of 1601

The Treaty of Lyon was signed on 17 January 1601 between France and Savoy, to bring an end to the Franco-Savoyard War of 1600–1601. Based on the terms of the treaty, Henry IV of France relinquished Saluzzo to Savoy, while Savoy kept Pont de Gresin, Valserine, and was required to pay France 150,000 livres. In return, Henry acquired Bugey, Valromey, Gex, and Bresse.

Eventually, the territory of Bresse was attached to the French military government of Burgundy.

== See also ==
- List of treaties

== Sources ==
- Pitts, Vincent J. (2009). Henri IV of France: His Reign and Age. Johns Hopkins University Press.
