= Gyula =

Gyula may refer to:

- Gyula (title), Hungarian leader title in the 9th–10th centuries
- Gyula (name), Hungarian male given name, derived from the title

People

- Gyula II, the Hungarian gyula who ruled Transylvania in the 10th-century and was baptized in Constantinople around 950
- Gyula III, the gyula who ruled Transylvania and was defeated by his maternal uncle, King Stephen I of Hungary around 1003

Places

- Gyula, Hungary, town in Hungary
- Gyulaháza, village in Hungary
- Gyulakeszi, village in Hungary
- Gyulafehérvár, Hungarian name of Alba Iulia, city in Romania, the former seat of the Transylvanian gyulas
