= Cornod =

Commune in Bourgogne-Franche-Comté, France

- Commune
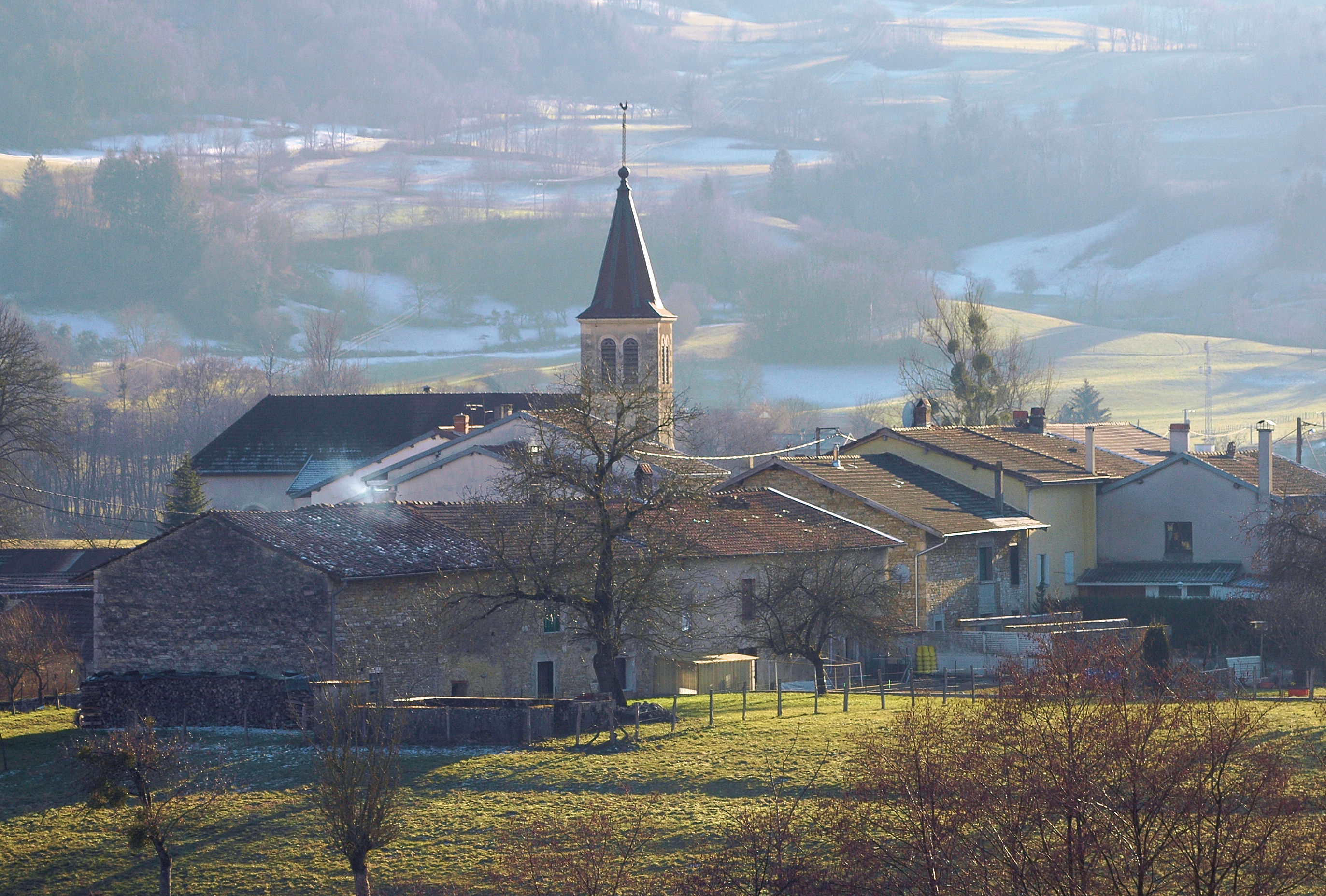
- The church and surroundings in Cornod
- Location of Cornod
- Location within France Location within Bourgogne-Franche-Comté
- Coordinates: 46°18′51″N 5°32′58″E
- Country: France
- Region: Bourgogne-Franche-Comté
- Department: Jura
- Arrondissement: Lons-le-Saunier
- Canton: Moirans-en-Montagne

Government
  - Mayor (2020–2026): Patrick Andrey
- Area^{1}: 13.99 km^{2} (5.40 sq mi)
- Highest elevation: 680 m (2,230 ft)
- Lowest elevation: 305 m (1,001 ft)
- Population (2023): 213
  - Density: 15.2/km^{2} (39.4/sq mi)
- Time zone: UTC+01:00 (CET)
  - Summer (DST): UTC+02:00 (CEST)
- INSEE/Postal code: 39166 /39240
- ^{1} French Land Register data, which excludes lakes, ponds, glaciers > 1 km^{2} (0.386 sq mi or 247 acres) and river estuaries.

Cornod (French pronunciation: [kɔʁno]) is a commune in the Jura department in Bourgogne-Franche-Comté in eastern France.

== Population ==
Historical population
| Year | Pop. | ±% p.a. |
|---|---|---|
| 1968 | 223 | — |
| 1975 | 192 | −2.12% |
| 1982 | 189 | −0.22% |
| 1990 | 177 | −0.82% |
| 1999 | 219 | +2.39% |
| 2007 | 223 | +0.23% |
| 2012 | 236 | +1.14% |
| 2017 | 218 | −1.57% |
| 2023 | 213 | −0.39% |
Source: INSEE

== See also ==
- Château de Cornod, a listed castle.
- Communes of the Jura department
