= Jura =

Jura may refer to:

== Places ==
- Jura, Scotland, island of the Inner Hebrides off Great Britain
- Jūra, river in Lithuania

=== Mountain ranges ===
- Jura Mountains, 400 km long, straddling France and Switzerland
- Franconian Jura, south-central Germany
- Swabian Jura, south-western Germany
- Table Jura, north-eastern part of Jura Mountains
- Montes Jura, on the Moon near Mare Imbrium

=== Regions ===
- Jura (department), France
- Canton of Jura, Switzerland
- Bernese Jura, part of the Swiss canton of Bern
- Polish Jura, an upland of southern Poland

=== Villages ===
- Jura, Ontario, Canada
- Jura, Transnistria, Moldova
- Al-Jura, Mandatory Palestine
- Al-Jura, Jerusalem, Mandatory Palestine

== Companies and organisations ==
- Jura Books, anarchist bookshop in Sydney, Australia
- Jura distillery, Scotch whisky distillery on the island of Jura
- Jura Elektroapparate, Swiss developer and distributor of home appliances
- Jura Federation, the anarchist, Bakuninist faction of the 19th century First International

== People ==
- Jura (given name), Slavic masculine name
- Jura (Brazilian footballer) (born 1971 as Jurandir Fatori), Brazilian football player
- Chuck Jura (born 1950), American basketball player
- Hubert Jura (1916–?), Polish soldier

== Ships ==
- Jura (ship, 1854), steamship on Lake Neuchâtel, Switzerland, and Lake Constance
- Jura (ship, 2006), vessel of the Scottish Fisheries Protection Agency

== Other uses ==
- Jurassic, a geological period
- Jura, or iura, plural of jus (or ius), in Roman law
- Jura wine, a French wine region
- Jura, a 2015 album by the Mekons and Robbie Fulks
- Jura (house), a heritage-listed house in Lorne, Victoria, Australia
- Jūra (The Sea), name of a symphonic poem for orchestra by Mikalojus Konstantinas Čiurlionis
- Jura, or the Great Forest of Jura, the fictional setting for the light novel, That Time I Got Reincarnated as a Slime
- Jura or joora, term for a hair bun in India

== See also ==
- Jurassien dialect, a dialect of Franco-Provençal
- Chemins de fer du Jura, a railway company in the Swiss canton of Jura
- Gyula (disambiguation)
