= Château de Cornod =

Château in Jura, Franche-Comté, France

Coordinates: 46.3121°N 5.5525°E

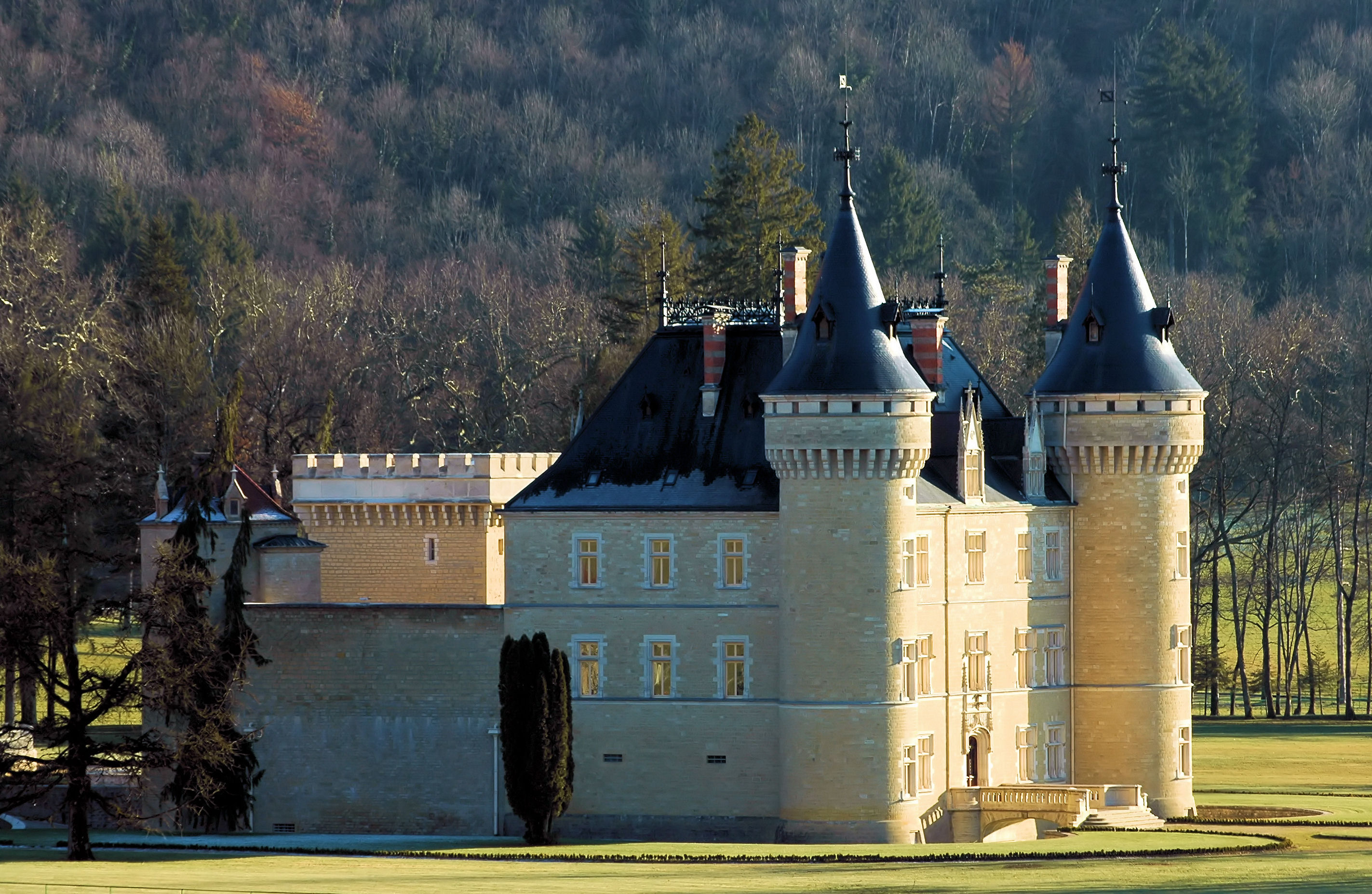
- Interactive map of the Château de Cornod area

The Château de Cornod is a Gothic Revival château in Cornod, Jura, Franche-Comté, France.

== History ==
It was built in 1876 to the design of architects Henri Despierre and Henri Feuga.

== Architectural significance ==
It has been listed as an official historical monument by the French Ministry of Culture since 1971.
