= Bletterans =

Commune in Bourgogne-Franche-Comté, France

- Commune
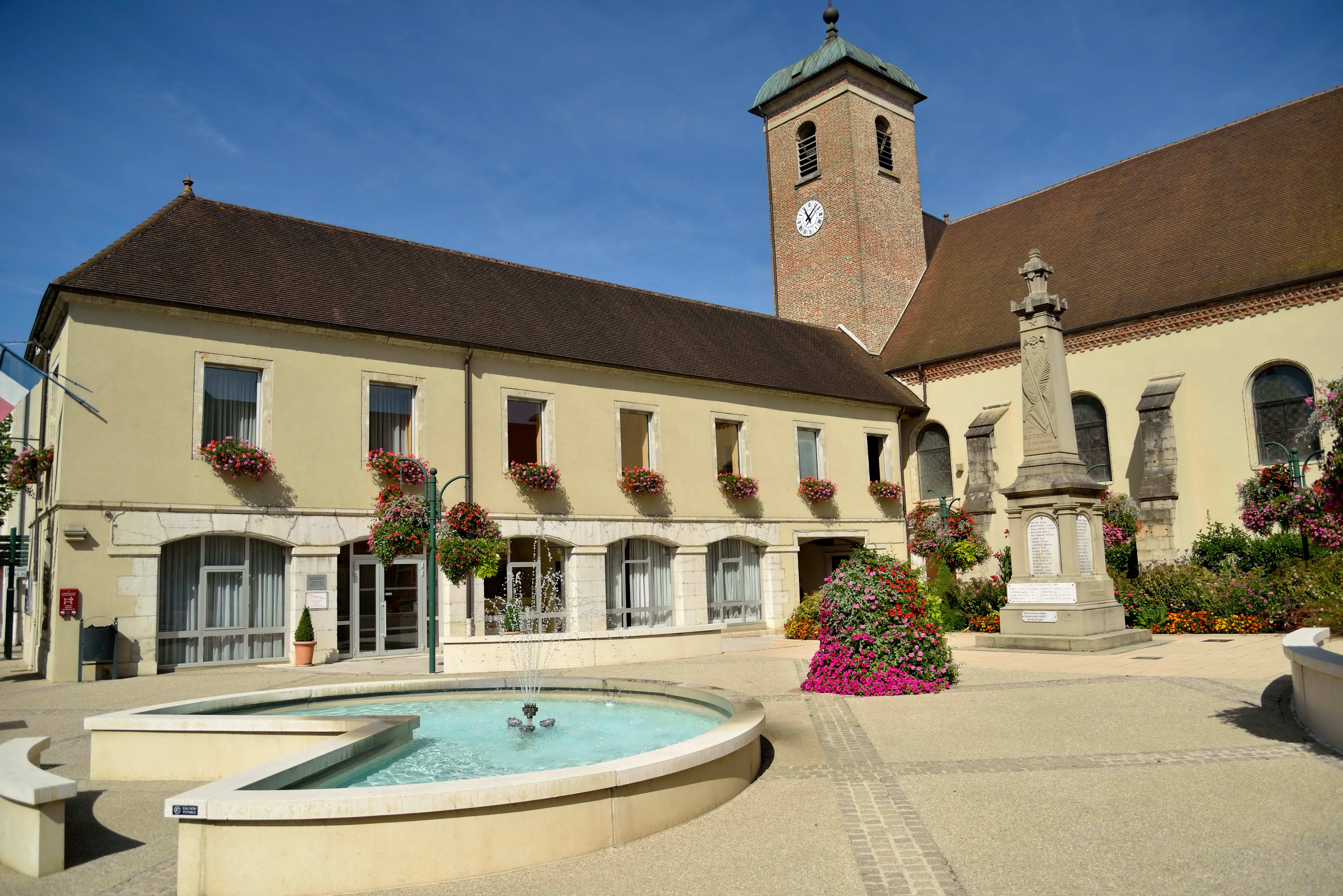
- The town hall square in Bletterans

- Coat of arms
- Location of Bletterans
- Location within France Location within Bourgogne-Franche-Comté
- Coordinates: 46°44′50″N 5°27′18″E
- Country: France
- Region: Bourgogne-Franche-Comté
- Department: Jura
- Arrondissement: Lons-le-Saunier
- Canton: Bletterans

Government
  - Mayor (2020–2026): Stéphane Lamberger
- Area^{1}: 7.97 km^{2} (3.08 sq mi)
- Highest elevation: 224 m (735 ft)
- Lowest elevation: 190 m (620 ft)
- Population (2023): 1,528
  - Density: 192/km^{2} (497/sq mi)
- Time zone: UTC+01:00 (CET)
  - Summer (DST): UTC+02:00 (CEST)
- INSEE/Postal code: 39056 /39140
- ^{1} French Land Register data, which excludes lakes, ponds, glaciers > 1 km^{2} (0.386 sq mi or 247 acres) and river estuaries.

Bletterans (French pronunciation: [blɛtʁɑ̃]) is a commune in the Jura department in Bourgogne-Franche-Comté in eastern France.

== Population ==
Historical population
Year	Pop.	±% p.a.
1968	1,085	—
1975	1,165	+1.02%
1982	1,350	+2.13%
1990	1,423	+0.66%
1999	1,359	−0.51%
2007	1,392	+0.30%
2012	1,418	+0.37%
2017	1,446	+0.39%
2023	1,528	+0.92%
Source: INSEE

== See also ==
- Communes of the Jura department
