= Jean de Watteville =

French noble (1618–1702)

Jean De Watteville (1618–1702) was a Burgundian noble of Flemish extraction who became a Carthusian monk.

His father was Pierre de Watteville, who settled in Spain and pursued a military career. His mother was Giuditta de Brebbia, daughter of a senator from Milan. His elder brother was Charles de Watteville, a diplomat in the service of Spain. Jean De Watteville was born in Besançon in 1618, and joined the army at a young age. He fought in Italy for the Habsburgs against the French. Having killed a Spanish officer in a quarrel, De Watteville fled to Paris, where he sought refuge in a Carthusian monastery.

De Watteville apparently found the practice of chastity burdensome, and one night was discovered climbing over the monastery wall. He killed the Prior with a shot from his pistol and made his escape. The following day he killed another man in a pub brawl, and so fled onwards again to Spain. In Perpignan he seduced the daughter of his host before killing again, this time during a duel with a gentleman, son of a Spanish grandee, and so was forced to go on the run once more. eventually he arrived in Turkey, where he converted to Islam and became a Pasha.

De Watteville then defected to the Venetians and handed over to them several Ottoman fortresses in return for a Papal guarantee that he would be pardoned and could return to the priesthood. This done he returned to Burgundy and collected various rich benefices, plotting to overthrow Spanish rule and replace it with that of Louis XIV. His ambition was to become Archbishop of Besançon, but the Pope reminded him about the double murder, breaking of vows, apostasy etc. and he withdrew to another rich abbey.
