= Charles de Watteville =

Burgundian noble, military man and diplomat

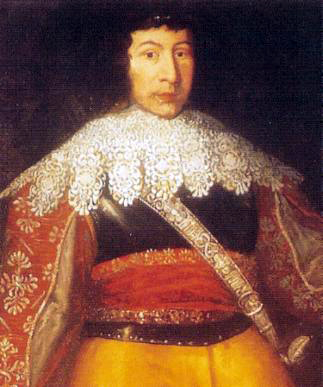
Portrait of Charles de Watteville, painted in Italy ca. 1637–40.

Charles Watteville de Joux (Franche-Comté, Spanish Empire, 1605 – Lisbon, Portugal, 1670), 1st Baron of Watteville, was a Burgundian noble, soldier and diplomat in the service of King Philip IV of Spain. His surname is supposed to be an adaptation into French of the origin of his grandfather, a native of Wattenwil (Switzerland), and has also been translated as Batteville, Vatteville and Vatevile.
He also had the titles of Count of La Corbière and Knight of the Golden Fleece.

== Biography ==
He was the son of Pierre de Watteville de Joux (1575–1631) and his wife Catalina Bobbio, Countess of Bussolino. His younger brother was Jean de Watteville, Abbot of Baume-les-Messieurs, famous for his eventful life.

He participated in the Thirty Years' War, fighting against the French in Valtellina, enrolled in the Burgundian Tercio. In 1638 he took command of that Tercio, when it fought in Milan and participated in the defense of Trino, besieged by Marshal Turenne in 1643. He also participated in the defense of fortresses in Tuscany in 1646, and as Mariscal de campo in the recovery of Naples in 1648. He negotiated on behalf of the King of Spain the assistance of the rebel fleet that supported the Fronde uprising against King Louis XIV of France in the Battle of Bordeaux (1653) in the Bordeaux estuary.

=== Diplomatic activity ===
In 1651, on the recommendation of Luis Méndez de Haro, he was named Captain General of Guipúzcoa, a position he held until 1660, when Philip IV named him Spanish Ambassador in London to the court of Charles II of England. His nephew, Jean Charles de Watteville, had been in charge of the extraordinary embassy in London that preceded his arrival. During his embassy in London, relations between the two kingdoms deteriorated, attributed to Charles II's friendship with Portugal and the bellicose policy of his Prime Minister, Edward Hyde, 1st Earl of Clarendon. According to Clarendon, Watteville was

a rough man, who seemed to be from the country, but who really knew the intrigues of the court better than most Spaniards, and, except when his passion surprised him, he was cautious and shrewd in his negotiations.

Despite his intention to avoid conflict, on 30 September 1661 he would be the protagonist of a famous incident that cost him his privileged position. The event occurred when, after the arrival of a new Swedish ambassador to England had been announced, the delegations of Spain and France, headed by their respective ambassadors, announced their attendance to receive the diplomat. After the landing of the new representative, a dispute over the precedence of the Ambassadors' carriages erupted between the Spanish and French delegations (led by Count Godefroi, Comte d'Estrades) which degenerated into a pitched battle that left several dead and wounded. The event was widely commented on by the chroniclers of the time, such as Samuel Pepys, who due to his animosity towards the French celebrated the 'victory' of the Spanish in his famous diary. The event angered King Louis XIV, who expelled the Spanish ambassador in Paris and threatened to declare war on Spain if the guilty were not punished, which led to the return of Watteville to Madrid.

After his return from London, he was held prisoner in the castle of Santorcaz, not recovering his role at Court until the death of Philip IV, in 1665. Already under the regency of Mariana of Austria, in 1666 he was assigned as extraordinary ambassador to Rome. He participated in the negotiations for the defense of Franche-Comté, claimed by the French and in 1668, after the Portuguese Restoration War, he was entrusted with the new embassy in Portugal, where he died in 1670.

Shortly before dying, Queen Mariana had named him a knight of the Order of the Golden Fleece.

He never married and had no children.
