= Bourg-de-Sirod =

Commune in Bourgogne-Franche-Comté, France

- Commune
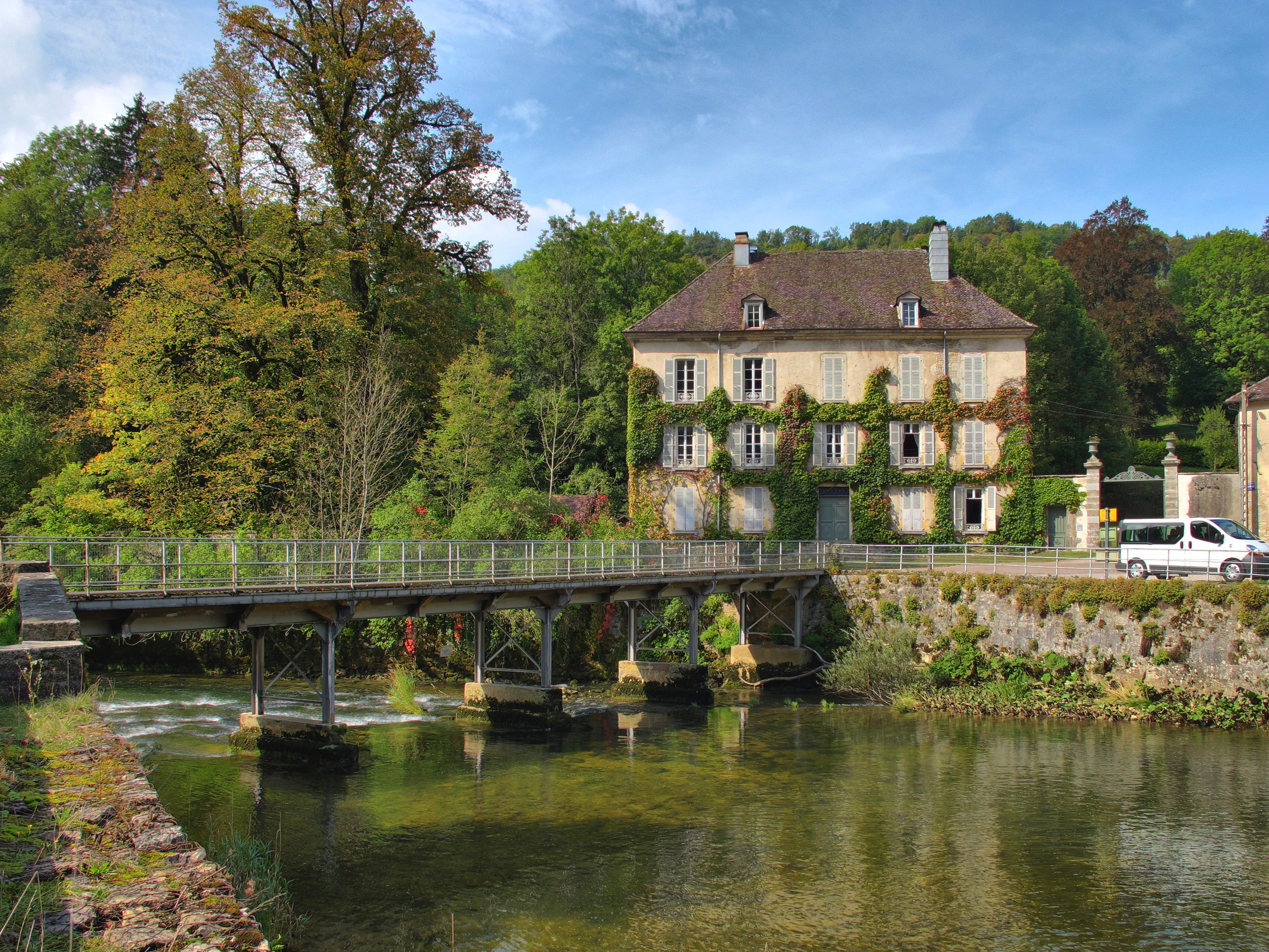
- The river Ain in Bourg de Sirod

- Coat of arms
- Location of Bourg-de-Sirod
- Location within France Location within Bourgogne-Franche-Comté
- Coordinates: 46°43′47″N 5°57′28″E
- Country: France
- Region: Bourgogne-Franche-Comté
- Department: Jura
- Arrondissement: Lons-le-Saunier
- Canton: Champagnole

Government
  - Mayor (2020–2026): Christophe Toniutti
- Area^{1}: 4.42 km^{2} (1.71 sq mi)
- Highest elevation: 804 m (2,638 ft)
- Lowest elevation: 529 m (1,736 ft)
- Population (2023): 88
  - Density: 20/km^{2} (52/sq mi)
- Time zone: UTC+01:00 (CET)
  - Summer (DST): UTC+02:00 (CEST)
- INSEE/Postal code: 39070 /39300
- ^{1} French Land Register data, which excludes lakes, ponds, glaciers > 1 km^{2} (0.386 sq mi or 247 acres) and river estuaries.

Bourg-de-Sirod (French pronunciation: [buʁ də siʁo]; Arpitan: Lou Bœû) is a commune in the Jura department in Bourgogne-Franche-Comté in eastern France.

== Population ==
Historical population
Year	Pop.	±% p.a.
1968	83	—
1975	81	−0.35%
1982	68	−2.47%
1990	63	−0.95%
1999	86	+3.52%
2007	98	+1.65%
2012	92	−1.26%
2017	94	+0.43%
2023	88	−1.09%
Source: INSEE

== See also ==
- Communes of the Jura department
