= Savigny-en-Revermont =

- Commune
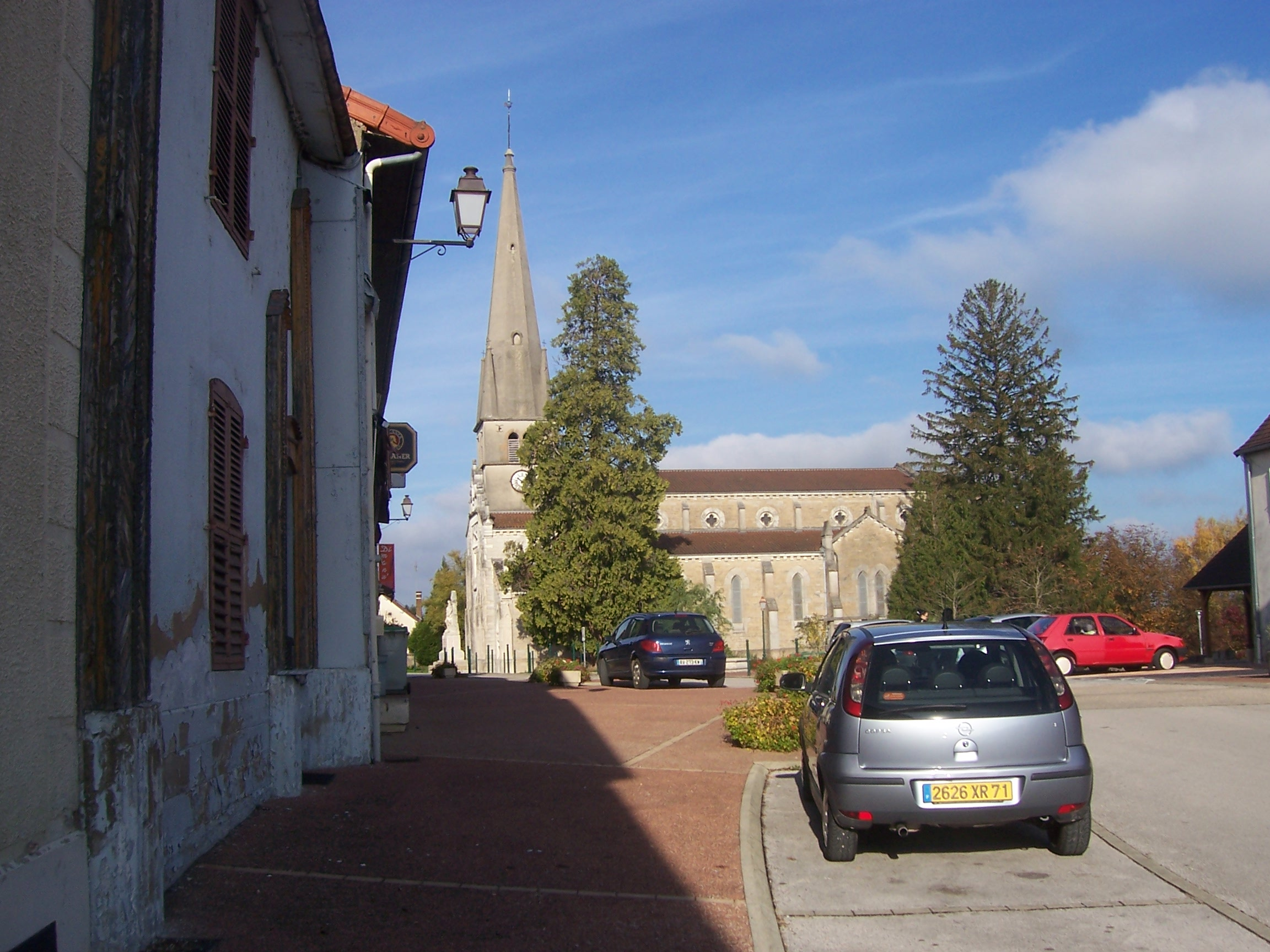
- The church in Savigny-en-Revermont

- Coat of arms
- Location of Savigny-en-Revermont
- Location within France Location within Bourgogne-Franche-Comté
- Coordinates: 46°38′06″N 5°25′19″E
- Country: France
- Region: Bourgogne-Franche-Comté
- Department: Saône-et-Loire
- Arrondissement: Louhans
- Canton: Pierre-de-Bresse

Government
  - Mayor (2020–2026): Robert Goyot
- Area^{1}: 27.21 km^{2} (10.51 sq mi)
- Elevation: 205 m (673 ft)
- Highest elevation: 223 m (732 ft)
- Lowest elevation: 188 m (617 ft)
- Population (2023): 1,152
  - Density: 42.34/km^{2} (109.7/sq mi)
- Time zone: UTC+01:00 (CET)
  - Summer (DST): UTC+02:00 (CEST)
- INSEE/Postal code: 71506 /71580
- ^{1} French Land Register data, which excludes lakes, ponds, glaciers > 1 km^{2} (0.386 sq mi or 247 acres) and river estuaries.

Savigny-en-Revermont is a commune in the Saône-et-Loire department in the region of Bourgogne-Franche-Comté in eastern France.

== Geography ==
The Vallière flows southwest through the commune's eastern part and forms part of its southwestern border.

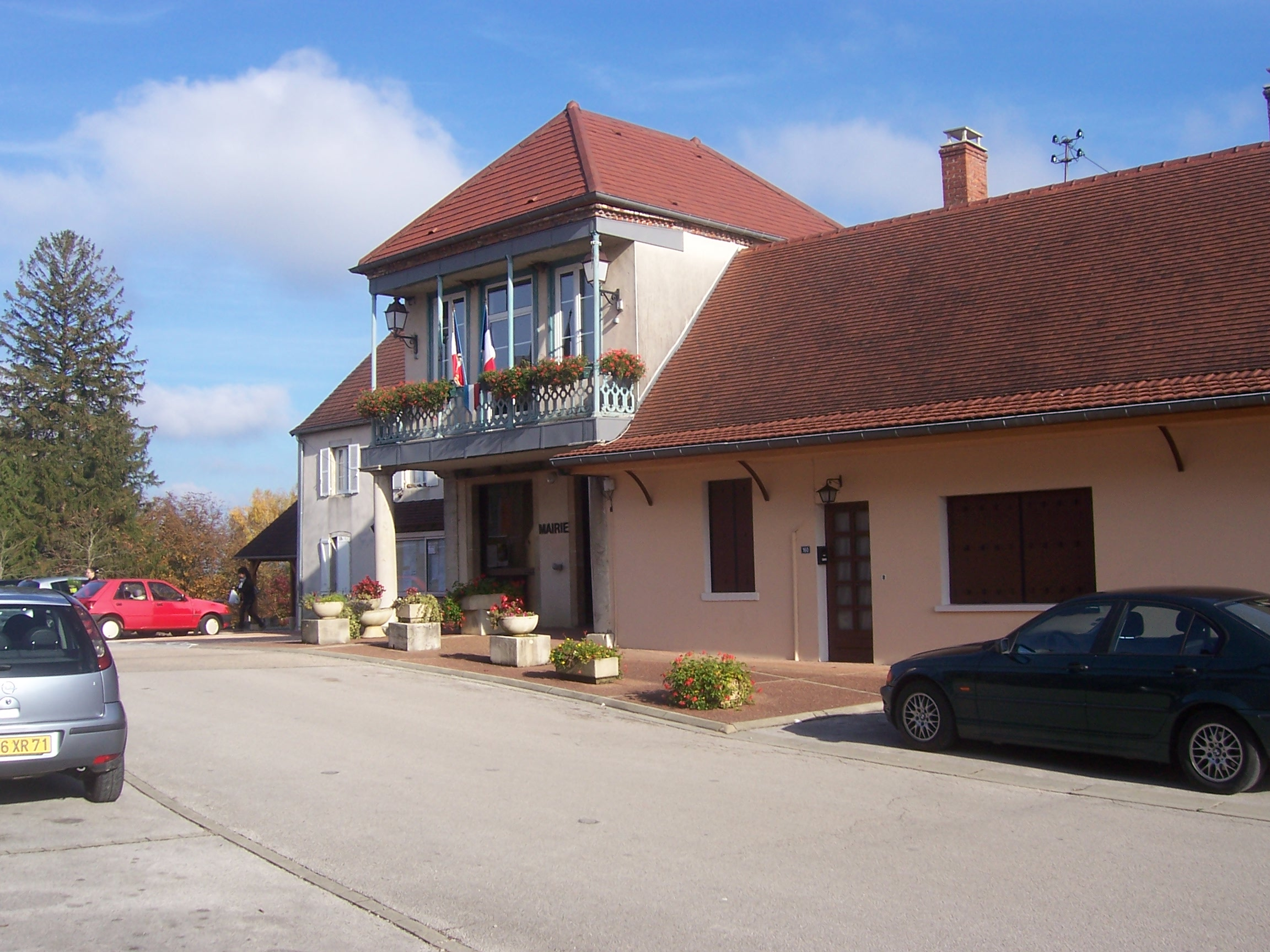
Town hall

== See also ==
- Communes of the Saône-et-Loire department
