= Mestre de camp =

Mestre de camp or Maître de camp (French pronunciation: [mɛːtʁə də kɑ̃]; "camp-master") was a military rank in the Ancien Régime of France, equivalent to colonel. A mestre de camp commanded a regiment and was under the authority of a Colonel General, who commanded all the regiments in one "arme". The rank also existed in Portugal and Spain, as maestre de campo or mestre de campo.

When the role of infantry colonel general was abolished in 1661, the mestre de camp took the title of colonel. The cavalry regiments, on the other hand, remained under the authority of a colonel general, were commanded individually by mestres de camp until the French Revolution. The rank of mestre de camp was demonstrated by wearing a pair of épaulettes with gilded or silver fringes.

The rank was abolished during the French Revolution and replaced by that of chef de brigade.

== Purchase of Mestre de camp rank ==
Until the late 18th century, certain regiments of the French cavalry could be, with the King's permission, "purchased", i.e. the right to command the regiment could be transmitted from an individual to another, usually with monetary compensation. The buyer, if he had prior service as an officer, was promoted ipso facto mestre de camp. In certain cases, the King let the regiment pass from father to son, like a patrimonial estate. Consequently, scions of the high aristocracy could gain the rank at a very young age and thus be in a good position to obtain promotions (by seniority) to the rank of brigadier. For example, Jacques FitzJames inherited FitzJames' Regiment at 15 in 1759, allowing him to be promoted Brigadier at 25 in 1769.

== Variants of the rank ==
- Mestre de camp commandant : when a regiment had several mestres de camp in its staff, the commander of the regiment had the title of mestre de camp commandant
- Mestre de camp en second : when a regiment had several mestres de camp in its staff, the deputy commander of the regiment had the title of mestre de camp en second
- Mestre de camp lieutenant : when the King was nominal commander of a regiment, the actual commander had the title of mestre de camp lieutenant
- Mestre de camp à la suite : when a mestre de camp had no command but was positioned in a regiment's staff, he had the title of mestre de camp à la suite
- Mestre de camp réformé : mestre de camp without position in the army.
