= Bugey =

Historical region in France

Coordinates: 45°55′N 5°37′E

The Bugey (French pronunciation: [byʒɛ], [byʒe]; Arpitan: Bugê) is a historical region in the department of Ain, eastern France, located between Lyon and Geneva. It is located in a loop of the Rhône River in the southeast of the department. It includes the foothills of the Jura Mountains, and the highest point is the Grand Colombier. Bugey is divided into two sub-regions: Haut Bugey and Bas Bugey. The inhabitants of Bugey are known as Bugistes or alternatively as Bugeysiens.

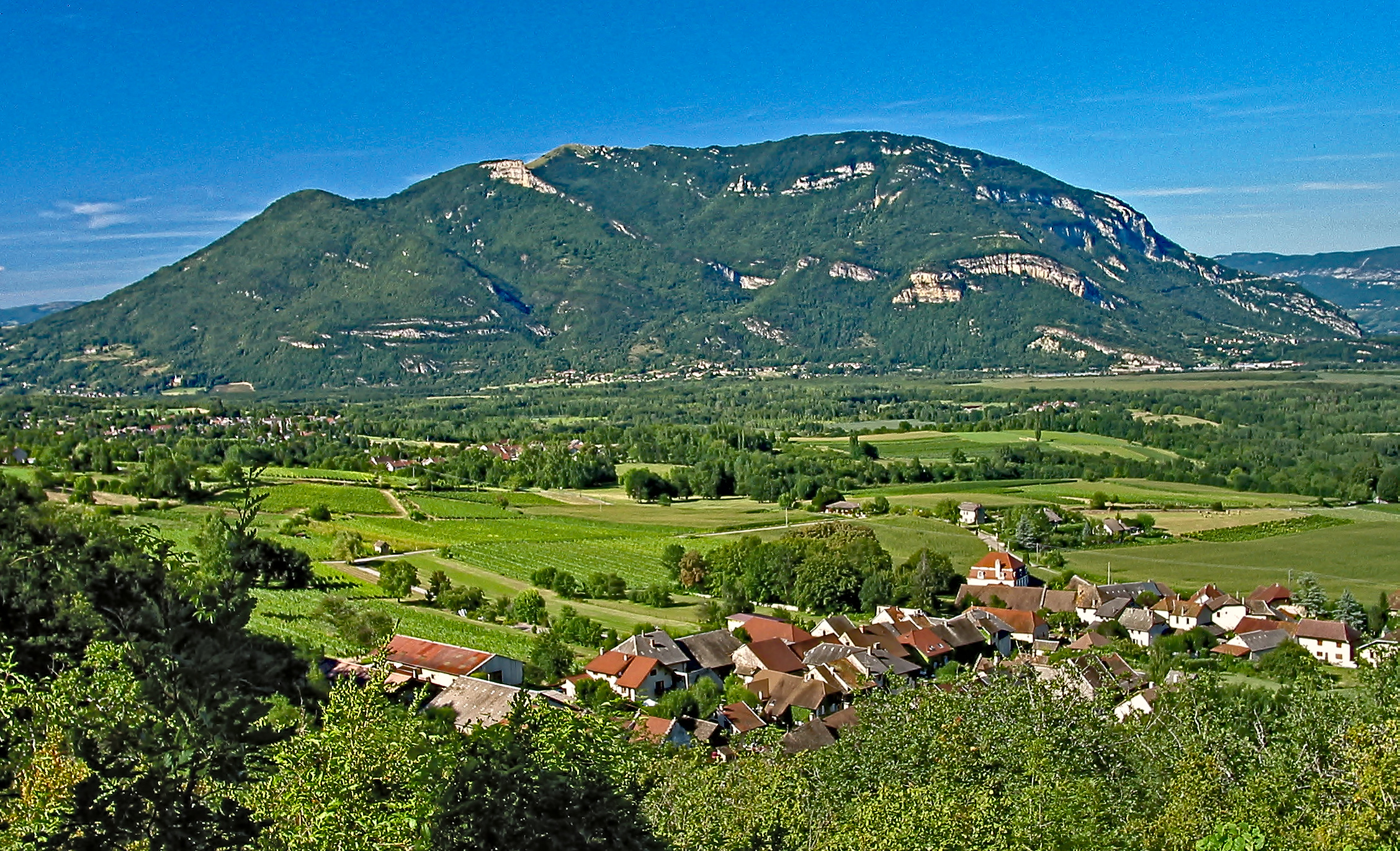
Grand Colombier

== History ==
The Bugey was a fief of the Holy Roman Empire. When Emperor Henry IV received the much-needed support of Adelaide of Susa, marchesa of Turin, when he came to Italy to submit to Pope Gregory VII and Matilda of Tuscany at Canossa, in return for her permission to travel through her lands, Henry gave Bugey to Adelaide. Henceforth it belonged to the House of Savoy until 1601, when it was ceded to France by the Treaty of Lyon.

== Geography ==
Bugey is delimited by the Rhone in the south and east and by the Ain in the west. The northern boundary of Bugey is disputed. In 1867 Baron Achille Raverat declared the Valserine to be the northern border of Bugey, but contemporary definitions generally include the entire Ain department as part of Bugey. The region of Revermont has never been considered part of Bugey.

== Culture ==
The residents of rural areas in the Bugey, Valromey, and Chautagne speak Savorêt, a dialect of the Arpitan language, and spoke it in everyday life until the 1970s.

The area is known for its wine, Bugey AOC.

== See also ==
- Bugey Nuclear Power Plant
- Bugey wine
- Ligne du Haut-Bugey, railroad line
