= Second conquest of Franche-Comté =

French conquest of Franche-Comté during the Dutch War (1673–1674)

Second Conquest of Franche-Comté
- Part of Wars of Louis XIV
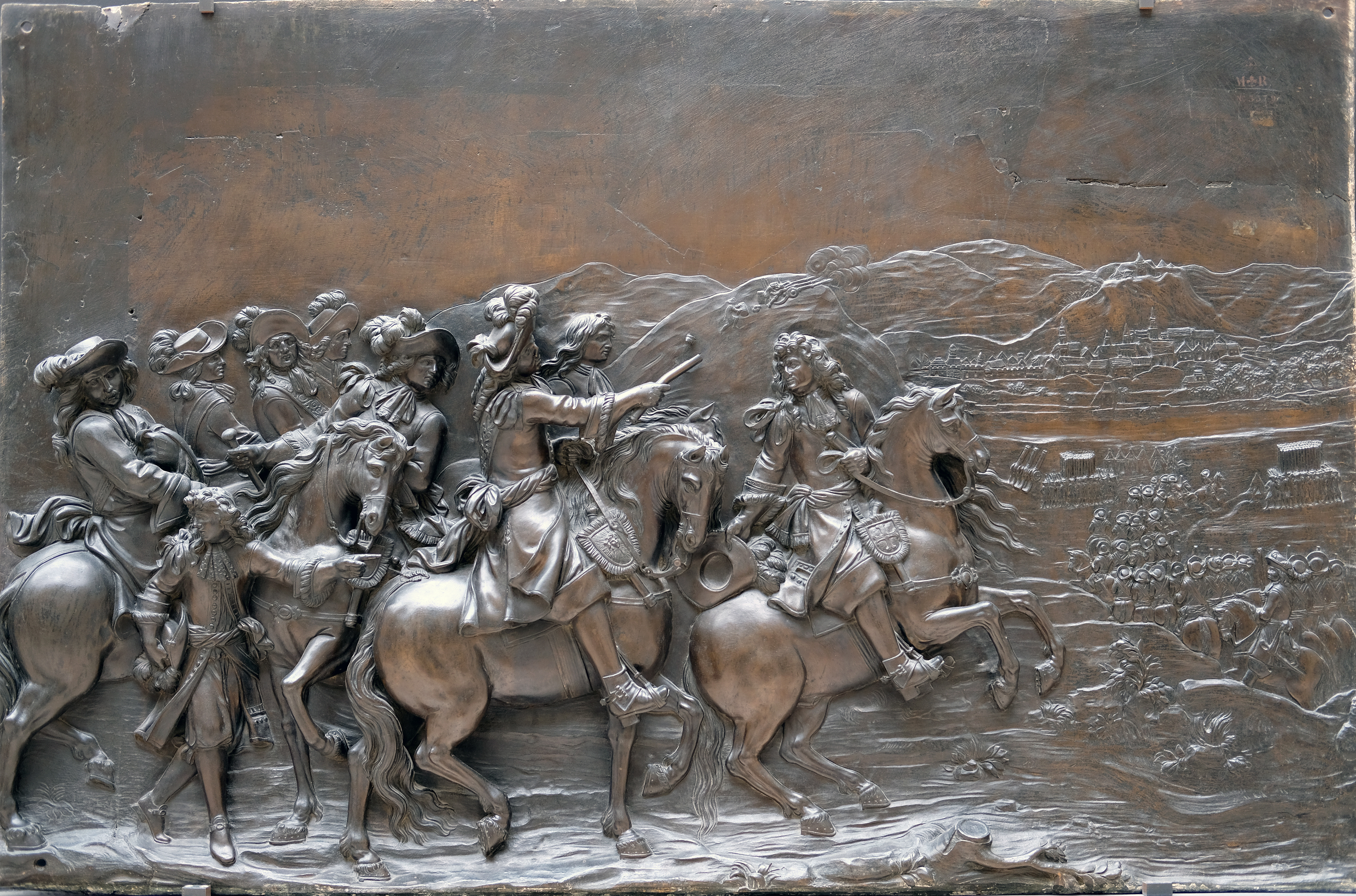
- Bas-relief The Conquest of Franche-Comté, by Martin Desjardins (Louvre Museum); in the background, the city of Besançon.
Date	12 October 1673 – 10 July 1674
Location	County of Burgundy; Kingdom of France
Result	French victory Treaties of Nijmegen
Territorial changes	Annexation of Franche-Comté

Belligerents
Kingdom of France; Comtois rebels	County of Burgundy; Holy Roman Empire; Spanish Empire

Commanders and leaders
Louis XIV; Louis de Bourbon-Condé; Philippe de Navailles; Sébastien de Vauban; Jacques Henri de Durfort; Henri-Jules de Bourbon-Condé; Philippe de Lorraine; François de Montmorency; François d'Aubusson de la Feuillade; François de La Mothe-Villebert d'Aspremont; Louis de Clermont d'Amboise de Renel; Nicolas Bautru de Vaubrun; Claude de Bauffremont de Listenois; Jean-François de Lavier; Jean-Jacques d'Oiselet de Chantrans	Francisco González d'Alveida; Juan Domingo de Zuñiga y Fonseca; Jean-François de Massiet; Francisco de Ravira; André de Riverol; Charles-Henri de Lorraine-Vaudémont; Sigismond d'Este de Borgomanero; Paul-François de Saint-Mauris; Prosper-Ambroise de Precipiano; Jacques-Antoine de Maisod; Charles-Eugène Schmidt; Lacuzon; Guillaume de Pontamougeard; Claude de Mâcon d'Esboz; Philippe Merceret de Mérona; Antoine Poly de Saint-Thiébaud; Claude Balland

Strength
25,000 men	10,000 men Approximately 2,200 men Approximately 1,200 men

Casualties and losses
Between 7,000 and 10,000 dead or wounded	Between 7,000 and 8,000 dead or wounded

The second conquest of Franche-Comté, also known as the definitive conquest of Franche-Comté, was a military campaign during the Dutch War that took place in the Franche-Comté region from 12 October 1673 to 10 July 1674, culminating in the capture of the Château de Sainte-Anne. This conflict pitted France against the County of Burgundy, then a possession of the Spanish House of Habsburg and part of the Holy Roman Empire. After a nine-month campaign, France annexed Franche-Comté through the Treaties of Nijmegen in 1678, ending the war and securing the region.

== Background ==
=== External causes of the war ===
Following the War of Devolution (1667–1668), Louis XIV sought to dismantle the Triple Alliance of The Hague of 1668, particularly targeting the Dutch Republic, to pursue his claims to Spanish territories, which he considered his inheritance through his father-in-law, Philip IV of Spain. Despite France's protectionist tariffs of 1664 and 1667, Dutch merchants remained formidable competitors to French trade. A victory over the Dutch Republic would mitigate this economic rivalry. Louvois, who had led the French War Department since 1670, advocated for war to showcase his organizational skills and to rival prominent French generals like Condé and Turenne. Additionally, the Dutch Republic's Protestant government had provoked Louis XIV by issuing medals mocking the Catholic French monarch, which he perceived as an affront to French honor.

The French had previously conquered the County of Burgundy in just two weeks during the War of Devolution but were forced to return it under the Treaty of Aix-la-Chapelle (1668).

=== Franche-Comté after the first conquest of 1668 ===
The County of Burgundy was left in disarray after the 1668 conquest. Riots, some deadly, erupted in major cities, with the populace accusing local parliamentarians of surrendering the province to the French. Spain, angered by the lack of resistance, appointed non-native governors, such as Don Geronimo de Quinones, who was ordered by Madrid to bar locals from high-ranking positions. During the War of Devolution, the war-weary County of Burgundy, exhausted from the Ten Years War, offered little resistance to the French. Spain's distrust of local loyalty was later disproved by fierce resistance in places like Faucogney.

=== The Marquis de Listenois' conspiracy ===
In response to Spain's exclusionary policies, the pro-French Marquis de Listenois orchestrated a coup to seize power. Planned in a Besançon inn, the plot was exposed, forcing the conspirators to flee. The Marquis fled to the Jura, aiming to reach France via Bresse. In Lons-le-Saunier, he rallied about 400 armed peasants and locals. The failed coup polarized the region: Dole, Conliège, and Courlaoux rebelled against their Spanish garrisons, while Besançon condemned the conspiracy. On 13 February, the governor called on the populace to oppose the Marquis, rallying support for the Spanish cause.

=== Battle of Saint-Lothain ===
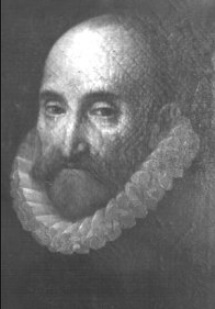
Claude Prost de Lacuzon

Captain Lacuzon, a staunch supporter of Spanish rule, was stationed at the Château de Sainte-Anne. He recruited extensively to bolster his forces and was joined by a Spanish cavalry regiment led by Colonel Jean-François de Massiet from the Spanish Netherlands. Moving toward Poligny, they pursued the rebels. On 16 February, the governor issued an edict ordering the conspirators to disband or face attack. Frightened, the Marquis retreated toward France but, learning of the pursuit, turned to confront his pursuers at Saint-Lothain on 25 February 1673. Caught off guard while resting, his forces were defeated by Lacuzon and Massiet. The Marquis and a few loyalists escaped to France, later joining the French army, with the Marquis participating in the Siege of Vesoul. The victory resonated widely, celebrated even in the Spanish Netherlands, cementing Lacuzon's status as a symbol of anti-French resistance.

=== Consequences and war preparations ===
The Saint-Lothain victory solidified local support for Spain, leading to heroic resistance in cities like Salins, Besançon, and Arbois. However, Spanish governors grew authoritarian, imposing heavy taxes to fortify defenses in anticipation of a French return. On 26 April, Governor Quinones, deemed too lenient, was replaced by Francisco d'Alveida. As early as February 1672, rumors of war spurred fortification efforts. Dole's mayor ordered all residents, including clergy, to contribute to these works, though the Spanish governor had no intention of defending Dole seriously.

On 6 September, a French soldier was caught conducting military reconnaissance. By 22 September, the governor ordered militia mobilization. The vicomte-mayor Étienne Bonnot proposed swearing allegiance to Spain, vowing to resist the French. On 12 October, the governor of the Spanish Netherlands, Count of Monterrey, declared war on France, drawing Franche-Comté into the conflict.

== Allied Forces in Franche-Comté ==
=== Chain of Command ===
In early 1674, the allied command structure was as follows:

- Governor Juan Domingo de Monterrey
  - Governor Francisco González d'Alveida, commander-in-chief
    - Field Marshal Charles-Henri de Lorraine-Vaudémont, second-in-command
      - Colonel Sigismond d'Este de Borgomanero, Dole sector
      - Colonel Jean-François de Massiet, Amont bailiwick
      - Colonel Guillaume de Pontamougeard, Salins sector
      - Colonel Paul-François de Saint-Mauris, Besançon
      - Colonel Jacques-Antoine de Maisod, Saint-Claude sector
      - Colonel François Chappuis, initially Vesoul, later Salins
      - Colonel Albert-Eugène de Lullin, Lons-le-Saunier
      - Colonel Philippe Merceret de Méronna, Arbois
      - Colonel Prosper-Ambroise de Precipiano, Besançon forts
        - Sergeant Major André de Riverol, Pesmes
          - Captain Francisco de Ravira, Faucogney
          - Captain Claude Balland, Fort Sainte-Anne
          - Captain Claude de Mâcon d'Esboz, Vesoul
          - Captain Claude Prost de Lacuzon, Mont-sous-Vaudrey
          - Captain Camille de Féruffin, Luxeuil
          - Captain Antoine Poly de Saint-Thiébaud, Orgelet
          - Captain Miland Paponet de Raumont, Poligny

=== Allied Troops ===
The allied forces comprised approximately 10,000 Comtois soldiers, half of whom were professional soldiers, the rest militiamen. About 2,200 Spanish cavalry and 1,000 Imperial troops were stationed in small garrisons at Dole, Gray, Salins, and Besançon.

== French Army ==
=== Chain of Command ===
In early 1674, the French command structure was as follows:

- Louis XIV
  - François-Michel le Tellier de Louvois
    - Philippe de Montaut-Bénac de Navailles
      - Sébastien de Vauban
      - Jacques Henri de Durfort
      - Henri-Jules de Bourbon-Condé
      - Philippe de Lorraine
      - François de Montmorency
      - François d'Aubusson de la Feuillade
      - François de La Mothe-Villebert d'Aspremont
      - Louis de Clermont d'Amboise de Renel

== Course of the conflict ==
=== Early Comtois successes (12 October 1673 – 11 February 1674) ===
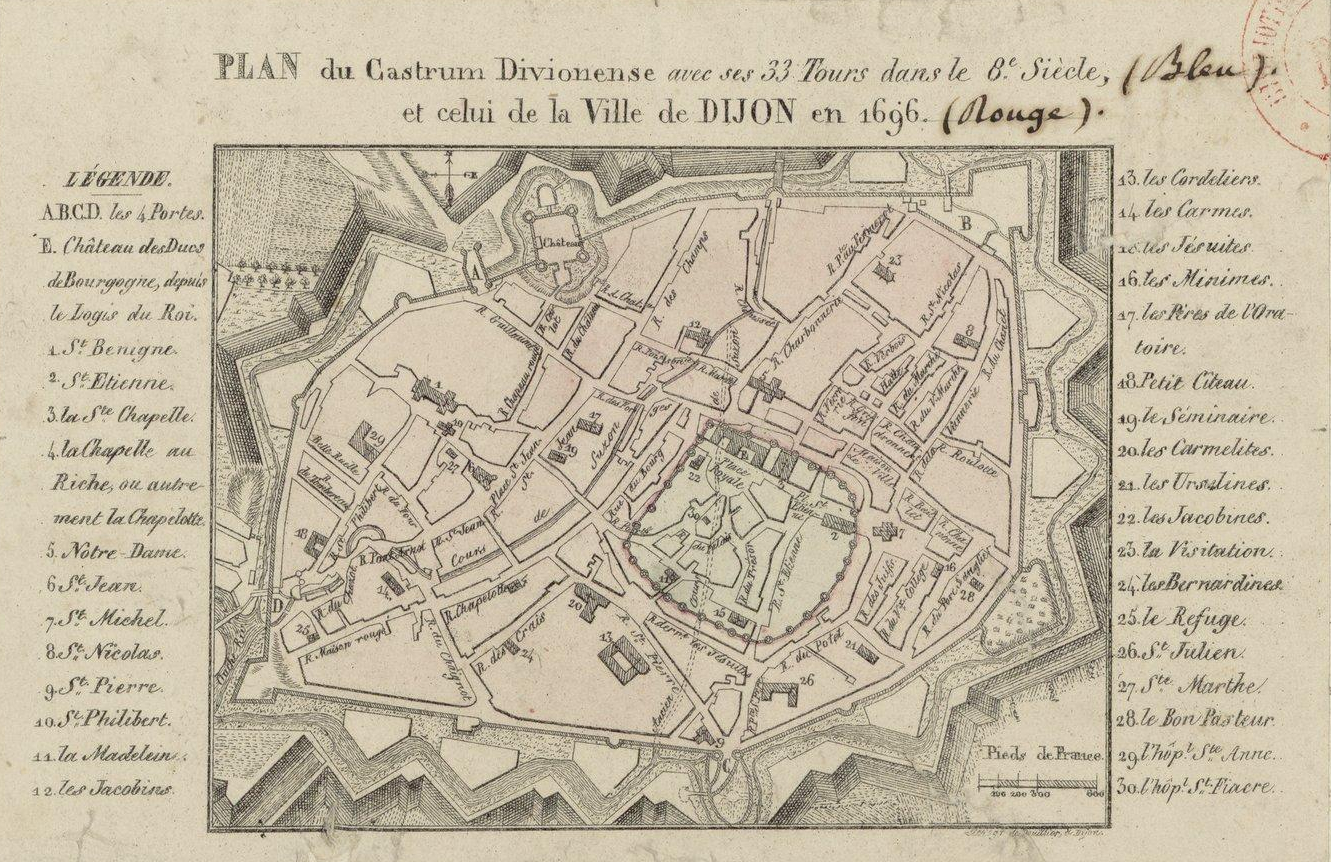
Dijon in the 17th century

==== Comtois' offensives in Burgundy and Champagne (November 1673) ====
In November 1673, the Brussels war council launched preemptive raids into Burgundy and Champagne, led by Walloon officer Colonel de Massiet. With 1,400 men, Massiet captured Mirebeau, pillaging the region. On 20 November, he reached Dijon, where hastily repaired walls and determined resistance repelled the inexperienced Comtois recruits. Despite failing at Dijon, the offensive secured and plundered the area between Gray and Dijon. Another raid targeted Fayl-Billot in southern Champagne, capturing the town and its surroundings. Raids even reached Langres, terrifying its inhabitants.

The French counterattacked around 25 November, capturing Courlaoux but failing at Saint-Amour and Lons-le-Saunier. Lacuzon sought to pursue the retreating French, but his superior, the pro-French Marquis de Lullin, ordered him to hold position.

==== Northeastern battles and the Arcey massacre (December 1673 – February 1674) ====
In December, fortification efforts intensified at Gray, Salins, Dole, and Sainte-Anne. On 23 December, Captain Poly de Saint-Thiébaud repelled a French offensive at Beaufort despite being outnumbered. Massiet's subsequent assault on southern Alsace routed French detachments and plundered villages around Belfort, though he was repelled by its artillery. The French responded decisively, with the Marquis de Vaubrun ordering Colonel de Vascal to attack the eastern County of Burgundy. This led to the Arcey Massacre, where peasants refusing to surrender were burned alive in a church tower. The massacre fueled anti-French sentiment, boosting Comtois' morale. In February, Comtois militiamen massacred a French garrison at Pont-de-Roide, shouting "Death to the butchers of Arcey!". Ambushes intensified, turning the French Alsace offensive into a defeat.

On 11 February, Massiet reported a large French army at Dijon, but the governor, confident in flooded rivers and winter conditions, did not respond.

=== French campaign of 1674 (12 February – 10 July) ===
==== First phase: Conquest of the Amont Bailiwick (12 February – 7 March 1674) ====
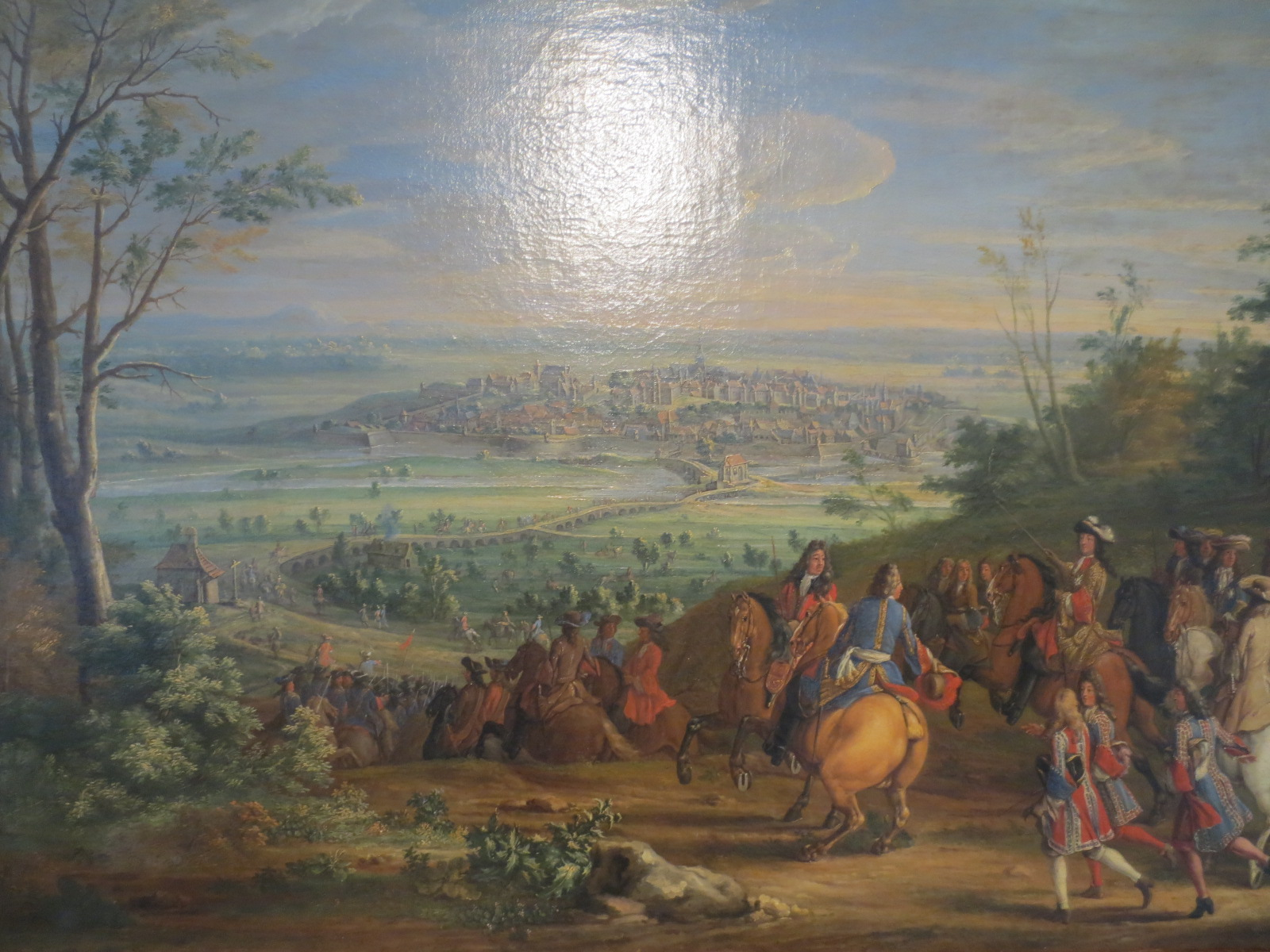
Siege of Gray, February 1674

With 10,000 men, the Duke of Navailles targeted Pesmes, Gy, Marnay, Saint-Loup, Vesoul, and Gray. On 12 February, French cavalry crossed the border at Broye-les-Pesmes. Pesmes' governor, André de Riverol, surrendered on 15 February after minimal resistance, surprising the Comtois who believed the flooded river offered protection. The French seized significant supplies, opening the route to Gray and Marnay.

On 23 February, Navailles left Pesmes, reaching Gray-la-Ville by evening. Gray was encircled by 24 February and, despite valiant sorties, Massiet surrendered on 28 February. Navailles split his forces, sending one to Marnay and another, led by the Duke of La Feuillade and the Marquis de Listenois, to Vesoul. Vesoul's commander, Claude François de Mâcon d'Esboz, engaged French advance units at Scey-sur-Saône, fighting street battles before retreating to Chariez. By 4 March, Vesoul faced a French siege. A French agent, Labbé, undermined morale, leading to the city's surrender on 7 March. Mâcon d'Esboz escaped with his men, later fighting at Faucogney. Luxeuil repelled a French assault, but Saint-Loup, Marnay, Oiselay, and Rigney fell.

==== Second phase: First assault on the Aval Bailiwick (10 March – 3 April 1674) ====
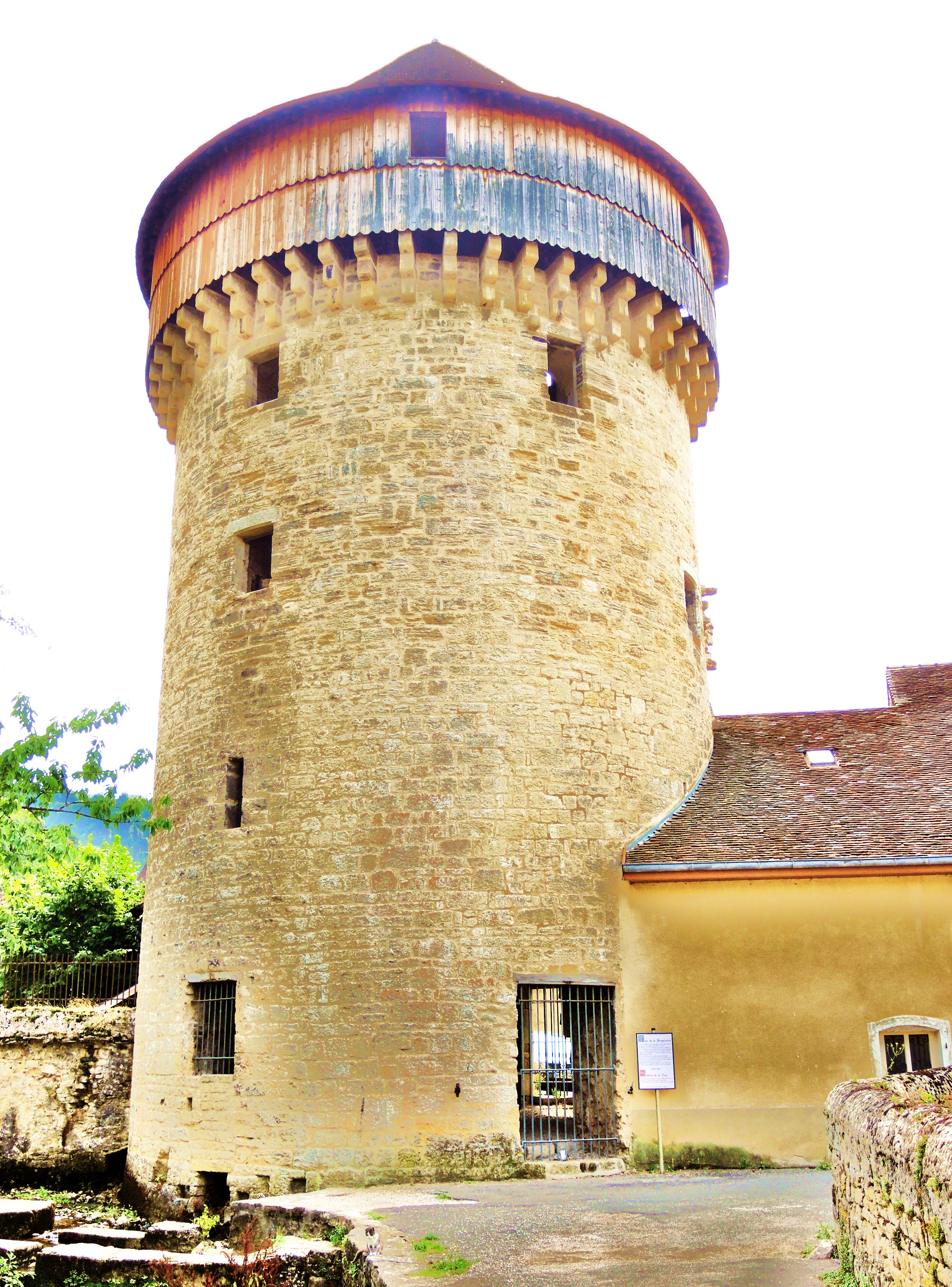
Remnants of Poligny's fortifications

In March, French forces targeted the Aval Bailiwick, aiming for Lons-le-Saunier, Orgelet, Poligny, Salins, and Arbois. Lons-le-Saunier surrendered on 10 March, lacking defenders. Arbois' mayor requested reinforcements, but Governor d'Alveida refused, redirecting its garrison to Salins. On 19 March, Lieutenant-Colonel Philippe Merceret de Mérona was sent to organize Arbois' defense, despite its weak walls and militia-only forces. Orgelet fell quickly on 23 March, followed by Poligny after two days. The French, led by Viscount d'Aspremont, targeted Arbois, expecting an easy victory. However, determined resistance repelled French assaults, forcing a retreat on 31 March. The Prince of Vaudémont entered Arbois triumphantly on 1 April, nearly recapturing Poligny. A Comtois tercio under Jacques-Antoine de Maisod retook Orgelet, massacring or capturing its French garrison.

==== Third phase: Main offensive on Besançon and Dole (19 April – 6 June 1674) ====
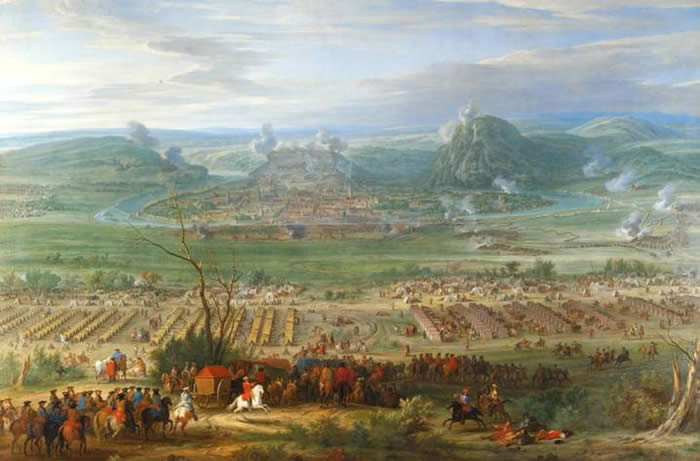
Siege of Besançon, 1674

In mid-April, Louis XIV targeted Besançon and the Bailliage du Milieu, avoiding Dole due to its resistance in 1636. Besançon and Salins held most Comtois troops. Vauban advised attacking Besançon first, which Louvois approved. From 25 April to 5 May, 15,000–20,000 French troops, led by the Duke of Enghien, besieged Besançon. Despite fierce resistance and sorties, minimal reinforcements arrived, and the city capitulated on 15 May, retaining its privileges as in 1668. Ornans and Pontarlier surrendered on 5 and 8 May, respectively. On 26 May, Enghien besieged Dole, defended by 3,000 men under Sigismond d'Este, Marquis of Borgomanero. After heavy bombardment and a breach on 6 June, Dole surrendered.

==== Fourth phase: Second assault on the Aval Bailiwick and capture of Salins (4 – 21 June 1674) ====
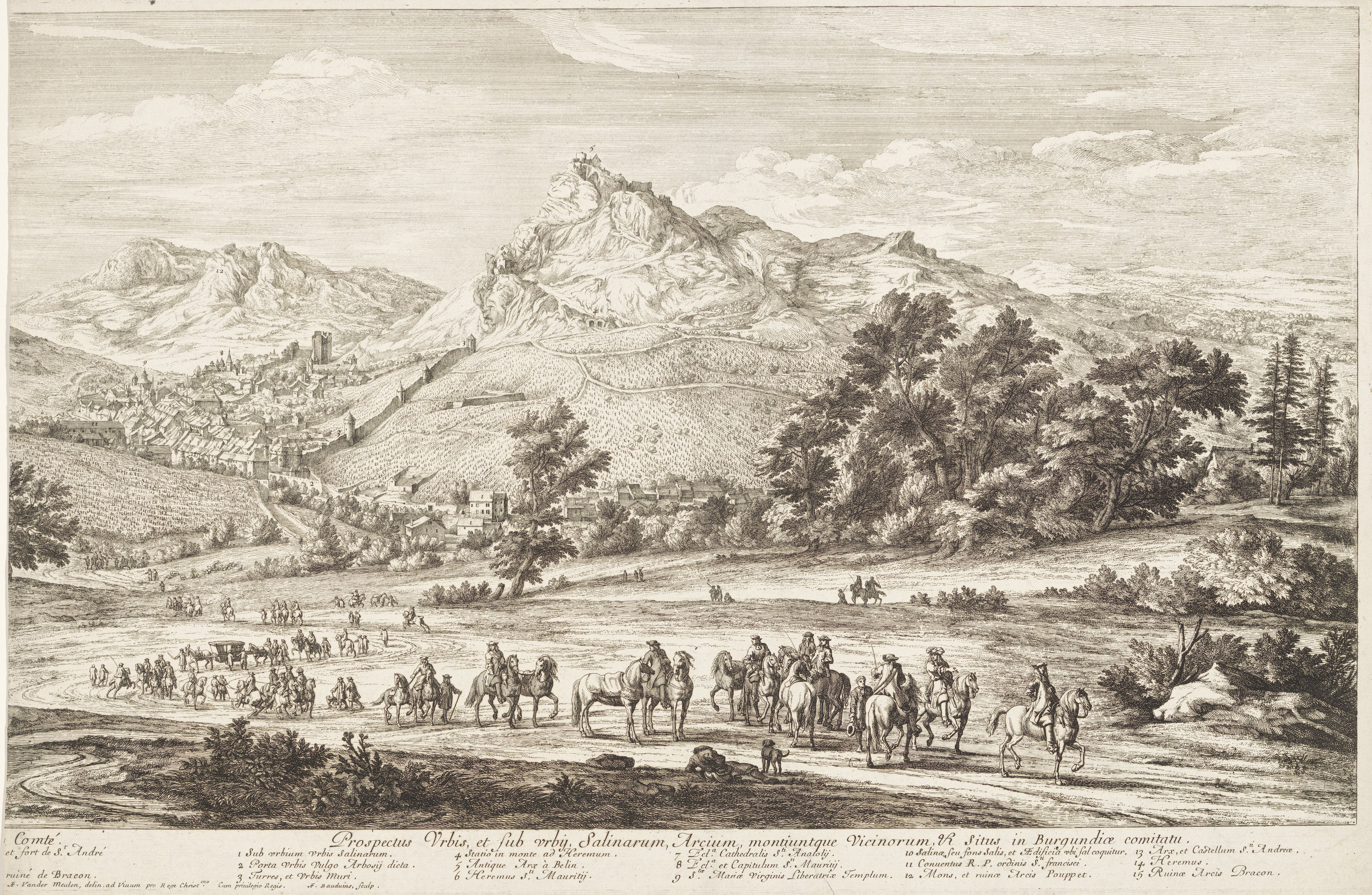
Salins in the late 17th century

After Dole's fall, Louis XIV returned to Paris, leaving the Duke of La Feuillade in command. The French targeted Salins, a key economic and military center with 3,000 defenders against 11,000 French troops. On 4 June, the French seized and burned the Carmes convent and suburbs. Initial Comtois resistance from forts like Guyon repelled French advances. However, on 20 June, a fire at Fort Saint-André triggered panic, leading to the abandonment of multiple forts. Despite continued resistance, Salins capitulated on 21 June after negotiations, with Lacuzon defiantly firing from the Cicon tower. The siege was the costliest for France, with 2,000–3,000 deaths compared to a few hundred Comtois losses, marking the fall of the last major Comtois stronghold.

==== Completion of the Amont Bailiwick conquest (1 – 4 July 1674) ====
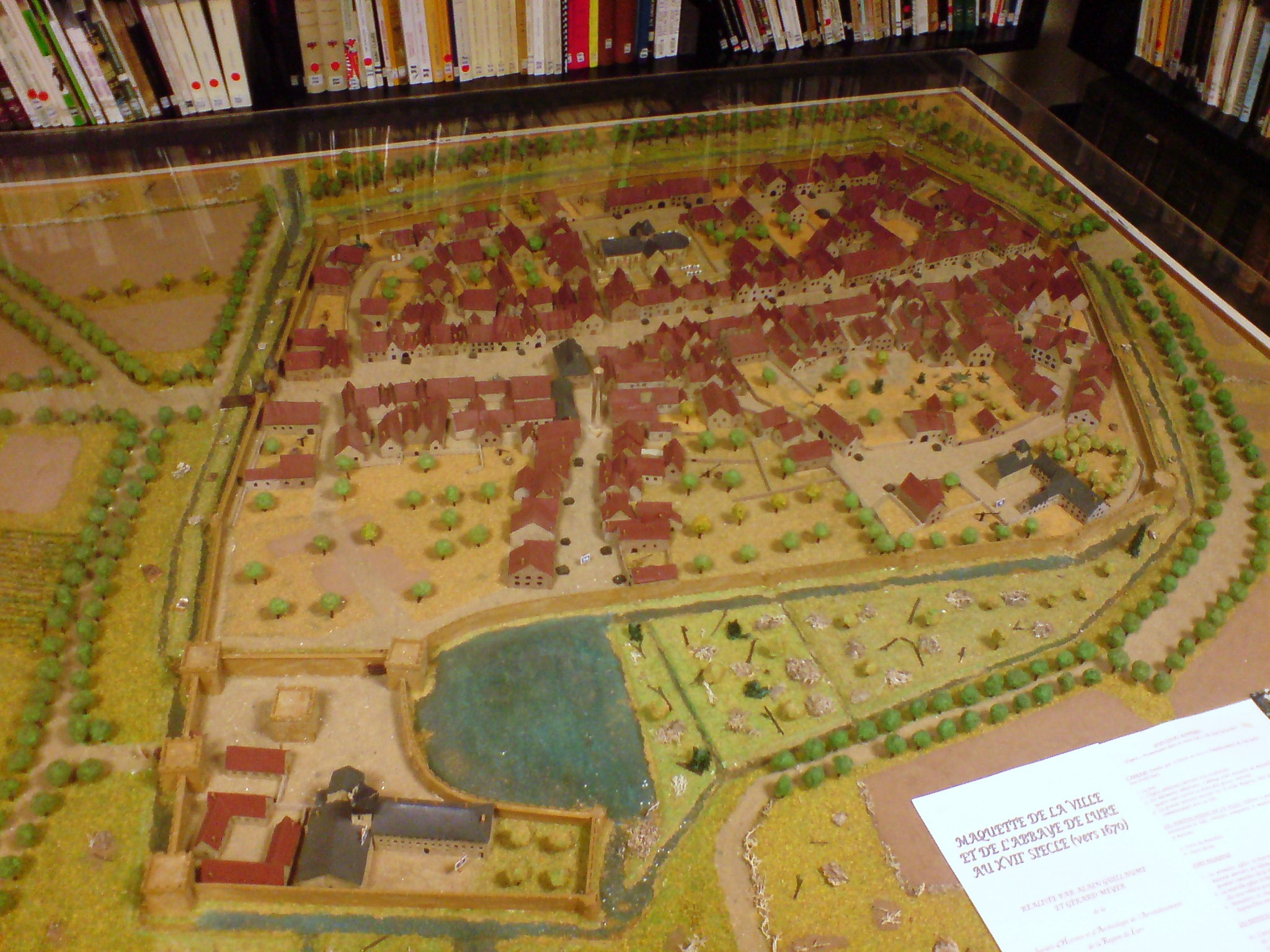
Lure around 1670

Luxeuil fell on 1 July without resistance, followed by Lure after a brief siege. Faucogney, led by Francisco de Ravira and Claude de Mâcon d'Esboz, resisted fiercely on 3 July, repelling initial French assaults. A breach on 4 July allowed French entry, leading to widespread pillaging and atrocities. Ravira surrendered, concluding the Amont Bailiwick's conquest.

==== Completion of the Aval Bailiwick conquest (2 – 10 July 1674) ====
The French retook eastern Aval Bailiwick, including Poligny and Orgelet, with Arbois falling on 11 June. Saint-Claude surrendered on 2 July, followed by the Château de Joux on 4 July. The Sainte-Anne fortress, commanded by Claude Balland, resisted until 10 July, when a breach and dwindling munitions forced a discreet evacuation.

== Aftermath ==
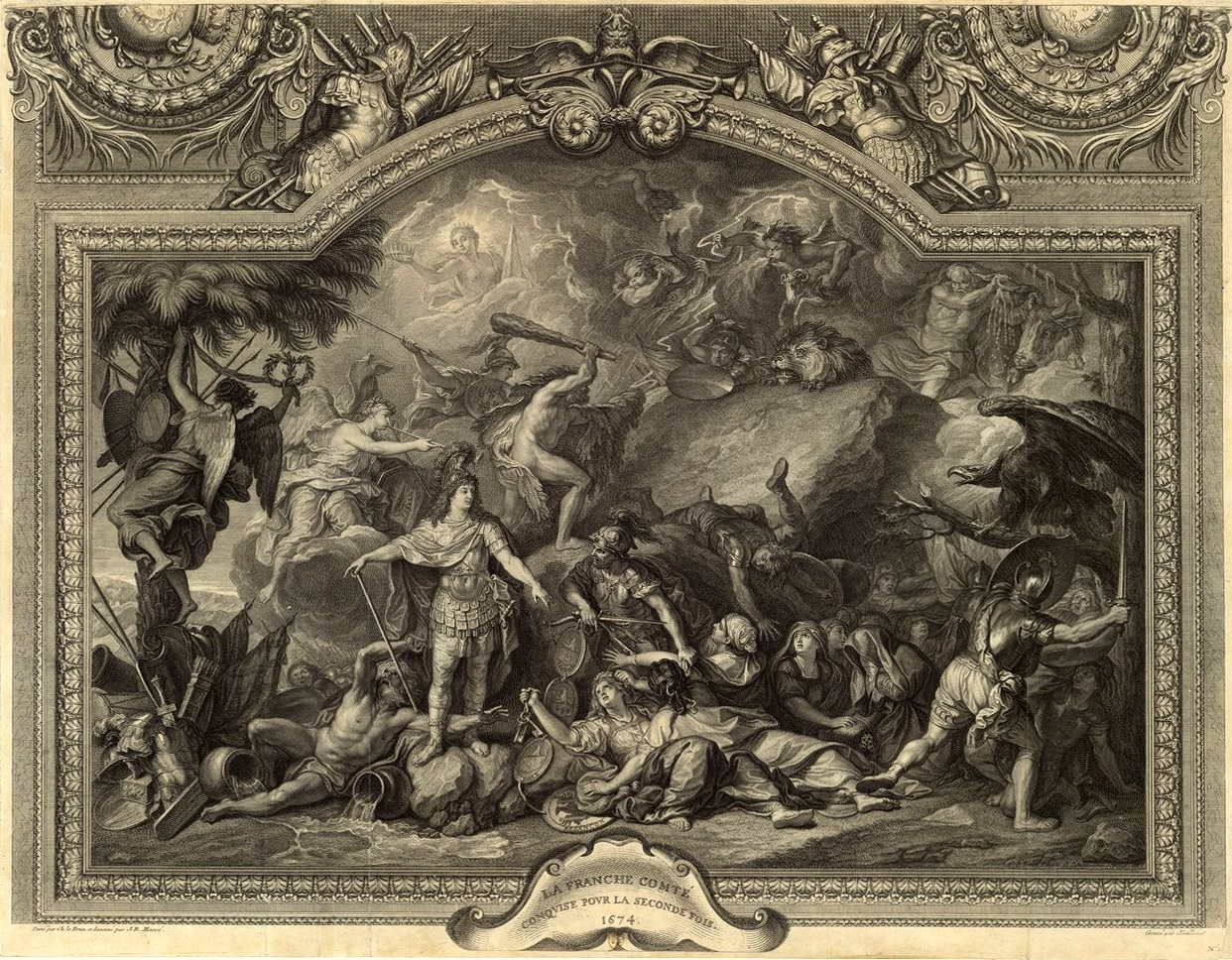
The Franche-Comté Conquered for the Second Time, 1674

The six-month campaign (compared to two weeks in 1668) permanently annexed the County of Burgundy to France as Franche-Comté. Post-1678, no major revolts occurred, but resistance persisted, particularly among peasants who buried their dead facing east or downward to protest French rule. Between 1702 and 1709, several plots were foiled, and French intendants faced hostility. Full acceptance of French rule took until the mid-18th century.

== See also ==
- Dutch War
- County of Burgundy
- Louis XIV
- Treaties of Nijmegen
- War of Devolution
- Triple Alliance (1668)
- Sébastien Le Prestre de Vauban
- Spanish Netherlands
