= Lacuzon =

Franc-Comtois leader (1607–1681)

Captain Claude Prost de Lacuzon
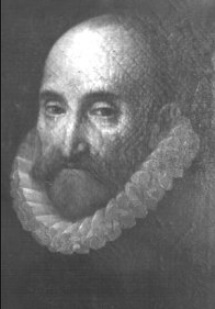
- Lacuzon
- Born: June 17, 1607; Longchaumois, Franche-Comté, Holy Roman Empire
- Died: December 21, 1681 (aged 74); Milan, Duchy of Milan, Spanish Empire
- Spouse: Jeanne Blanc
- Children: Anne-Marie and Jeanne-Claude
- Relatives: Pierre Prost (father); Clauda Jacquemain (mother); Denise Gobey
- Military career
- Allegiance: (County of Burgundy) Franche-Comté
- Service years: 1636–1678
- Rank: Captain
- Nickname: Lacuzon
- Conflicts: Ten Years' War: Capture of Saint-Laurent-la-Roche (1641); Battle of Maynal (1641); War of Devolution: First conquest of Franche-Comté; Franco-Dutch War: Second conquest of Franche-Comté

Lacuzon (Old French: la cuzon, "disturbance") or Claude Prost (June 17, 1607 – December 21, 1681) was a military leader from the County of Burgundy.

He was born at Longchaumois in what was then the County of Burgundy.

He gained his first military experience when the French invaded the County of Burgundy in 1636, harrying the French troops from the castles of Montaigu and Saint-Laurent-la-Roche, and devastating the frontier districts of Bresse and Bugey with fire and sword (1640–1642). In the first invasion of the County of Burgundy by Louis XIV in 1668 Lacuzon was unable to make any effective resistance, but he played an important part in Louis' second invasion.

In 1673 he defended Salins for some time; after the capitulation of the town he took refuge in the Duchy of Milan. He died at Milan on December 21, 1681.
