= Montmorot =

Commune in Bourgogne-Franche-Comté, France

- Commune
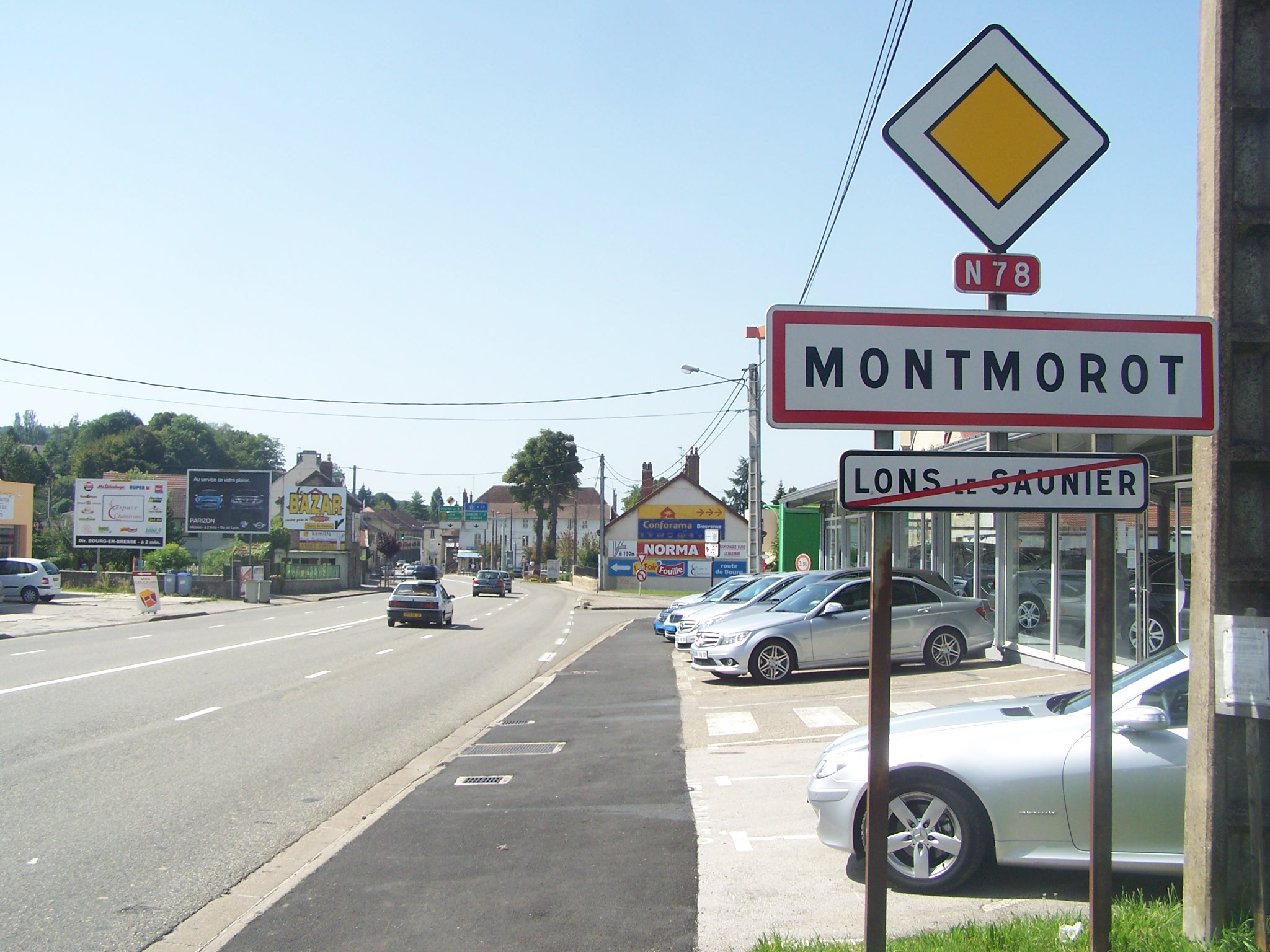
- The road into Montmorot

- Coat of arms
- Location of Montmorot
- Location within France Location within Bourgogne-Franche-Comté
- Coordinates: 46°40′37″N 5°31′50″E
- Country: France
- Region: Bourgogne-Franche-Comté
- Department: Jura
- Arrondissement: Lons-le-Saunier
- Canton: Lons-le-Saunier-1
- Intercommunality: Espace Communautaire Lons Agglomération

Government
  - Mayor (2020–2026): André Barbarin
- Area^{1}: 11.36 km^{2} (4.39 sq mi)
- Highest elevation: 355 m (1,165 ft)
- Lowest elevation: 223 m (732 ft)
- Population (2023): 3,261
  - Density: 287.1/km^{2} (743.5/sq mi)
- Time zone: UTC+01:00 (CET)
  - Summer (DST): UTC+02:00 (CEST)
- INSEE/Postal code: 39362 /39570
- ^{1} French Land Register data, which excludes lakes, ponds, glaciers > 1 km^{2} (0.386 sq mi or 247 acres) and river estuaries.

Montmorot (French pronunciation: [mɔ̃mɔʁo]) is a commune in the Jura department in Bourgogne-Franche-Comté in eastern France. It is a western suburb of Lons-le-Saunier.

== Geography ==
The Vallière flows west through the southern part of the commune and crosses the town.

== Population ==
Historical population

Year	Pop.	±% p.a.
1793	1,543	—
1800	1,549	+0.06%
1806	1,764	+2.19%
1821	1,555	−0.84%
1831	1,617	+0.39%
1836	1,803	+2.20%
1841	1,836	+0.36%
1846	1,946	+1.17%
1851	1,925	−0.22%
1856	1,733	−2.08%
1861	1,750	+0.20%
1866	1,959	+2.28%
1872	2,006	+0.40%
1876	1,955	−0.64%
1881	1,827	−1.35%
1886	1,812	−0.16%
1891	1,757	−0.61%
1896	1,702	−0.63%
1901	1,887	+2.09%

Year	Pop.	±% p.a.
1906	1,739	−1.62%
1911	1,792	+0.60%
1921	1,642	−0.87%
1926	1,838	+2.28%
1931	1,994	+1.64%
1936	2,064	+0.69%
1946	2,346	+1.29%
1954	2,344	−0.01%
1962	2,688	+1.73%
1968	2,792	+0.63%
1975	3,344	+2.61%
1982	3,320	−0.10%
1990	3,177	−0.55%
1999	3,090	−0.31%
2007	3,112	+0.09%
2012	3,038	−0.48%
2017	3,036	−0.01%
2023	3,261	+1.20%

Source: EHESS and INSEE (1968-2023)

== Notable people ==
- Agustín Fernando Muñoz y Sánchez, 1st Duke of Riánsares, morganitic husband of the Queen-Regent of Spain Maria Christina of the Two Sicilies, Duke of Rianzarès, was named Duke of Montmorot by Louis-Philippe I in 1847. The title is still honoured in Spain.

== See also ==
- Communes of the Jura department
