= Villeneuve-sous-Pymont =

- Commune
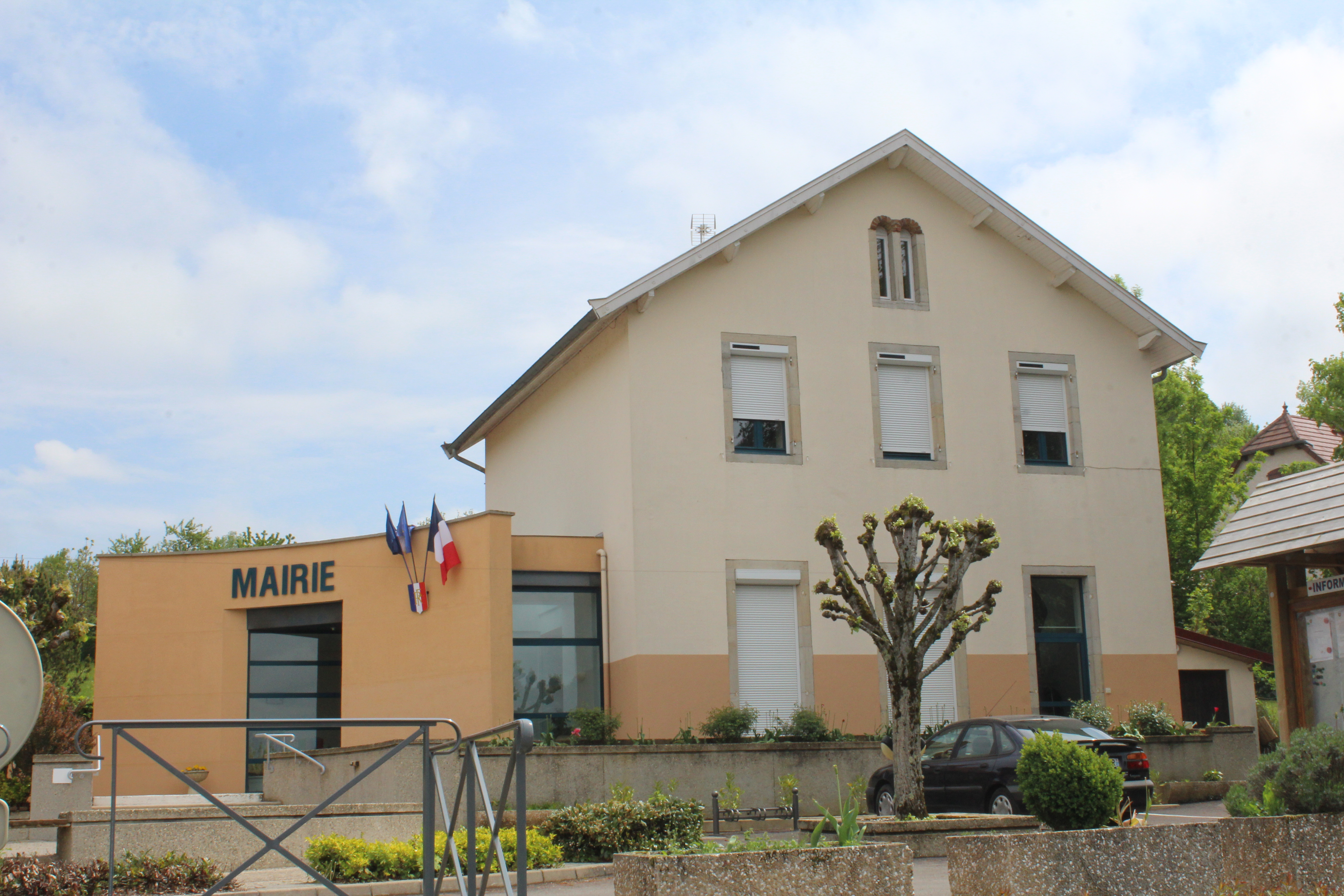
- The town hall in Villeneuve-sous-Pymont
- Location of Villeneuve-sous-Pymont
- Location within France Location within Bourgogne-Franche-Comté
- Coordinates: 46°41′32″N 5°33′05″E
- Country: France
- Region: Bourgogne-Franche-Comté
- Department: Jura
- Arrondissement: Lons-le-Saunier
- Canton: Lons-le-Saunier-1
- Intercommunality: Espace Communautaire Lons Agglomération

Government
  - Mayor (2020–2026): Claude Bourdy
- Area^{1}: 2.67 km^{2} (1.03 sq mi)
- Highest elevation: 390 m (1,280 ft)
- Lowest elevation: 260 m (850 ft)
- Population (2023): 317
  - Density: 119/km^{2} (308/sq mi)
- Time zone: UTC+01:00 (CET)
  - Summer (DST): UTC+02:00 (CEST)
- INSEE/Postal code: 39567 /39570
- ^{1} French Land Register data, which excludes lakes, ponds, glaciers > 1 km^{2} (0.386 sq mi or 247 acres) and river estuaries.

Villeneuve-sous-Pymont (French pronunciation: [vilnœv su pimɔ̃]) is a commune in the Jura department in the Bourgogne-Franche-Comté region in eastern France.

== Population ==
Historical population
Year	Pop.	±% p.a.
1968	124	—
1975	161	+3.80%
1982	234	+5.49%
1990	221	−0.71%
1999	217	−0.20%
2007	257	+2.14%
2012	279	+1.66%
2017	291	+0.85%
2023	317	+1.44%
Source: INSEE

== See also ==
- Communes of the Jura department
