= Chille =

Commune in Bourgogne-Franche-Comté, France

- Commune
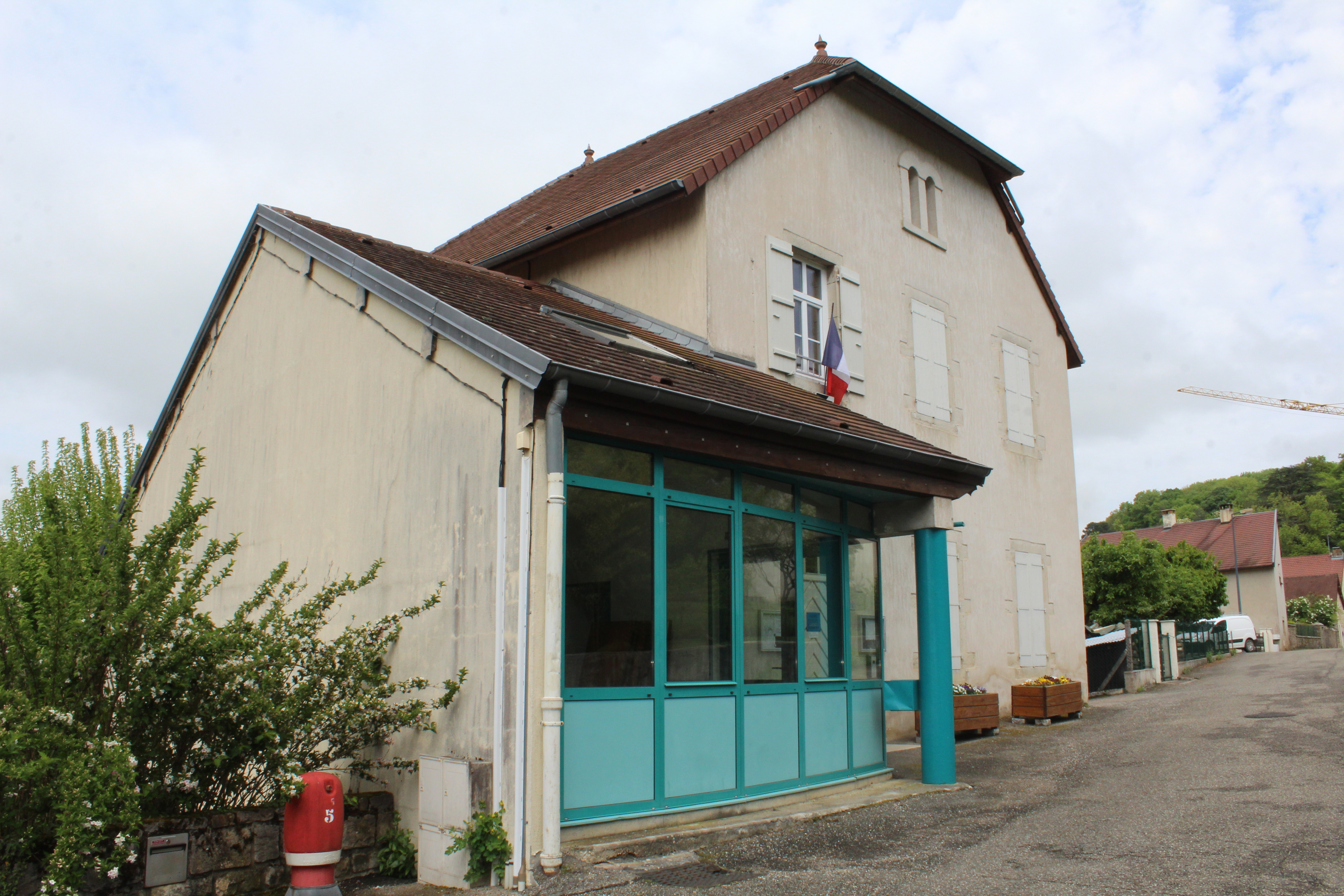
- The town hall in Chille
- Location of Chille
- Location within France Location within Bourgogne-Franche-Comté
- Coordinates: 46°41′41″N 5°34′31″E
- Country: France
- Region: Bourgogne-Franche-Comté
- Department: Jura
- Arrondissement: Lons-le-Saunier
- Canton: Lons-le-Saunier-1
- Intercommunality: Espace Communautaire Lons Agglomération

Government
  - Mayor (2020–2026): Maurice Gallet
- Area^{1}: 1.96 km^{2} (0.76 sq mi)
- Highest elevation: 388 m (1,273 ft)
- Lowest elevation: 262 m (860 ft)
- Population (2023): 295
  - Density: 151/km^{2} (390/sq mi)
- Time zone: UTC+01:00 (CET)
  - Summer (DST): UTC+02:00 (CEST)
- INSEE/Postal code: 39145 /39570
- ^{1} French Land Register data, which excludes lakes, ponds, glaciers > 1 km^{2} (0.386 sq mi or 247 acres) and river estuaries.

Chille (French pronunciation: [ʃij]) is a commune in the Jura department in Bourgogne-Franche-Comté in eastern France.

== Population ==
Historical population
| Year | Pop. | ±% p.a. |
|---|---|---|
| 1968 | 110 | — |
| 1975 | 157 | +5.21% |
| 1982 | 184 | +2.29% |
| 1990 | 217 | +2.08% |
| 1999 | 254 | +1.76% |
| 2007 | 331 | +3.37% |
| 2012 | 298 | −2.08% |
| 2017 | 293 | −0.34% |
| 2023 | 295 | +0.11% |
Source: INSEE

== See also ==
- Communes of the Jura department
