= Parc des Bains =

Park in Jura, France

Coordinates: 46°40′18″N 5°33′50″E

Parc des Bains is a park located in the region of Jura, in the Franche-Comté of eastern France. It was built under Camille Prost and was completed in 1904. In the late 19th century, Camille Prost wanted to create a spa in the city of Lons-le-Saunier, to showcase its salt water. The park, covering 7 hectares, was built to embellish the surrounding area and was designed by the French horticulturist and landscape architect H. Michel.

== Main features ==
The park is consistent and has not been greatly modified since its inception. Floristically, it presents a rare richness and diversity. It consists of a treated landscaped garden bordered by winding paths around the lawn. The park has beautiful old trees. It resembles a typical landscape project of the late 19th century, being rich in species diversity and quality, including redwoods, tulip-trees, lime-trees, honey locusts, Japanese sophoras, and Mexican acacias. The fountains were installed in the early 1960.
