= Jean-Claude Colliard =

French academic and senior public servant

Member of the Constitutional Council
- In office 1998–2007
- President: Jacques Chirac
- Preceded by: Jacques Robert
- Succeeded by: Guy Canivet

Personal details
- Born: 15 March 1946 16th arrondissement of Paris, France
- Died: 27 March 2014 (aged 68) Paris, France
- Education: Lycée Henri-IV
- Alma mater: Sciences Po; University of Paris
- Occupation: Civil servant

Jean-Claude Colliard (15 March 1946 – 27 March 2014) was a French academic and senior public servant.

Colliard was born in Paris. He graduated from the Paris Institute of Political Studies (Sciences Po), and obtained a Ph.D. in law from the University of Paris. He also held an agrégation in public law and political science.

He was a member of the Constitutional Council of France (from 1998 to 2007), and later was the chancellor of Université Panthéon Sorbonne Paris 1, France's top secondary institution. He was Chief of Staff for President François Mitterrand from 1982 to 1988. He was chief of staff to Laurent Fabius, President of the National Assembly from 1988 to 1992.

He was a recognized specialist in comparative government. He was director of the Department of Political Science at University Paris 1 – Panthéon-Sorbonne in 1995. He died on 27 March 2014, aged 68.
