= Jean Baptiste Gaspard Roux de Rochelle =

French diplomat and author

Jean Baptiste Gaspard Roux de Rochelle (26 March 1762 – March 1849) was a French geographer, writer, poet and ambassador to the U.S.

== Ambassador ==
Born in Lons-le-Saunier, Roux de Rochelle was head of division at the Ministry of Foreign Affairs, then was appointed Minister Plenipotentiary of France to Hamburg from 1826 to 1830, then to the United States in Washington, D.C. from 1830 to 1831.

== Geographer ==
He was a member of several learned and literary societies, including the Société de Géographie (of which he was for the third time the president of the Central Commission) and of the Société philotechniqne.

Roux de Rochelle died in Paris at approximatively age of 87.

== Writer ==
He wrote several geographical and historical works.

- Les Trois âges, ou les Jeux olympiques, l'Amphithéâtre et la Chevalerie, poems in VI chants, with notes. Paris, F. Didot, 1816.
- Recueil de voyages et de mémoires including Voyages de Marco Polo, Paris, 1824
- La Byzanciade, poem (epic, in XIV chants). Paris, F. Didot et fils, 1822.
- Lettres des États-Unis, 1835
- Les États-Unis, (Histoire de ces États). Paris, F. Didot fr., 1836.
- Histoire du Régiment de Champagne, F. Didot, Paris, 1839
- Épopée de Fernan Cortes
- Villes Anséatiques, Firmin Didot, Paris, 1844
- Histoire d'Italie, F. Didot, Paris, 1847
