= Jeanne Champion =

French painter and author (1931–2022)

Jeannine Champion
- Born: Jeannine Gabrielle Marie Ange Champion; 25 June 1931; Lons-le-Saunier
- Died: 16 March 2022 (aged 90)
- Occupations: painter, historical novelist

Jeannine Gabrielle Marie Ange Champion (25 June 1931 – 16 March 2022), better known as Jeanne Champion was a French painter and historical novelist.

== Biography ==
Jeanne Champion, born in a peasant environment near Lons-le-Saunier, was largely self-taught. An artist-painter from 1956, she produced many works in her two fields of activity. In painting, often unsatisfied, she destroyed many of her creations but she left some 200 paintings and a good number of engravings.

Champion died on 16 March 2022, at the age of 90.

== Honours ==
A writer from 1961, Champion was awarded the Prix Goncourt de la biographie in 1984 for her fictionalized biography of Suzanne Valadon, translated into several languages.

Champion was also given the Grand Prix du roman de la Société des gens de lettres (1980) for her novel Les frères Montaurian, the Prix de l'Événement du jeudi (1986) for le Bunker and the Prix des écrivains croyants (1990) for her documentary book Mémoires en exil.

In 1982, she was awarded the Prix Alice-Louis Bartoux of the Académie française.

Champion was elevated to the rank of officier of the Ordre des Arts et des Lettres in 2001.

== Literature ==
- 1967: Le Cri, novel, Éditions Julliard.
- 1968: Les Miroirs jumeaux, novel, Julliard.
- 1969: X., novel, Bourgois.
- 1969: Les Enfants des Roumis, éd. d'Halluin et Cie
- 1973: Vautour-en-Privilège, novel, ed. Calmann-Lévy
- 1974: Ma Fille Marie-Hélène Charles Quint, ed. Calmann-Lévy
- 1975: Dans les jardins d'Esther, novel, ed. Calmann-Lévy
- 1977: Les Gisants ed. Calmann-Lévy
- 1979: Les frères Montaurian, novel, Éditions Grasset
- 1981: La Passion selon Martial Montaurian, novel, éd. Grasset
- 1982: L'Amour capital, novel, Calmann-Lévy
- 1984: Suzanne Valadon, fictionalized biography, Presses de la Renaissance
- 1985: Le Bunker, Calmann-Lévy
- 1986: Bette Davis, Lherminier.
- 1987: La Hurlevent, fictionalized biography, Presses de la Renaissance.
- 1989: Memoires en exil, documentary, Fayard.
- 1996: La Maison Germanicus, Grasset.
- 1999: L'Amour à perpétuité, novel, Grasset.
- 2001: Lambeaux de mémoire : Enfance, éd. Plon
- 2002: J'hallucine, éd. Mille et une nuits.
- 2004: Autoportrait d'une charogne: Lambeaux de mémoire II, éd. Plon
- 2005: Le terrible, fictionalized biography of Ivan the Terrible, éd. Fayard
- 2006: Le Fils du silence, éd. Fayard.
- 2007: Ils ne savent plus dire "Je t'aime", éd. Fayard
- 2008: L'ombre de Judas, éd. Fayard
- 2009: Là où tu n'es plus, novel, éd. Fayard
- 2011: Le prince de la mélancolie, novel Charles d'Orléans, éd. Pierre-Guillaume de Roux Éditions

== Painting ==
- 2002: Idoles, suivi de Avant-dernière toiles (with Yann Queffélec), Cercle d'Art.

=== Selected Artworks ===
- 1959: Le Beau Militaire, oil on canvas
- 1969: Paysage, oil on canvas
- 1970: Portrait d'Apollinaire, mixed media on paper
- 1977: Le Museo Imaginaire, pastel on paper
- 1984: Durer au Pays, pastel on paper
- 1988: The Dream of a Virgin, painting
- 2002: Idoles, suivi de Avant-dernière toiles (with Yann Queffélec), Cercle d'Art.

=== Selected Solo & Group Exhibitions ===
- 1963: Galerie Suzanne de Coninck, Paris
- 1964: Musée des Arts décoratifs de Saint-Étienne
- 1966 & 1978: Galerie Karl Flinker, Paris
- 1967: Salon de Mai, Grand Palais, Paris
- 1974: UNESCO, Paris
- 1976: Salon des Femmes Peintres, Paris
- 1981: Dessins d'Écrivains, Centre Pompidou (Beaubourg), Paris
- 2011: L'avant-dernière, La Bellevilloise, Paris

== Bibliography ==
- Alain Bosquet, Les envoûtements de Jeanne Champion
- Sarah Charlotte Rouncefield, Theme and Form in the Works of Jeanne Champion, University of Exeter, 1994
