= Canton of Lons-le-Saunier-1 =

Coordinates: 46.68°N 5.55°E

The canton of Lons-le-Saunier-1 is an administrative division of the Jura department, eastern France. It was created at the French canton reorganisation which came into effect in March 2015. Its seat is in Lons-le-Saunier.

It consists of the following communes:

1. Chille
2. Condamine
3. Courlans
4. Courlaoux
5. L'Étoile
6. Lons-le-Saunier (partly)
7. Montmorot
8. Saint-Didier
9. Villeneuve-sous-Pymont
