= Courlans =

Commune in Bourgogne-Franche-Comté, France

- Commune
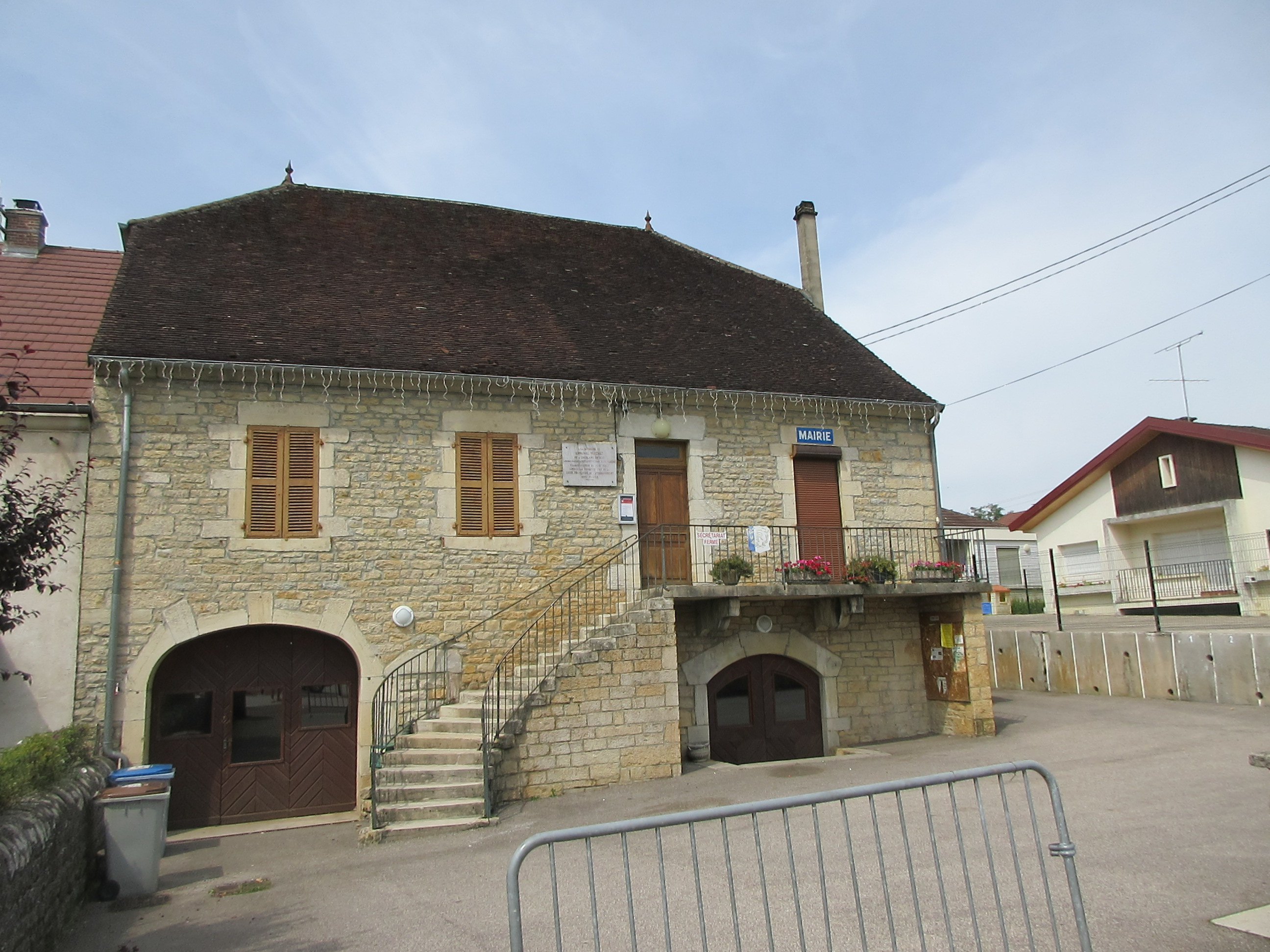
- The town hall in Courlans

- Coat of arms
- Location of Courlans
- Location within France Location within Bourgogne-Franche-Comté
- Coordinates: 46°40′33″N 5°29′50″E
- Country: France
- Region: Bourgogne-Franche-Comté
- Department: Jura
- Arrondissement: Lons-le-Saunier
- Canton: Lons-le-Saunier-1
- Intercommunality: Espace Communautaire Lons Agglomération

Government
  - Mayor (2020–2026): Alain Pattingre
- Area^{1}: 6.16 km^{2} (2.38 sq mi)
- Highest elevation: 280 m (920 ft)
- Lowest elevation: 211 m (692 ft)
- Population (2023): 938
  - Density: 152/km^{2} (394/sq mi)
- Time zone: UTC+01:00 (CET)
  - Summer (DST): UTC+02:00 (CEST)
- INSEE/Postal code: 39170 /39570
- ^{1} French Land Register data, which excludes lakes, ponds, glaciers > 1 km^{2} (0.386 sq mi or 247 acres) and river estuaries.

Courlans (French pronunciation: [kuʁlɑ̃]) is a commune in the Jura department in Bourgogne-Franche-Comté in eastern France.

== Geography ==
The Vallière flows southwest through the commune's southern part and forms part of its southwestern border.

== Population ==
Historical population
Year	Pop.	±% p.a.
1968	412	—
1975	446	+1.14%
1982	646	+5.44%
1990	640	−0.12%
1999	737	+1.58%
2007	956	+3.31%
2012	968	+0.25%
2017	926	−0.88%
2023	938	+0.21%
Source: INSEE

== See also ==
- Communes of the Jura department
