= L'Étoile, Jura =

Commune in Bourgogne-Franche-Comté, France

L'Étoile
- Commune
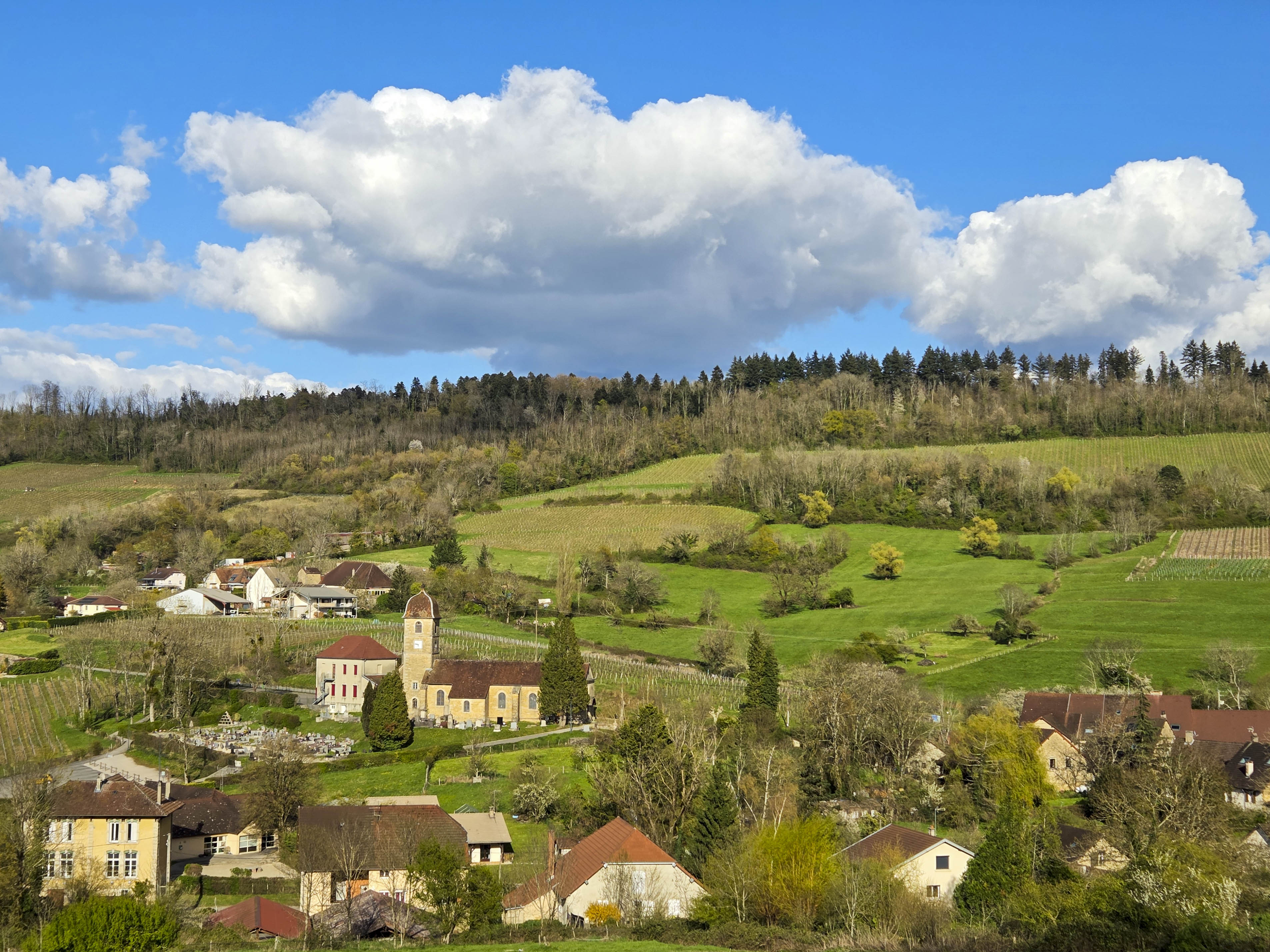
- View of the village of L'Étoile

- Coat of arms
- Location of L'Étoile
- Location within France Location within Bourgogne-Franche-Comté
- Coordinates: 46°42′54″N 5°32′10″E
- Country: France
- Region: Bourgogne-Franche-Comté
- Department: Jura
- Arrondissement: Lons-le-Saunier
- Canton: Lons-le-Saunier-1
- Intercommunality: Espace Communautaire Lons Agglomération

Government
  - Mayor (2020–2026): Thierry Bailly
- Area^{1}: 6.13 km^{2} (2.37 sq mi)
- Highest elevation: 424 m (1,391 ft)
- Lowest elevation: 235 m (771 ft)
- Population (2023): 567
  - Density: 92.5/km^{2} (240/sq mi)
- Time zone: UTC+01:00 (CET)
  - Summer (DST): UTC+02:00 (CEST)
- INSEE/Postal code: 39217 /39570
- ^{1} French Land Register data, which excludes lakes, ponds, glaciers > 1 km^{2} (0.386 sq mi or 247 acres) and river estuaries.

L'Étoile (French pronunciation: [letwal]) is a commune in the Jura department in Bourgogne-Franche-Comté in eastern France.

== Population ==
Historical population
Year	Pop.	±% p.a.
1968	347	—
1975	419	+2.73%
1982	469	+1.62%
1990	512	+1.10%
1999	581	+1.41%
2007	553	−0.62%
2012	566	+0.47%
2017	563	−0.11%
2023	567	+0.12%
Source: INSEE

== See also ==
- Communes of the Jura department
