= Saint-Didier, Jura =

Commune in Bourgogne-Franche-Comté, France

Saint-Didier
- Commune
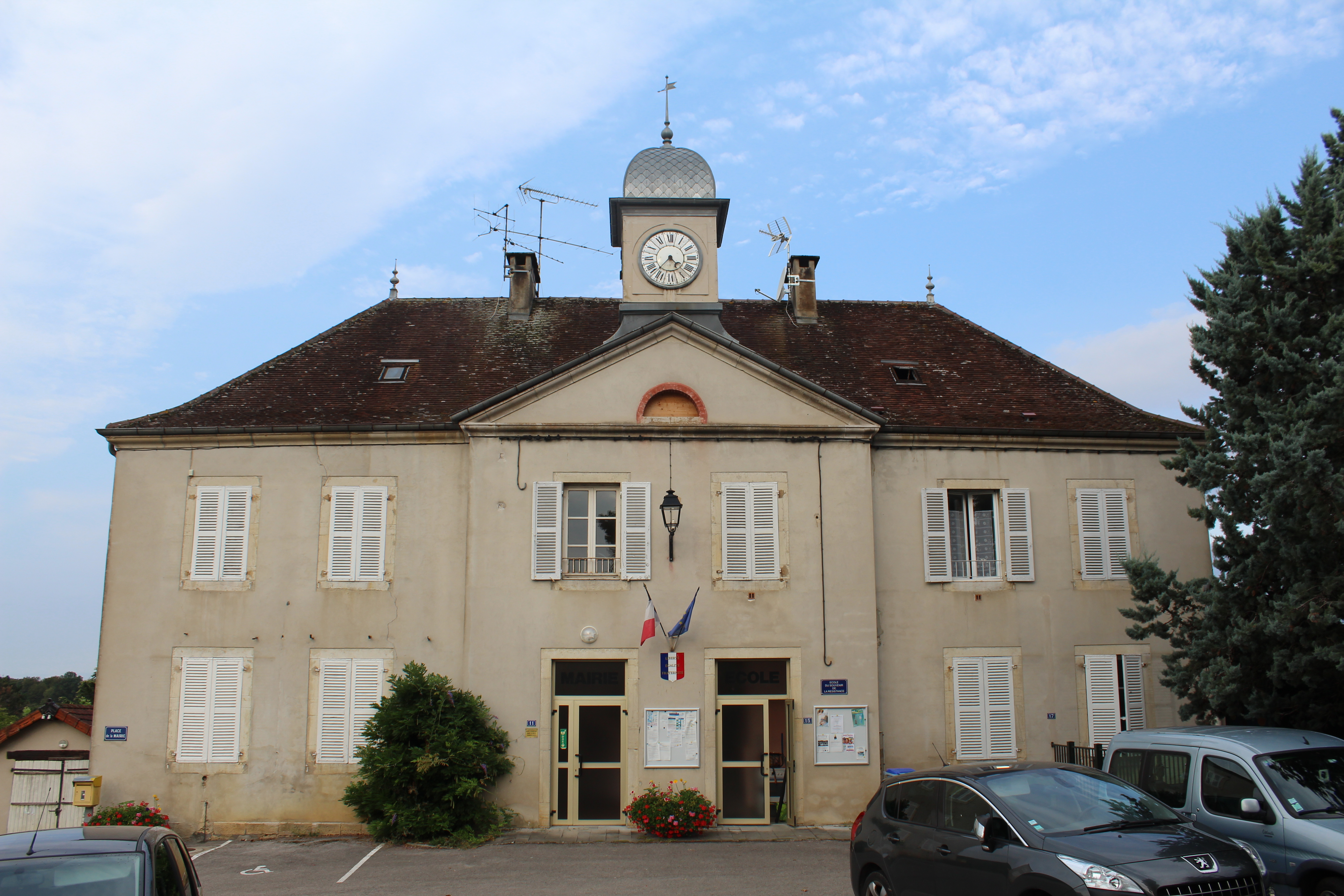
- The town hall in Saint-Didier
- Location of Saint-Didier
- Location within France Location within Bourgogne-Franche-Comté
- Coordinates: 46°42′34″N 5°30′38″E
- Country: France
- Region: Bourgogne-Franche-Comté
- Department: Jura
- Arrondissement: Lons-le-Saunier
- Canton: Lons-le-Saunier-1
- Intercommunality: Espace Communautaire Lons Agglomération

Government
  - Mayor (2020–2026): Michel Junier
- Area^{1}: 3.02 km^{2} (1.17 sq mi)
- Highest elevation: 333 m (1,093 ft)
- Lowest elevation: 210 m (690 ft)
- Population (2023): 277
  - Density: 91.7/km^{2} (238/sq mi)
- Time zone: UTC+01:00 (CET)
  - Summer (DST): UTC+02:00 (CEST)
- INSEE/Postal code: 39480 /39570
- ^{1} French Land Register data, which excludes lakes, ponds, glaciers > 1 km^{2} (0.386 sq mi or 247 acres) and river estuaries.

Saint-Didier (French pronunciation: [sɛ̃ didje]) is a commune in the Jura department in the Bourgogne-Franche-Comté region in eastern France.

== Population ==
Historical population
Year	Pop.	±% p.a.
1968	116	—
1975	136	+2.30%
1982	204	+5.96%
1990	204	+0.00%
1999	267	+3.04%
2007	306	+1.72%
2012	298	−0.53%
2017	269	−2.03%
2023	277	+0.49%
Source: INSEE

== See also ==
- L'Étoile AOC
- Communes of the Jura department
