= Condamine, Jura =

Commune in Bourgogne-Franche-Comté, France

Condamine
- Commune
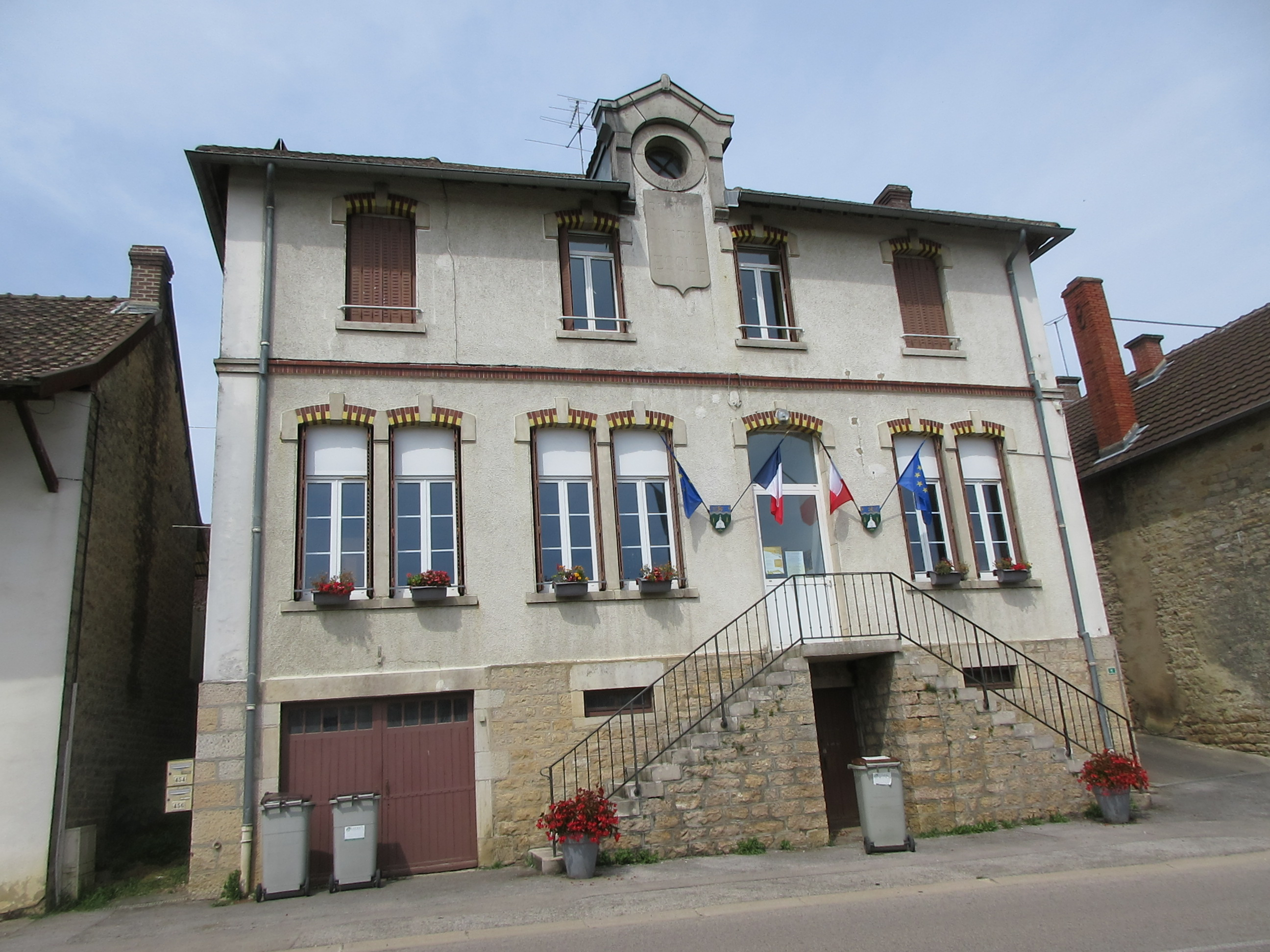
- The town hall in Condamine
- Location of Condamine
- Location within France Location within Bourgogne-Franche-Comté
- Coordinates: 46°39′04″N 5°26′26″E
- Country: France
- Region: Bourgogne-Franche-Comté
- Department: Jura
- Arrondissement: Lons-le-Saunier
- Canton: Lons-le-Saunier-1
- Intercommunality: Espace Communautaire Lons Agglomération

Government
  - Mayor (2020–2026): Hervé Guy
- Area^{1}: 3.65 km^{2} (1.41 sq mi)
- Highest elevation: 224 m (735 ft)
- Lowest elevation: 197 m (646 ft)
- Population (2023): 243
  - Density: 66.6/km^{2} (172/sq mi)
- Time zone: UTC+01:00 (CET)
  - Summer (DST): UTC+02:00 (CEST)
- INSEE/Postal code: 39162 /39570
- ^{1} French Land Register data, which excludes lakes, ponds, glaciers > 1 km^{2} (0.386 sq mi or 247 acres) and river estuaries.

Condamine (French pronunciation: [kɔ̃damin]) is a commune in the Jura department in Bourgogne-Franche-Comté in eastern France.

== Geography ==
The Vallière flows southwest through the commune's eastern part.

== Population ==
Historical population
Year	Pop.	±% p.a.
1968	146	—
1975	149	+0.29%
1982	155	+0.57%
1990	178	+1.74%
1999	212	+1.96%
2007	224	+0.69%
2012	274	+4.11%
2017	272	−0.15%
2023	243	−1.86%
Source: INSEE

== See also ==
- Communes of the Jura department
