= Guy Canivet =

French judge

Member of the Constitutional Council
- In office 5 March 2007 – 4 March 2016
- Appointed by: Jean-Louis Debré
- President: Jean-Louis Debré
- Preceded by: Jean-Claude Colliard
- Succeeded by: Corinne Luquiens

First President of the Court of cassation
- In office 2 July 1999 – 5 March 2007
- Preceded by: Pierre Truche
- Succeeded by: Vincent Lamanda

Personal details
- Born: 23 September 1943 (age 82) Lons-le-Saunier, France
- Education: École Nationale de la Magistrature
- Occupation: Magistrate
- Awards: List: Officer of the Ordre national du Mérite (1998); Docteur honoris causa of Laval University (2004); Commander of the Ordre des Arts et des Lettres (2007); Great Officer of the Legion of Honor (2016); Commander of the Ordre des Palmes académiques

Guy Canivet (born 23 September 1943 in Lons-le-Saunier) is a French judge.

As of 2005, he is president of the Court of Cassation and as such is the highest judge in France.

On 22 February 2007, Jean-Louis Debré, president of the French National Assembly, appointed Guy Canivet to the Constitutional Council of France, replacing Jean-Claude Colliard.
