= Vallière (river) =

River in eastern France

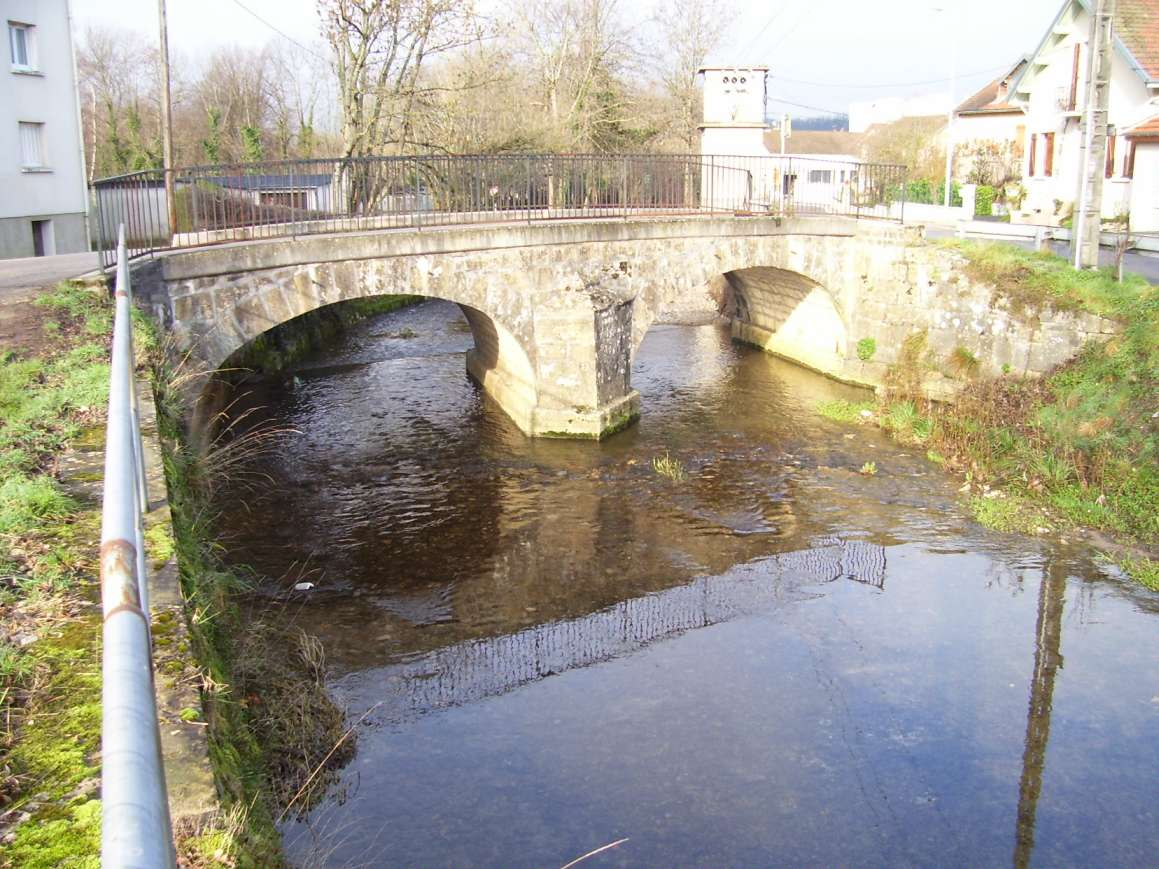

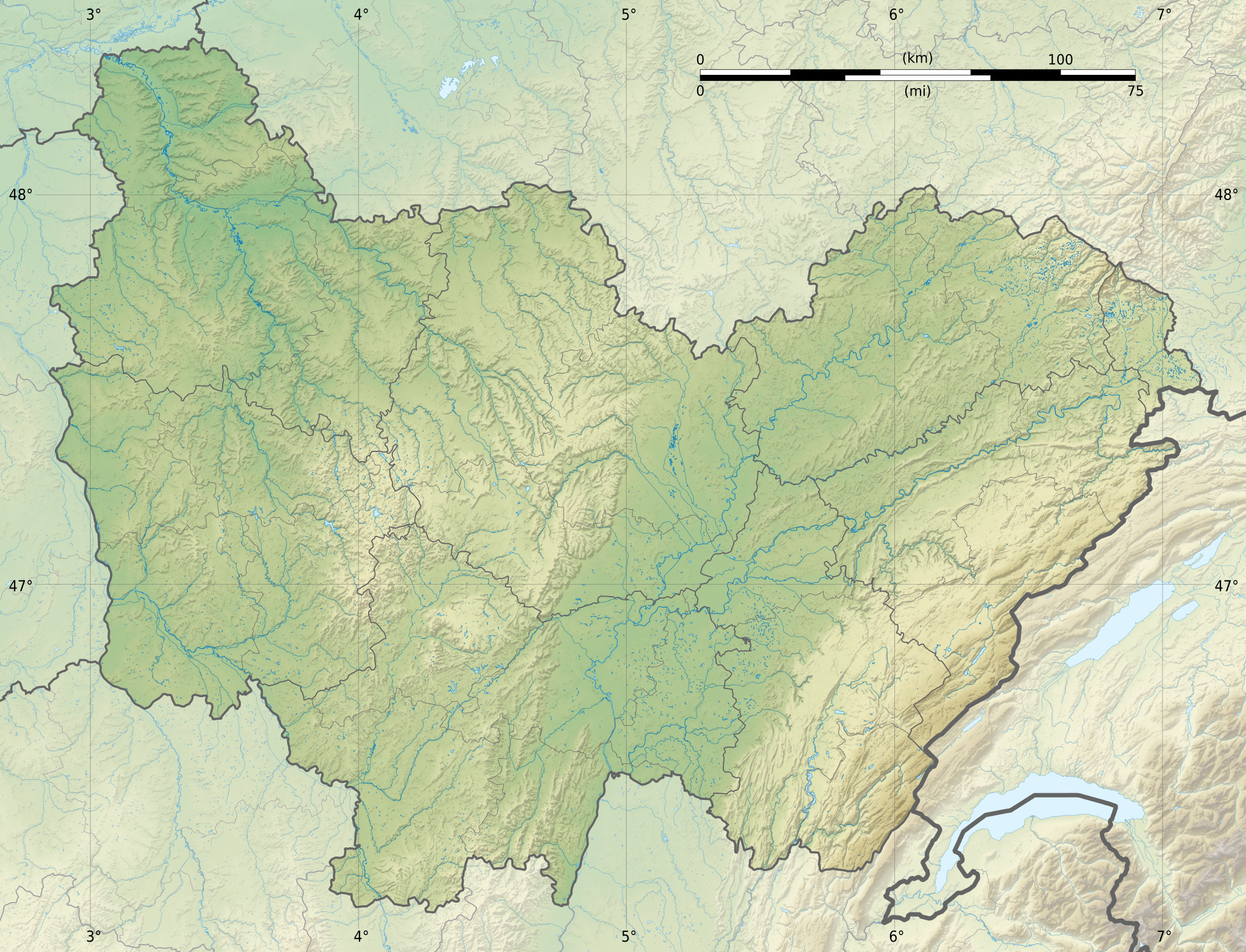
- Location within France Location within Bourgogne-Franche-Comté

Location
- Country: France

Physical characteristics
- Source
  - location: Revigny
  - coordinates: 46°37′25″N 05°36′28″E
  - elevation: 400 m (1,300 ft)
- Mouth
  - location: Solnan
  - coordinates: 46°37′09″N 05°13′22″E
  - elevation: 177 m (581 ft)
- Length: 50.9 km (31.6 mi)
- Basin size: 250 km^{2} (97 sq mi)
- Discharge
  - average: 5 m^{3}/s (180 cu ft/s)

Basin features
- Progression: Solnan→ Seille→ Saône→ Rhône→ Mediterranean Sea

The Vallière (French pronunciation: [valjɛʁ]) is a 50.9-kilometre (31.6 mi) long river in the Jura and Saône-et-Loire departments in eastern France. Its source is in the steephead valley of Revigny, in the Jura Mountains. It flows generally west. It is a right tributary of the Solnan, into which it flows between Bruailles and Louhans.

== Departments and communes along its course ==
This list is ordered from source to mouth:

- Jura: Revigny, Conliège, Montaigu, Perrigny, Lons-le-Saunier, Montmorot, Courlans, Courlaoux, Condamine,
- Saône-et-Loire: Savigny-en-Revermont, Flacey-en-Bresse, Sagy, Saint-Martin-du-Mont, Bruailles, Louhans,
