= Courlaoux =

Commune in Bourgogne-Franche-Comté, France

- Commune
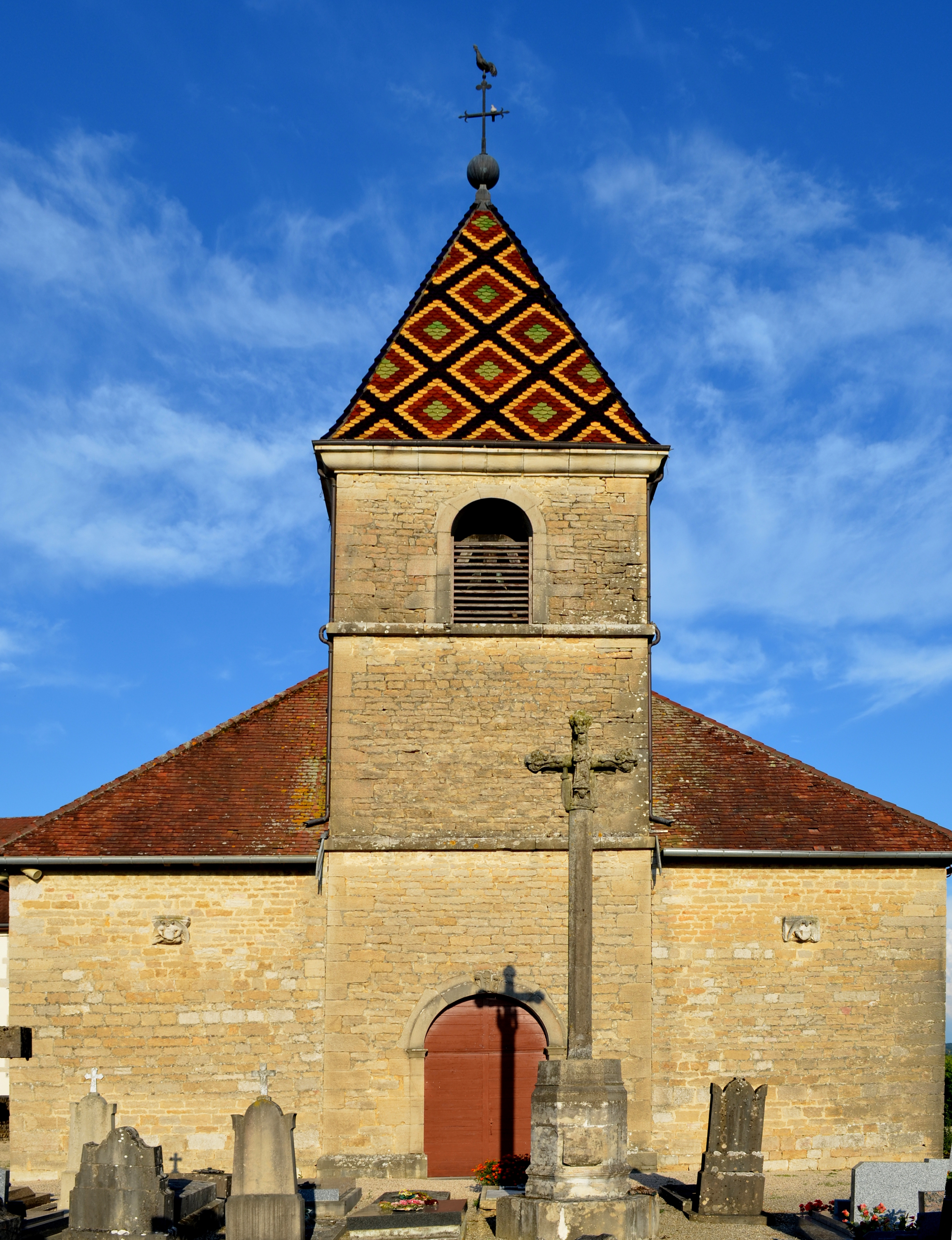
- The church in Courlaoux
- Location of Courlaoux
- Location within France Location within Bourgogne-Franche-Comté
- Coordinates: 46°40′06″N 5°27′45″E
- Country: France
- Region: Bourgogne-Franche-Comté
- Department: Jura
- Arrondissement: Lons-le-Saunier
- Canton: Lons-le-Saunier-1
- Intercommunality: Espace Communautaire Lons Agglomération

Government
  - Mayor (2020–2026): Jean-Yves Lanneau
- Area^{1}: 12.42 km^{2} (4.80 sq mi)
- Highest elevation: 230 m (750 ft)
- Lowest elevation: 201 m (659 ft)
- Population (2023): 1,204
  - Density: 96.94/km^{2} (251.1/sq mi)
- Time zone: UTC+01:00 (CET)
  - Summer (DST): UTC+02:00 (CEST)
- INSEE/Postal code: 39171 /39570
- ^{1} French Land Register data, which excludes lakes, ponds, glaciers > 1 km^{2} (0.386 sq mi or 247 acres) and river estuaries.

Courlaoux (French pronunciation: [kuʁlau]) is a commune in the Jura department in Bourgogne-Franche-Comté in eastern France.

== Geography ==
The Vallière flows southwest through the commune's southern part.

== Population ==
Historical population
Year	Pop.	±% p.a.
1968	468	—
1975	544	+2.17%
1982	676	+3.15%
1990	804	+2.19%
1999	848	+0.59%
2007	927	+1.12%
2012	997	+1.47%
2017	1,106	+2.10%
2023	1,204	+1.43%
Source: INSEE

== See also ==
- Communes of the Jura department
