= Conliège =

Commune in Bourgogne-Franche-Comté, France

- Commune
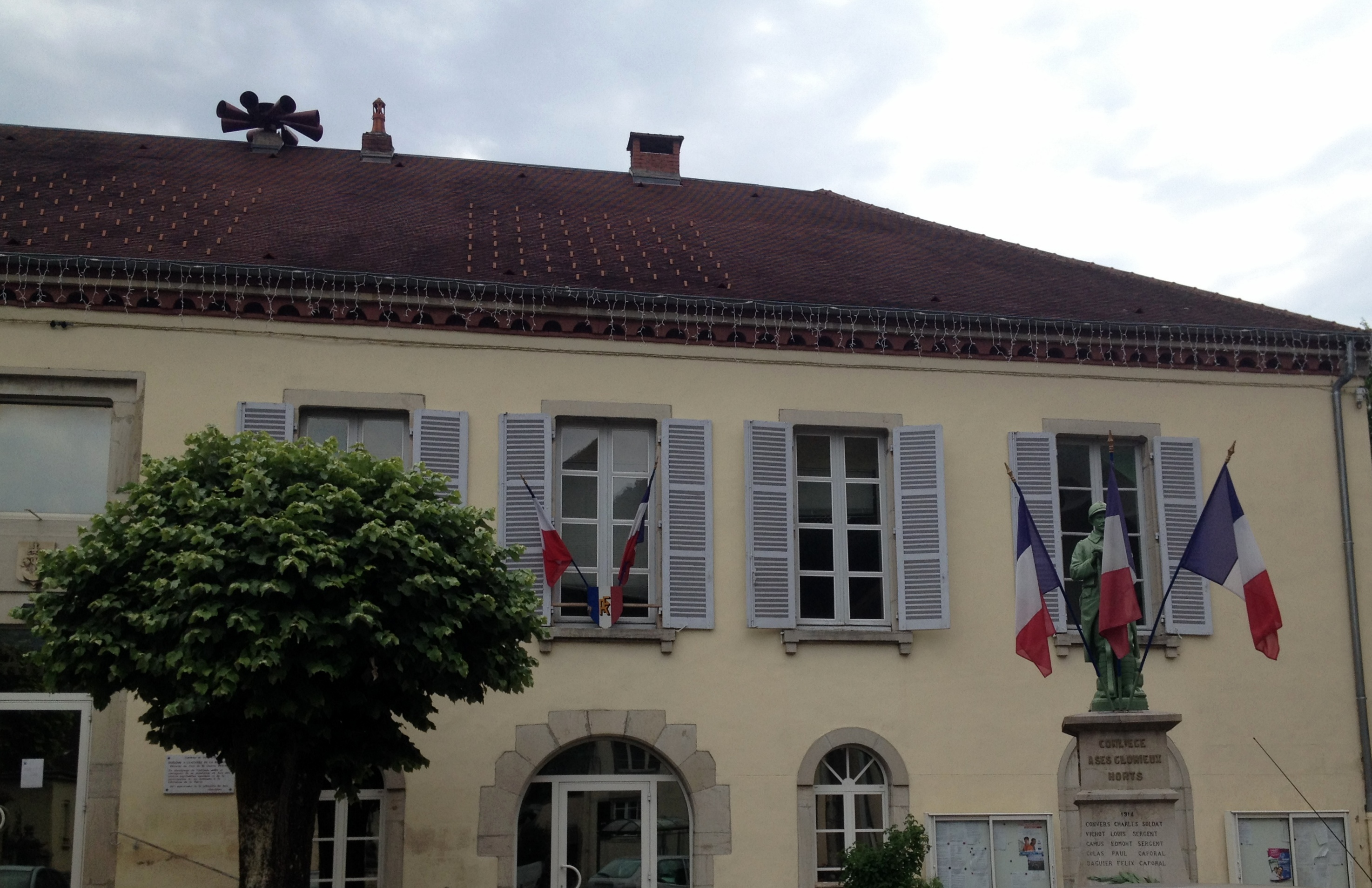
- Town hall

- Coat of arms
- Location of Conliège
- Location within France Location within Bourgogne-Franche-Comté
- Coordinates: 46°39′20″N 5°36′01″E
- Country: France
- Region: Bourgogne-Franche-Comté
- Department: Jura
- Arrondissement: Lons-le-Saunier
- Canton: Poligny
- Intercommunality: Espace Communautaire Lons Agglomération

Government
  - Mayor (2020–2026): Jérôme Cordellier
- Area^{1}: 6.05 km^{2} (2.34 sq mi)
- Highest elevation: 550 m (1,800 ft)
- Lowest elevation: 302 m (991 ft)
- Population (2023): 667
  - Density: 110/km^{2} (286/sq mi)
- Time zone: UTC+01:00 (CET)
  - Summer (DST): UTC+02:00 (CEST)
- INSEE/Postal code: 39164 /39570
- ^{1} French Land Register data, which excludes lakes, ponds, glaciers > 1 km^{2} (0.386 sq mi or 247 acres) and river estuaries.

Conliège (French pronunciation: [kɔ̃ljɛʒ]; Arpitan: Conliidzou) is a commune in the Jura department in Bourgogne-Franche-Comté in eastern France.

== Geography ==
The Vallière flows north through the commune, in the steephead valley where lies the village.

== Population ==
Historical population
Year	Pop.	±% p.a.
1968	938	—
1975	847	−1.45%
1982	779	−1.19%
1990	752	−0.44%
1999	731	−0.31%
2007	713	−0.31%
2012	692	−0.60%
2017	668	−0.70%
2023	667	−0.02%
Source: INSEE

== See also ==
- Communes of the Jura department
