= Lons-le-Saunier =

Prefecture and commune in Bourgogne-Franche-Comté, France

Lons-le-Saunier Lon-Tsânier (Arpitan)
- Prefecture and commune
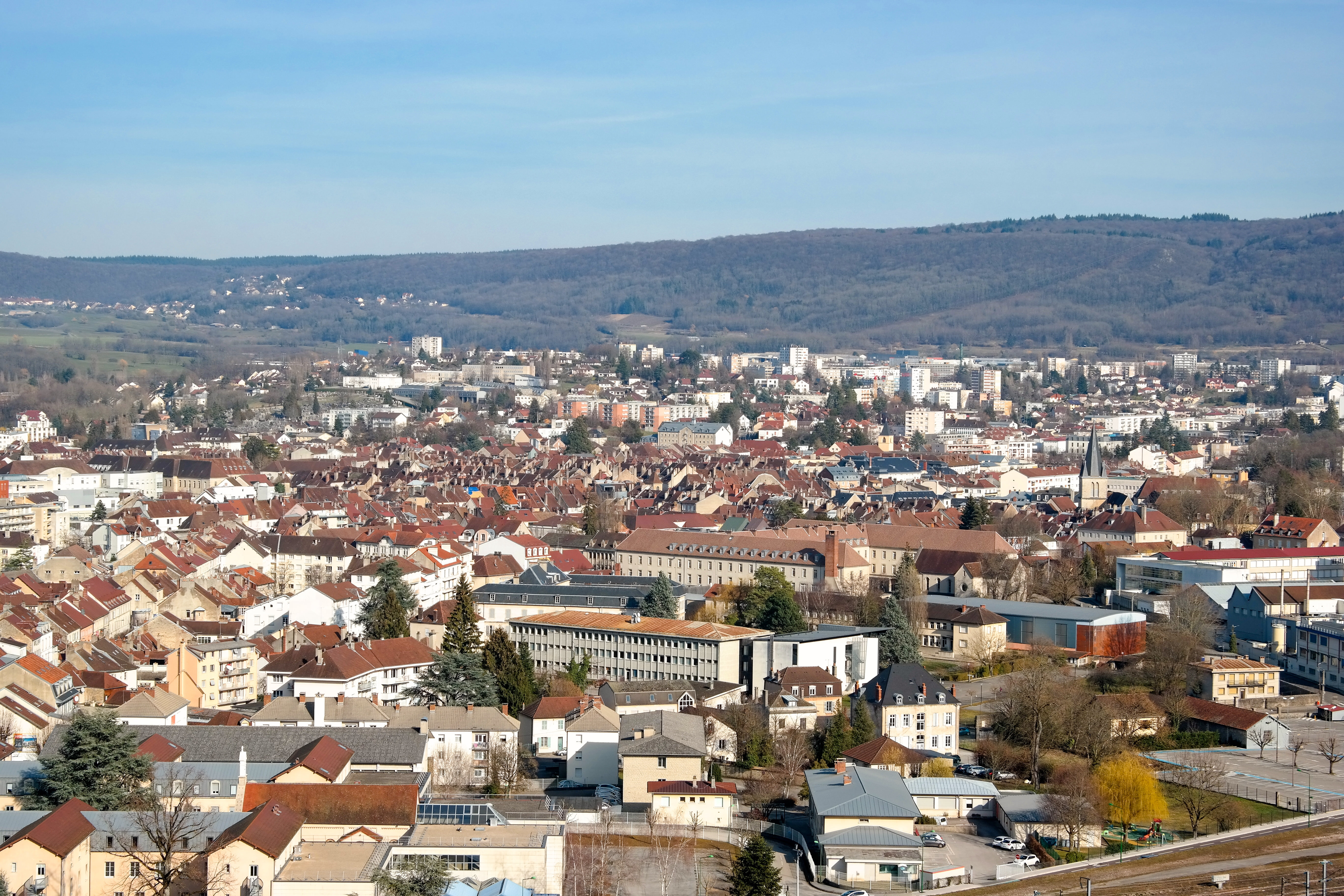
- General view of Lons-le-Saunier

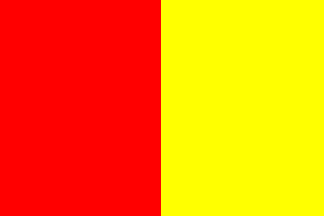
- Flag Coat of arms
- Location of Lons-le-Saunier
- Location within France Location within Bourgogne-Franche-Comté
- Coordinates: 46°40′28″N 5°33′14″E
- Country: France
- Region: Bourgogne-Franche-Comté
- Department: Jura
- Arrondissement: Lons-le-Saunier
- Canton: Lons-le-Saunier-1 and 2
- Intercommunality: Espace Communautaire Lons Agglomération

Government
  - Mayor (2020–2026): Jean-Yves Ravier
- Area^{1}: 7.68 km^{2} (2.97 sq mi)
- Elevation: 255 m (837 ft)
- Highest elevation: 415 m (1,362 ft)
- Lowest elevation: 243 m (797 ft)
- Population (2023): 16,618
  - Density: 2,160/km^{2} (5,600/sq mi)
- Time zone: UTC+01:00 (CET)
  - Summer (DST): UTC+02:00 (CEST)
- INSEE/Postal code: 39300 /39000
- Website: www.lonslesaunier.fr
- ^{1} French Land Register data, which excludes lakes, ponds, glaciers > 1 km^{2} (0.386 sq mi or 247 acres) and river estuaries.

Lons-le-Saunier (French pronunciation: [lɔ̃s lə sonje]; Arpitan: Lon-Tsânier) is a commune in and the prefecture of the eastern French department of Jura.

== Geography ==
The town is in the heart of the Revermont region, at the foot of the first plateau of the Jura massif. The Jura escarpment extends to the east and south, while to the west lies the plain of Bresse and to the north extensive vineyards.

The river Vallière runs through the town, rising in a typical Jura blind valley not far away, at Revigny. It has been conduited since the 1960s on grounds of hygiene, since sewage outlets run into it. A small section remains in the open air near the parc des Bains, and only a single bridge (the pont de la Guiche) remains.

The town is approximately equally placed between Besançon, Dijon, Bourg-en-Bresse and Geneva, though the last of these lies on the other side of the Jura massif. It is served by the A39 autoroute, by which Dijon can be reached in about an hour and Lyon in an hour and a half. The town's railway station lies on the line from Strasbourg to Lyon.

The wine-growing region to the north of the town is particularly well known, and includes the vintages of l'Etoile, Château-Chalon and Arbois.

The Jura escarpment to the south and east is a popular tourist region, with its attractions including the lakes of Chalain, Clairvaux and Vouglans (at Lect, Jura), and mountain resorts such as Prénovel and Les Rousses.

In terms of area, Lons-le-Saunier is the second smallest prefectural town in France, after Bobigny.

== History ==
The brine springs of Lons-le-Saunier have been exploited since the Neolithic. In the 19th century thermal baths were established, of which the monumental Thermes Lédonia have been preserved. In the 19th century there were copper and iron foundries, and a trade in horses, cattle, grain, cheese, etc.

== Population ==
Historical population

Year	Pop.	±% p.a.
1793	6,740	—
1800	6,041	−1.55%
1806	7,314	+3.24%
1821	7,796	+0.43%
1831	7,918	+0.16%
1836	7,684	−0.60%
1841	8,565	+2.19%
1846	8,781	+0.50%
1851	9,410	+1.39%
1856	9,456	+0.10%
1861	9,862	+0.84%
1866	9,943	+0.16%
1872	10,701	+1.23%
1876	11,391	+1.57%
1881	12,373	+1.67%
1886	12,290	−0.13%
1891	12,610	+0.52%
1896	12,116	−0.80%
1901	12,935	+1.32%

Year	Pop.	±% p.a.
1906	13,133	+0.30%
1911	13,927	+1.18%
1921	13,152	−0.57%
1926	12,651	−0.77%
1931	14,101	+2.19%
1936	14,661	+0.78%
1946	15,568	+0.60%
1954	15,030	−0.44%
1962	15,924	+0.72%
1968	18,769	+2.78%
1975	20,942	+1.58%
1982	20,105	−0.58%
1990	19,144	−0.61%
1999	18,483	−0.39%
2007	18,075	−0.28%
2012	17,353	−0.81%
2017	17,291	−0.07%
2023	16,618	−0.66%

Source: EHESS and INSEE (1968–2023)

== Personalities ==
=== Births ===
- Claude Joseph Rouget de Lisle (1760–1836), composer of La Marseillaise, the French national anthem
- Jean Baptiste Gaspard Roux de Rochelle (1762–1849), ambassador to the U.S.
- Étienne Bobillier (1798–1840), mathematician
- Maurice Joly (1829–78), satirist and lawyer
- René Rémond (born 1918), historian and political economist
- Jeanne Champion (born 1931), French painter and writer
- Guy Canivet (born 1943), judge
- Jean-Claude Romand (born 1954), medical imposter
- Jean-François Stévenin (1944–2021), actor and filmmaker
- Bernard Clavel (1923–2010), novelist
- Félix Lambey (born 1994), rugby player

=== Residents ===
- General Claude Lecourbe (1759–1815) studied in Lons; a statue of him stands in the central Place de la Liberté

== Twin towns ==
Lons-le-Saunier is twinned with:

- Offenburg, Germany
- Ripley, United Kingdom

== Climate ==
Climate data for Lons-le-Saunier (1991–2020 normals, extremes 1974–present)
Month	Jan	Feb	Mar	Apr	May	Jun	Jul	Aug	Sep	Oct	Nov	Dec	Year
Record high °C (°F)	17.2 (63.0)	20.8 (69.4)	23.8 (74.8)	28.3 (82.9)	32.4 (90.3)	36.6 (97.9)	39.4 (102.9)	39.8 (103.6)	33.7 (92.7)	29.0 (84.2)	22.4 (72.3)	19.9 (67.8)	39.8 (103.6)
Mean daily maximum °C (°F)	6.0 (42.8)	7.6 (45.7)	12.4 (54.3)	16.1 (61.0)	20.0 (68.0)	23.8 (74.8)	25.9 (78.6)	25.8 (78.4)	21.3 (70.3)	16.2 (61.2)	10.1 (50.2)	6.6 (43.9)	16.0 (60.8)
Daily mean °C (°F)	3.3 (37.9)	4.2 (39.6)	8.1 (46.6)	11.3 (52.3)	15.1 (59.2)	18.7 (65.7)	20.7 (69.3)	20.5 (68.9)	16.5 (61.7)	12.5 (54.5)	7.1 (44.8)	3.9 (39.0)	11.8 (53.2)
Mean daily minimum °C (°F)	0.6 (33.1)	0.8 (33.4)	3.8 (38.8)	6.4 (43.5)	10.1 (50.2)	13.6 (56.5)	15.5 (59.9)	15.3 (59.5)	11.8 (53.2)	8.8 (47.8)	4.1 (39.4)	1.3 (34.3)	7.7 (45.9)
Record low °C (°F)	−19.6 (−3.3)	−15.8 (3.6)	−12.2 (10.0)	−3.8 (25.2)	−0.2 (31.6)	1.7 (35.1)	6.6 (43.9)	4.8 (40.6)	0.4 (32.7)	−4.2 (24.4)	−9.2 (15.4)	−15.0 (5.0)	−19.6 (−3.3)
Average precipitation mm (inches)	83.0 (3.27)	76.6 (3.02)	79.7 (3.14)	91.5 (3.60)	113.0 (4.45)	88.8 (3.50)	95.4 (3.76)	95.3 (3.75)	95.0 (3.74)	112.4 (4.43)	117.2 (4.61)	99.5 (3.92)	1,147.4 (45.17)
Average precipitation days (≥ 1.0 mm)	12.2	11.1	10.9	10.8	12.6	9.7	9.5	9.8	9.1	12.0	12.2	13.5	133.4
Source: Meteociel
