= Montaigu, Jura =

Commune in Bourgogne-Franche-Comté, France

Montaigu
- Commune
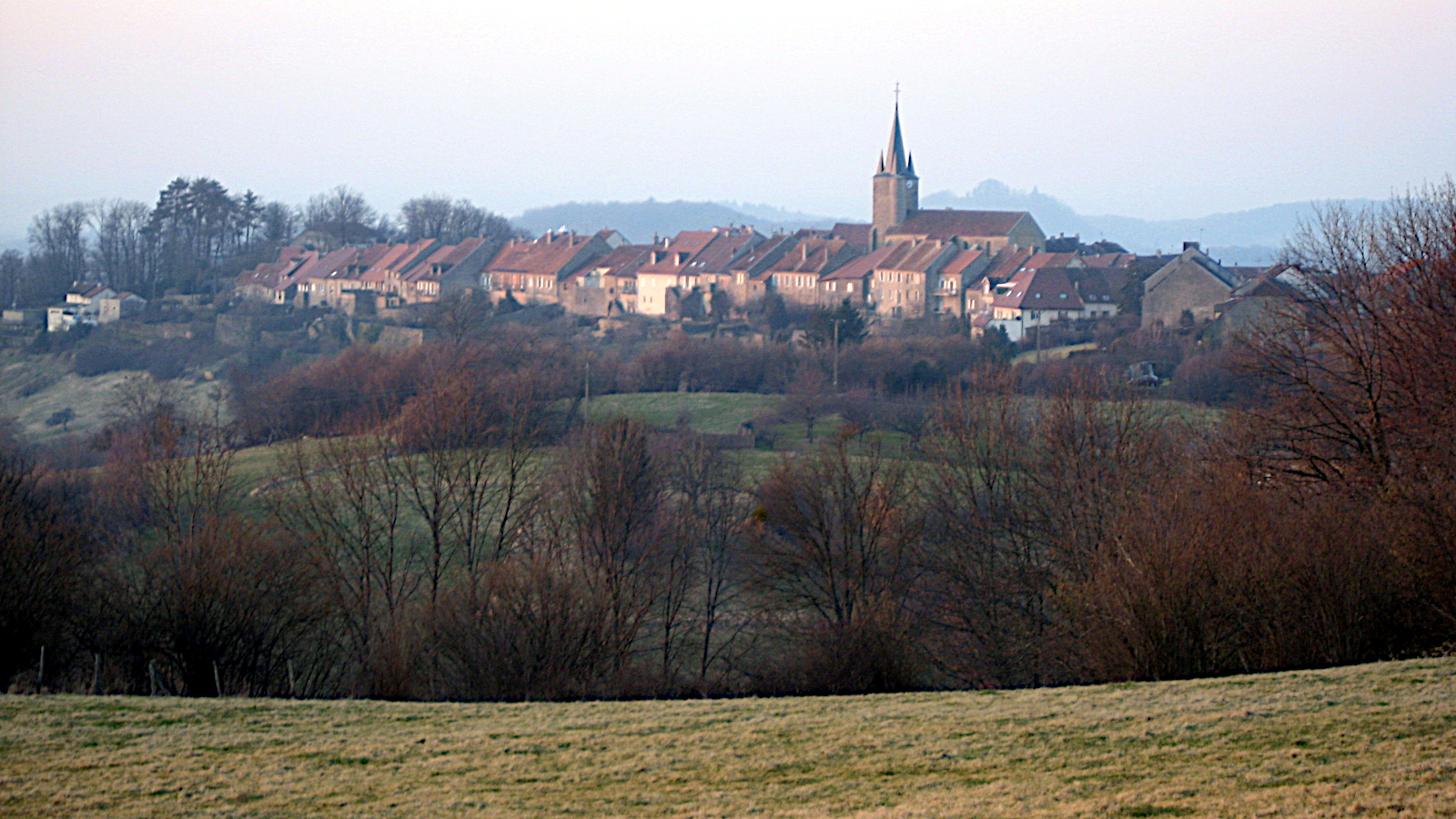
- A general view of Montaigu

- Coat of arms
- Location of Montaigu
- Location within France Location within Bourgogne-Franche-Comté
- Coordinates: 46°39′37″N 5°34′10″E
- Country: France
- Region: Bourgogne-Franche-Comté
- Department: Jura
- Arrondissement: Lons-le-Saunier
- Canton: Poligny
- Intercommunality: Espace Communautaire Lons Agglomération

Government
  - Mayor (2020–2026): Patrick Neilz
- Area^{1}: 7.10 km^{2} (2.74 sq mi)
- Highest elevation: 544 m (1,785 ft)
- Lowest elevation: 270 m (890 ft)
- Population (2023): 427
  - Density: 60.1/km^{2} (156/sq mi)
- Time zone: UTC+01:00 (CET)
  - Summer (DST): UTC+02:00 (CEST)
- INSEE/Postal code: 39348 /39570
- ^{1} French Land Register data, which excludes lakes, ponds, glaciers > 1 km^{2} (0.386 sq mi or 247 acres) and river estuaries.

Montaigu (French pronunciation: [mɔ̃tɛgy]) is a commune in the Jura department in Bourgogne-Franche-Comté in eastern France.

== Geography ==
The Vallière forms the commune's north-eastern border.

== See also ==
- Communes of the Jura department
