= Revigny =

Commune in Bourgogne-Franche-Comté, France

- Commune
- Coat of arms
- Location of Revigny
- Location within France Location within Bourgogne-Franche-Comté
- Coordinates: 46°38′11″N 5°36′21″E
- Country: France
- Region: Bourgogne-Franche-Comté
- Department: Jura
- Arrondissement: Lons-le-Saunier
- Canton: Poligny
- Intercommunality: Espace Communautaire Lons Agglomération

Government
  - Mayor (2020–2026): Jean-Yves Bailly
- Area^{1}: 6.51 km^{2} (2.51 sq mi)
- Highest elevation: 574 m (1,883 ft)
- Lowest elevation: 335 m (1,099 ft)
- Population (2023): 234
  - Density: 35.9/km^{2} (93.1/sq mi)
- Time zone: UTC+01:00 (CET)
  - Summer (DST): UTC+02:00 (CEST)
- INSEE/Postal code: 39458 /39570
- ^{1} French Land Register data, which excludes lakes, ponds, glaciers > 1 km^{2} (0.386 sq mi or 247 acres) and river estuaries.

Revigny (French pronunciation: [ʁəviɲi]) is a commune in the Jura department in the administrative region of Bourgogne-Franche-Comté in eastern France.

== Geography ==
The Vallière has its source in the southern part of the commune; it flows north through the commune in the steephead valley.

== Population ==
Historical population
| Year | Pop. | ±% p.a. |
|---|---|---|
| 1968 | 253 | — |
| 1975 | 266 | +0.72% |
| 1982 | 282 | +0.84% |
| 1990 | 253 | −1.35% |
| 1999 | 254 | +0.04% |
| 2007 | 263 | +0.44% |
| 2012 | 260 | −0.23% |
| 2017 | 248 | −0.94% |
| 2023 | 234 | −0.96% |
Source: INSEE

== See also ==
- Communes of the Jura department
