= Longchaumois =

Commune in Bourgogne-Franche-Comté, France

- Commune
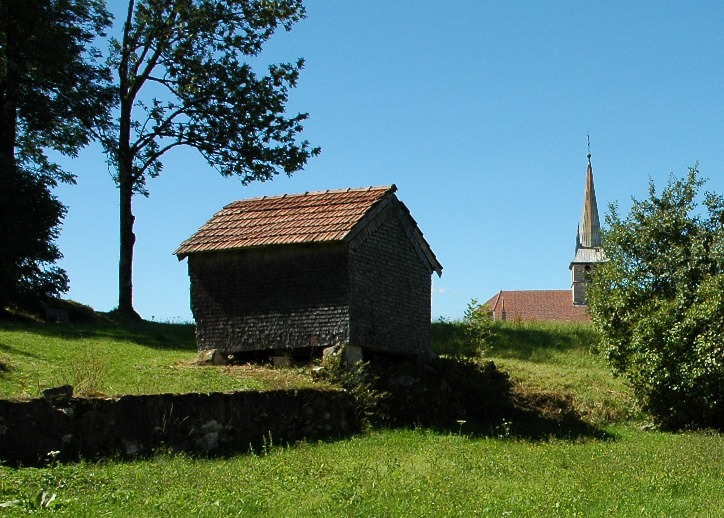
- A Juran grain store in Longchaumois

- Coat of arms
- Location of Longchaumois
- Location within France Location within Bourgogne-Franche-Comté
- Coordinates: 46°27′41″N 5°56′00″E
- Country: France
- Region: Bourgogne-Franche-Comté
- Department: Jura
- Arrondissement: Saint-Claude
- Canton: Hauts de Bienne
- Intercommunality: CC Haut-Jura Arcade

Government
  - Mayor (2020–2026): Yann Bondier-Moret
- Area^{1}: 57.60 km^{2} (22.24 sq mi)
- Highest elevation: 1,411 m (4,629 ft)
- Lowest elevation: 470 m (1,540 ft)
- Population (2023): 1,139
  - Density: 19.77/km^{2} (51.22/sq mi)
- Time zone: UTC+01:00 (CET)
  - Summer (DST): UTC+02:00 (CEST)
- INSEE/Postal code: 39297 /39400
- ^{1} French Land Register data, which excludes lakes, ponds, glaciers > 1 km^{2} (0.386 sq mi or 247 acres) and river estuaries.

Longchaumois (French pronunciation: [lɔ̃ʃomwa]) is a commune in the Jura department in Bourgogne-Franche-Comté in eastern France.

== Population ==
Historical population
Year	Pop.	±% p.a.
1968	741	—
1975	671	−1.41%
1982	741	+1.43%
1990	945	+3.09%
1999	1,092	+1.62%
2007	1,135	+0.48%
2012	1,171	+0.63%
2017	1,167	−0.07%
2023	1,139	−0.40%
Source: INSEE

== See also ==
- Communes of the Jura department
