= Guillaume Dubufe =

French painter, decorator and illustrator (1853–1909)

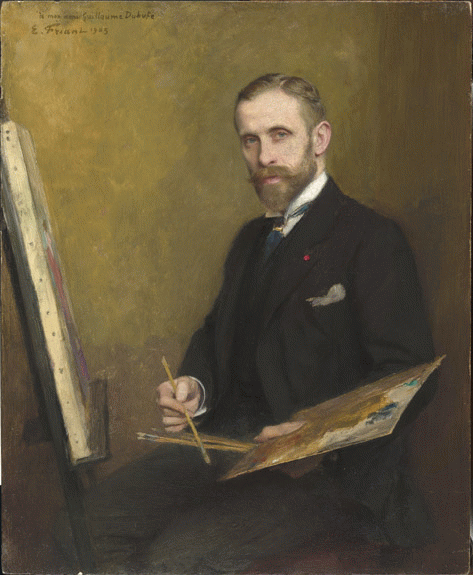
Guillaume Dubufe; portrait by Émile Friant (1905)

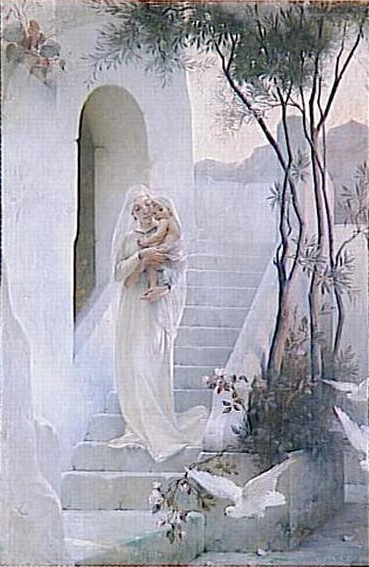
The House of the Virgin (1890)

Guillaume Édouard Marie Dubufe (16 May 1853, Paris – 25 May 1909, at sea, near Buenos Aires) was a French painter, decorator and illustrator.

== Biography ==
His father Édouard was a painter and his mother Juliette Dubufe (the daughter of composer Pierre-Joseph-Guillaume Zimmermann) was a sculptor. His grandfather, Claude, was also a painter and Charles Gounod was his uncle. Sadly, his mother died while giving birth to his sister Hortense when he was only two.

As might be expected, he received his first art lessons from his father, then pursued his studies at the École des Beaux-Arts under Alexis-Joseph Mazerolle. His first major commission involved decorating the ceiling of the foyer at the Comédie-Française

When not staying at their mansion in Paris, his family (he had five children) stayed at their villa in Anacapri on the Isle of Capri, where he painted scenes of his home that would be exhibited in 1906 at the Georges Petit Gallery. From 1888 to 1890, he produced a series of paintings featuring the Virgin Mary. During the 1890s, he decorated the ceilings of the Lobau Gallery at the Hôtel de Ville of Paris, the banquet hall at the Élysée Palace and the library at the Sorbonne. In 1896, he designed and produced the décor for the "Salon National des Beaux-Arts". Four years later, he was one of several artists who provided decorations for Le Train Bleu, a famous restaurant near the Gare de Lyon. From 1906 to 1909, he and Édouard Rosset-Granger decorated the Hôtel de Ville of Saint-Mandé. He also illustrated several works by the French dramatist Émile Augier.

He died suddenly on 25 May 1909, off the coast of Brazil, aboard the transatlantic liner that was taking him there. His friend, the sculptor Albert Bartholomé provided the bas-relief for his memorial at Père Lachaise cemetery. In 1921, his mansion in Paris was acquired by Marie Henner, who turned it into a museum. It was donated to the French government in 1926, and is now known as the Musée national Jean-Jacques Henner.

His daughter Juliette Dubufe-Wehrlé, also became a painter.

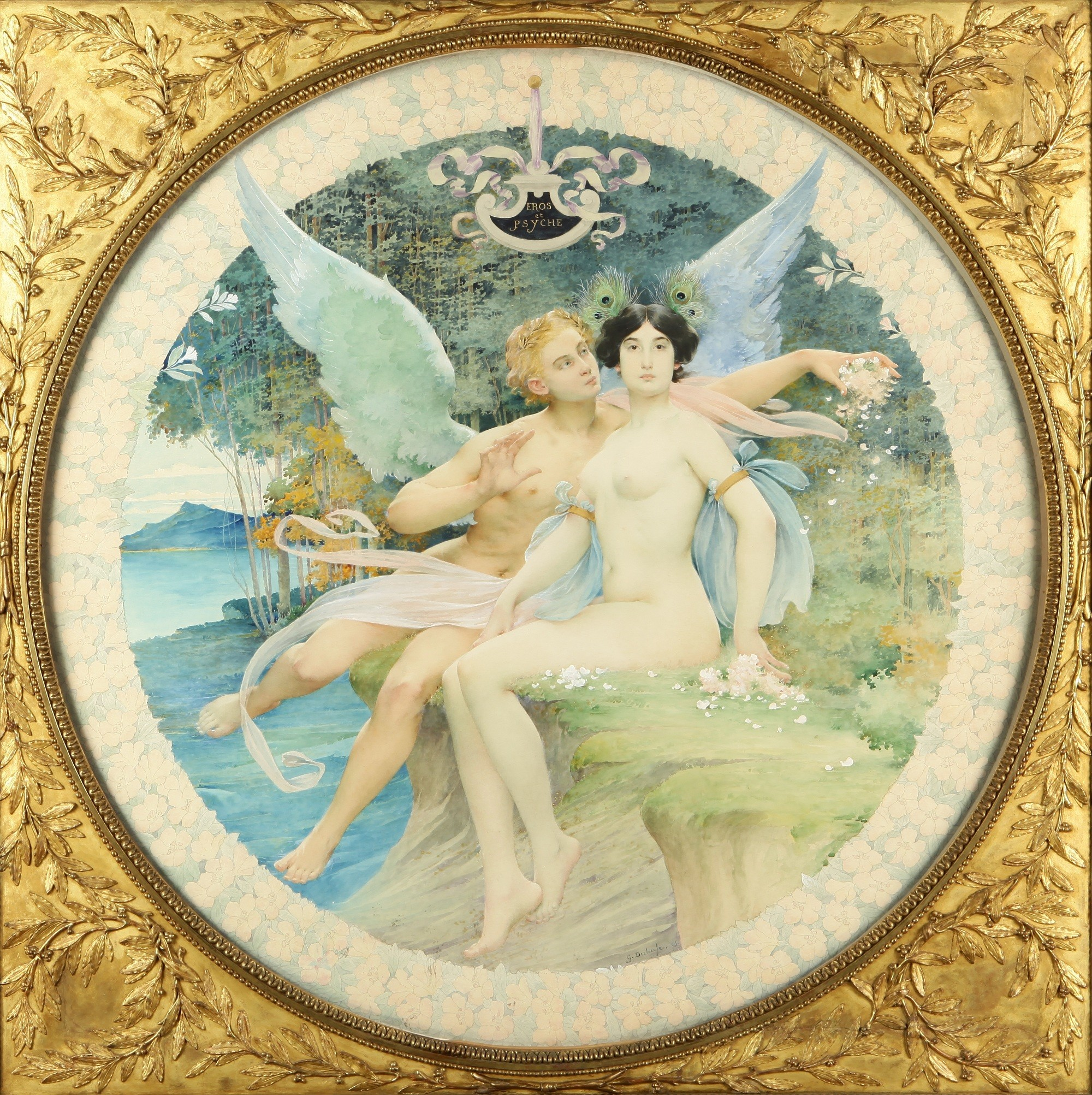
Eros and Psyche

== Writings ==
- La Valeur de l'Art, in the series, "Bibliothèque de philosophie scientifique", éditions E. Flammarion, 1908.
