= French ship Mytho =

Three ships of the French Navy have borne the name Mytho or My-Tho, after the Vietnamese city of Mỹ Tho, to commemorate the Capture of Mỹ Tho in 1861:

== Ships ==
- Mytho (1880), an Annamite-class hospital ship.
- Mytho (1934), a gunboat, lead ship of her class.
- Mytho (M618, 1955), formerly USS AM-475, an Aggressive-class minesweeper.
Ships of the French Navy named Mytho
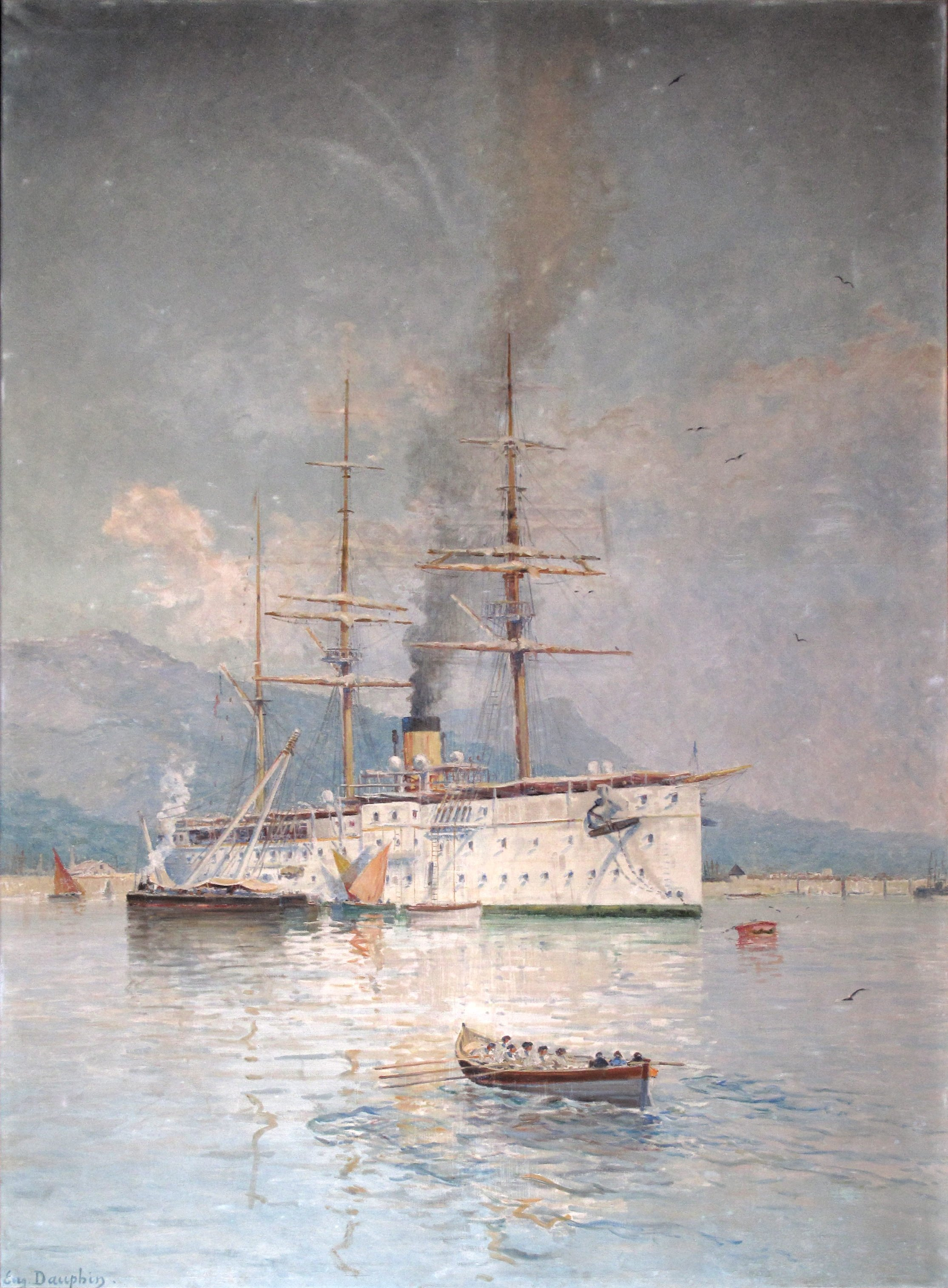
Mytho (1880), painting by Eugène Dauphin

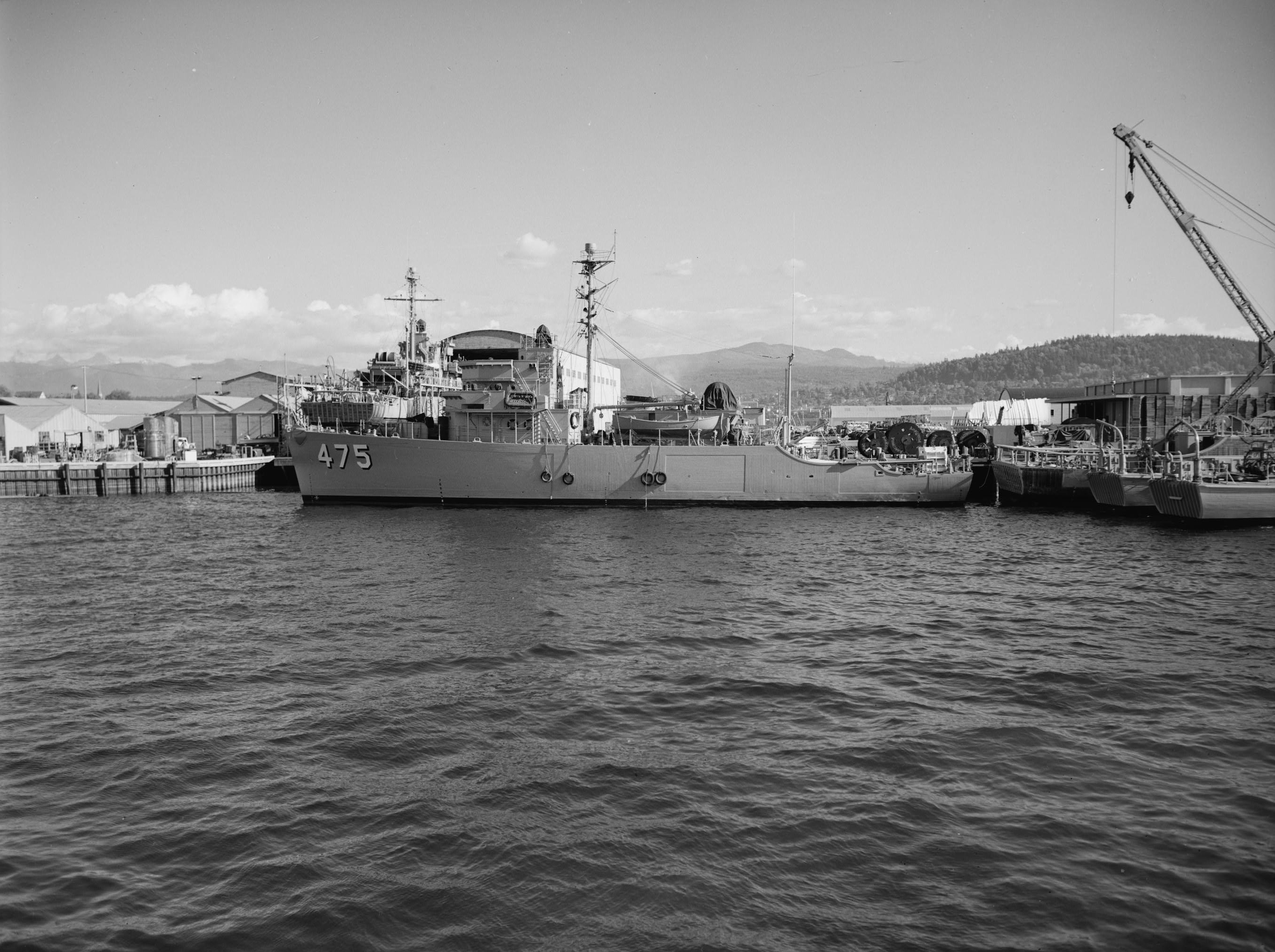
Mytho (1955) fitting out in 1953

== Notes and references ==
=== Bibliography ===
- Roche, Jean-Michel (2005). Dictionnaire des bâtiments de la flotte de guerre française de Colbert à nos jours. Vol. 1. Group Retozel-Maury Millau. pp. 372–373. ISBN 978-2-9525917-0-6. OCLC 165892922.
- Roche, Jean-Michel (2005). Dictionnaire des bâtiments de la flotte de guerre française de Colbert à nos jours. Vol. 2. Group Retozel-Maury Millau. p. 250. ISBN 978-2-9525917-0-6. OCLC 165892922.
