= Chaussée de l'Étang =

Street in Île-de-France, France

Coordinates: 48.8398°N 2.4207°E

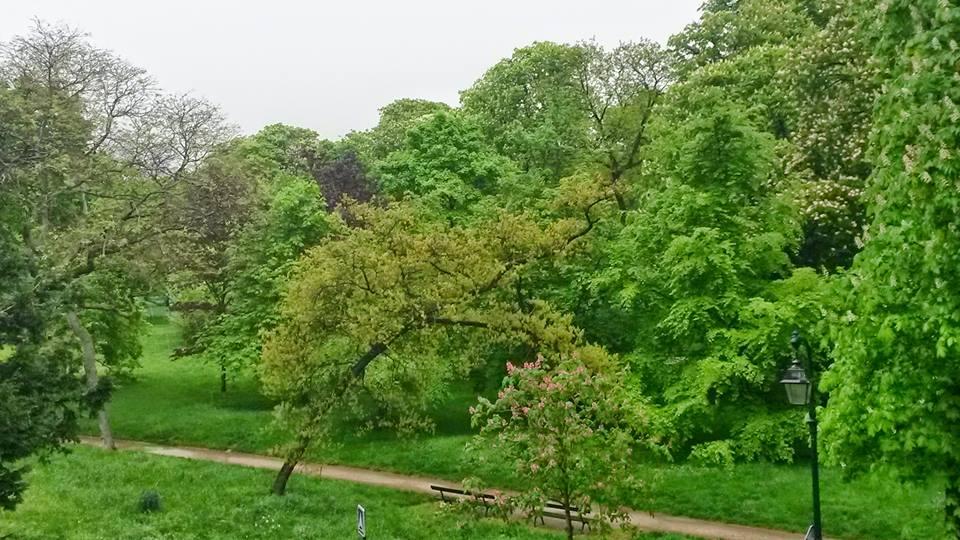
View of the Bois de Vincennes at the Chaussée de l'Étang

The Chaussée de l’Étang is a street in the city of Saint-Mandé in the Val-de-Marne and, since 1992, part of the 12th arrondissement of Paris, France (more precisely the "Bel-Air" southern neighbourhood). The buildings are located on the even numbers side, under the administration of the city of Saint-Mandé. The other side being the Bois de Vincennes, attached to the 12th arrondissement, administrated by the City of Paris.

== History ==
The Chaussée de l'Étang is an historical street of the city, as it was first referred to during the construction of the Château de Vincennes in the 13th century. Then, around 1275, Philippe Le Hardi (Philip III of France) removed all Saint-Mandé's inhabitants to prepare the infrastructure of the castle. Those found a new place along the lake (the lac de Saint-Mandé), on the edge of the castle walls. This is the birth of the "Chiaussée de l'Estanc" (old French), mentioned for the first time in 1276.

== Notable sites ==
The Chaussée de l'Étang starts at the Avenue Daumesnil (Paris) and ends at the Route de la Tourelle. It has a partial view on the Saint-Mandé pond (lac de Saint-Mandé), and faces the Bois de Vincennes.

- The street is considered an up-market residential neighbourhood of Saint-Mandé, with buildings dating from the 19th century and beginning of the 20th century. They are considered the most luxurious residences of Saint-Mandé because of their direct view on the forest or on the lake.
- The Guard House located at no. 44, built in the 16th century.
- The manor house at no. 84 was built in 1912 at the request of the famous painter Henry Gaulet.
- The building at no. 90bis, built by the architect Aristide Daniel in 1930, representing the Art Deco residential style.
- A maternity clinic (closed in the 1970s) carried the name of the street. Today, the closest maternity clinic would be the Bégin Hospital.
- The City Public Library.
- The Carousels of the Bois de Vincennes.

== Access ==
The Chaussée de l'Étang is located on line 1 of the Paris Métro at the station Saint-Mandé (formerly Saint-Mandé Tourelle) and Bérault, and by a few RATP buses with lines 46, 86, 325.
