= Édouard Rosset-Granger =

French painter

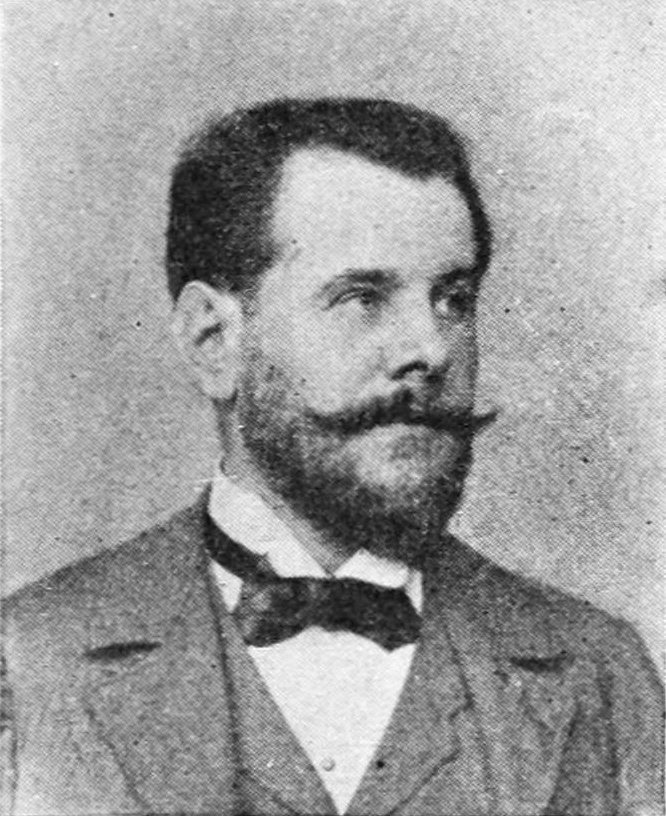
Édouard Rosset-Granger

Paul Édouard Rosset-Granger (9 July 1853 – 26 July 1934) was a French genre and portrait painter who adopted the academic style.

== Biography ==
Rosset-Granger was born in 1853 Vincennes. He studied at the École des Beaux-Arts in Paris under Alexandre Cabanel, Édouard Louis Dubufe and Alexis-Joseph Mazerolle. He painted portraits, landscapes and genre works, and also made illustrations for the press and publishing houses. From 1878, he exhibited mythological and genre works at the Paris Salons and at the Sociéte nationale des beaux-arts, receiving medals in 1889 and 1890. From 1906 to 1909, he worked with Guillaume Dubufe on decorating the Hôtel de Ville in Saint-Mandé. In 1900, he was invited to paint Le Train blue on a decorative panel for the Gare de Lyon restaurant in Paris.

In their style, colour, composition and choice of subjects, Rosset-Granger's works benefited from his familiarity with Bouguereau, Boulanger and Lefebvre.

From 1906, his studio was located at 45 ave de Villiers in the 17th arrondissement of Paris.

He died on 26 July 1934 in his studio located at 17 Avenue Gourgaud in the 17th arrondissement of Paris.

== Selected works ==
Watercolours

- Nu à la lampe à petrole.
- Nature morte à la lecture.

Oils

- Orphée 1884.
- La Cueillette des figues à Capri 1887.
- Portrait de Mme R. D. 1896.
- Tête de jeune paysanne. 1896.
- La somnambule. 1897.
- Portrait de A.B.. 1900.
- Portrait de Mt. G. S. 1906.
- Portrait de peintre Alfred Agache. 1980.
- L'arrivée au châteu. 1910.
- Élegante assise. 1910.

Illustrations

- Les Lettres et les arts. Revue illustré. 1886ff. ISSN 2019-0204.
- Gil Blas illustré. 1893ff. ISSN 1149-946X.
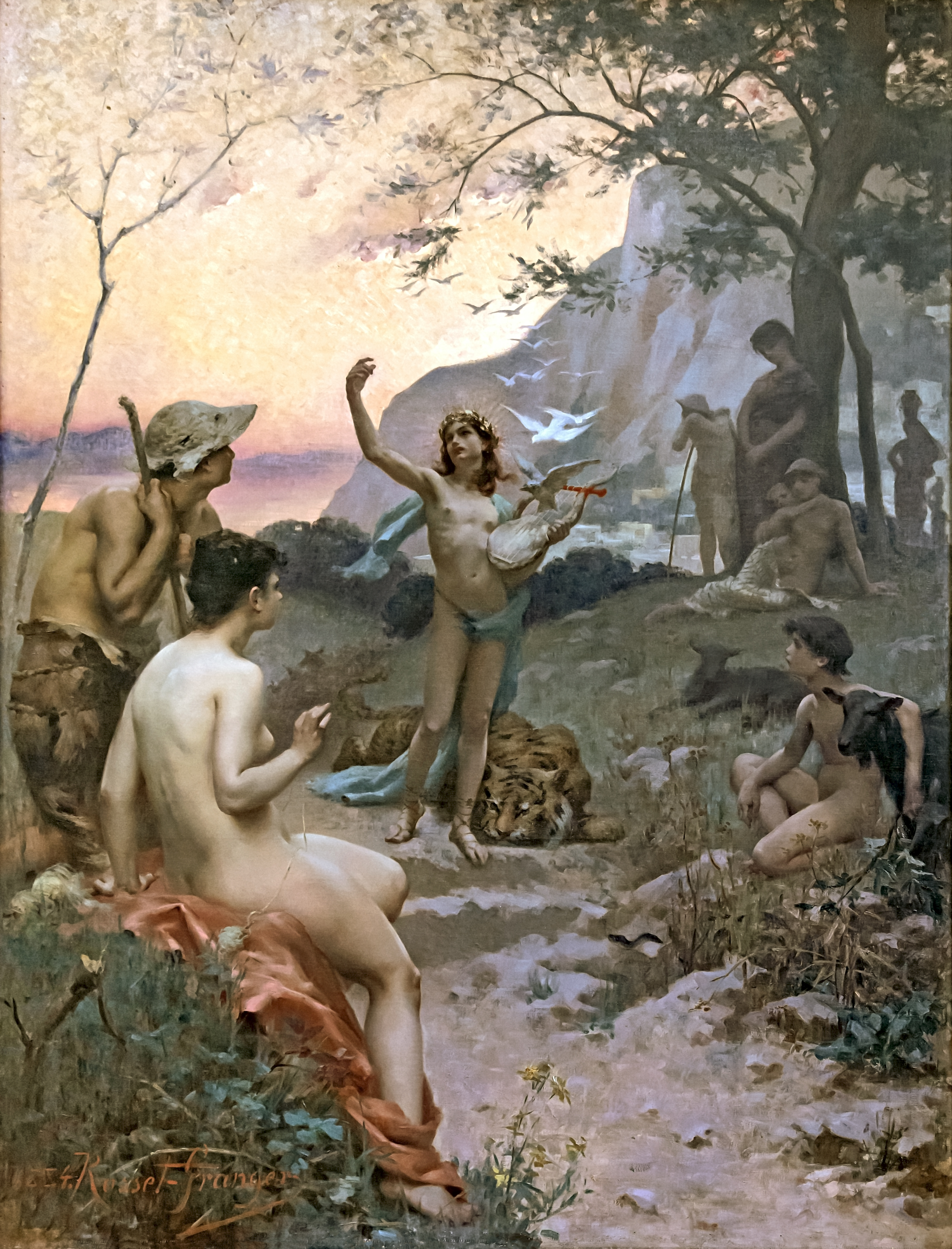
Orphée 1884
Musée des beaux-arts Carcassonne

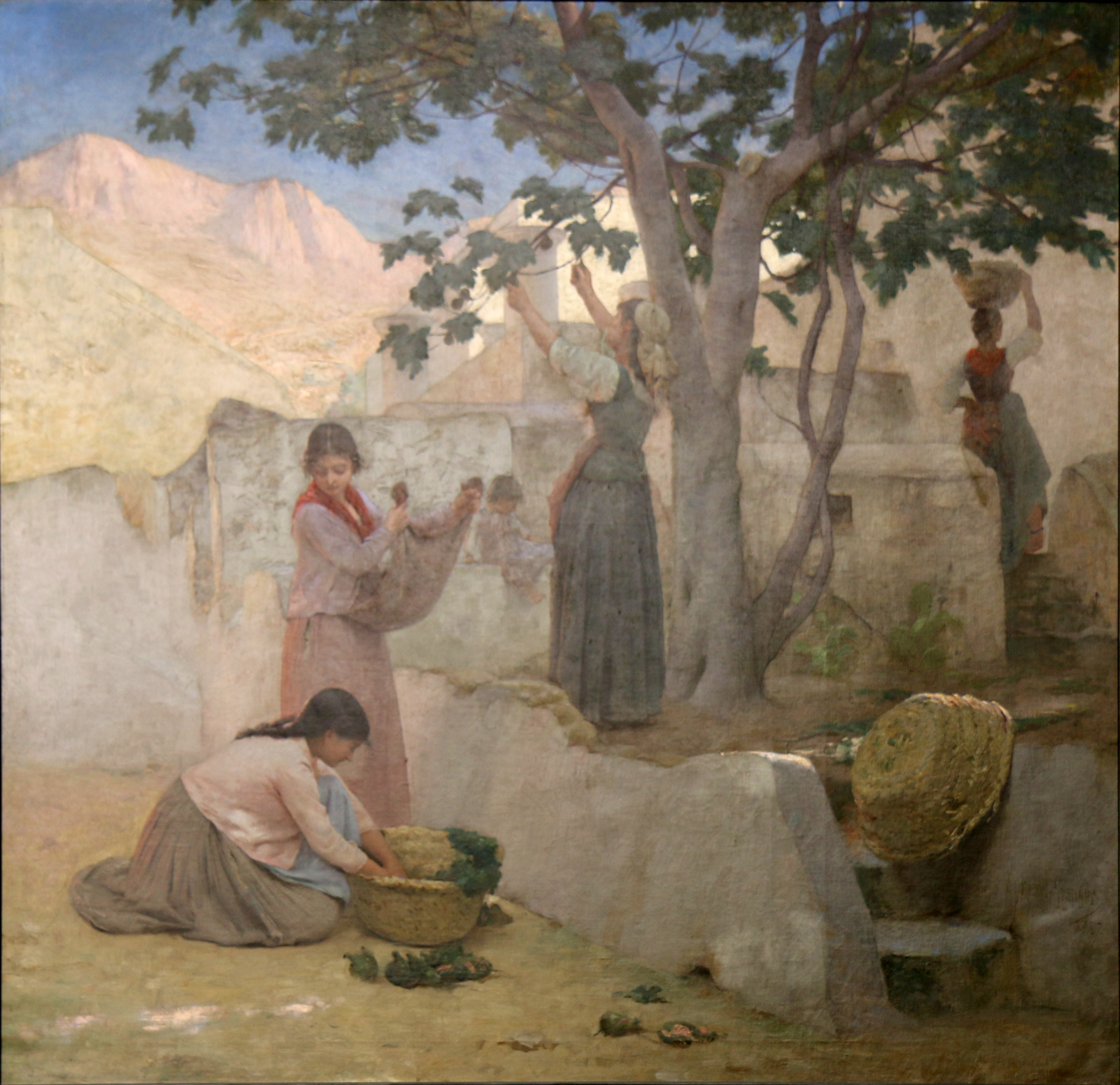
La Cueillette des figues à Capri 1887
Aix-en-Provence, Musée Granet

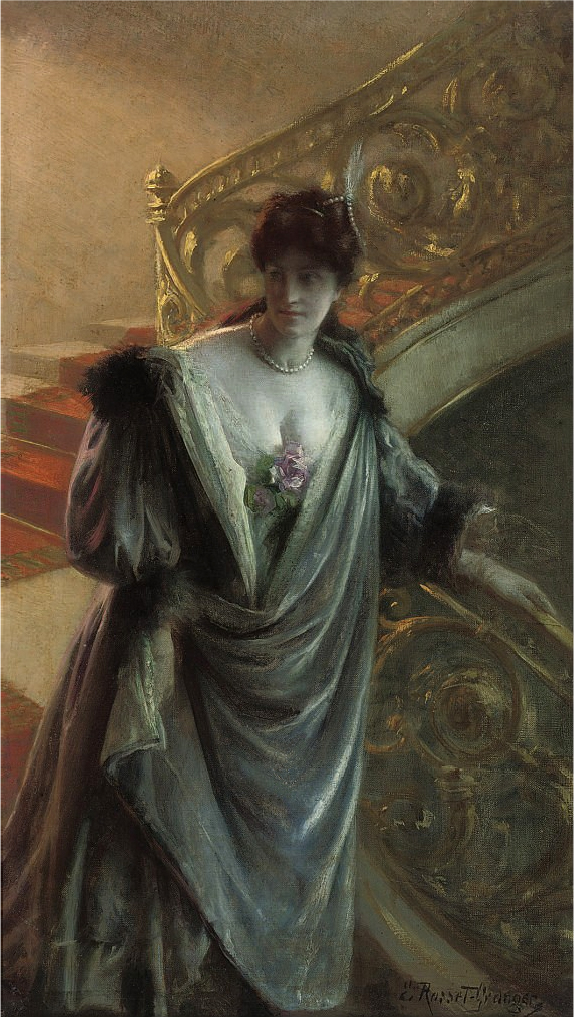
Dame dans un escalier

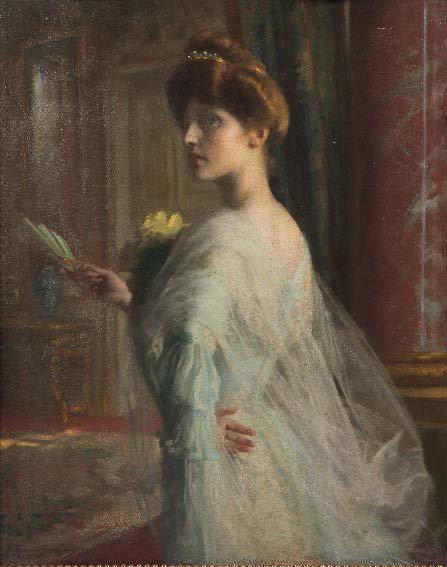
Élégante à l'éventail (c. 1910)

== Bibliography ==
- Émmanuel Bénézit (Hrsg.): Dictionnaire critique et documentaire des peintres, scuzlpteurs, dessinateurs et graveurs de tous les temps et de tous les pays. Grund, Paris 1999ff.
- Louise Gaggini u.a.: Le train bleu. PLUS Editions, Paris 1991, ISBN 2-908557-01-0.
- Sabrina da Conceiçao, Georges Barthe: Gypseries. Creaphis, Paris 2005, ISBN 2-913610-58-7.
