= Le Train Bleu (restaurant) =

Restaurant in Paris, France

Coordinates: 48°50′42″N 2°22′24″E

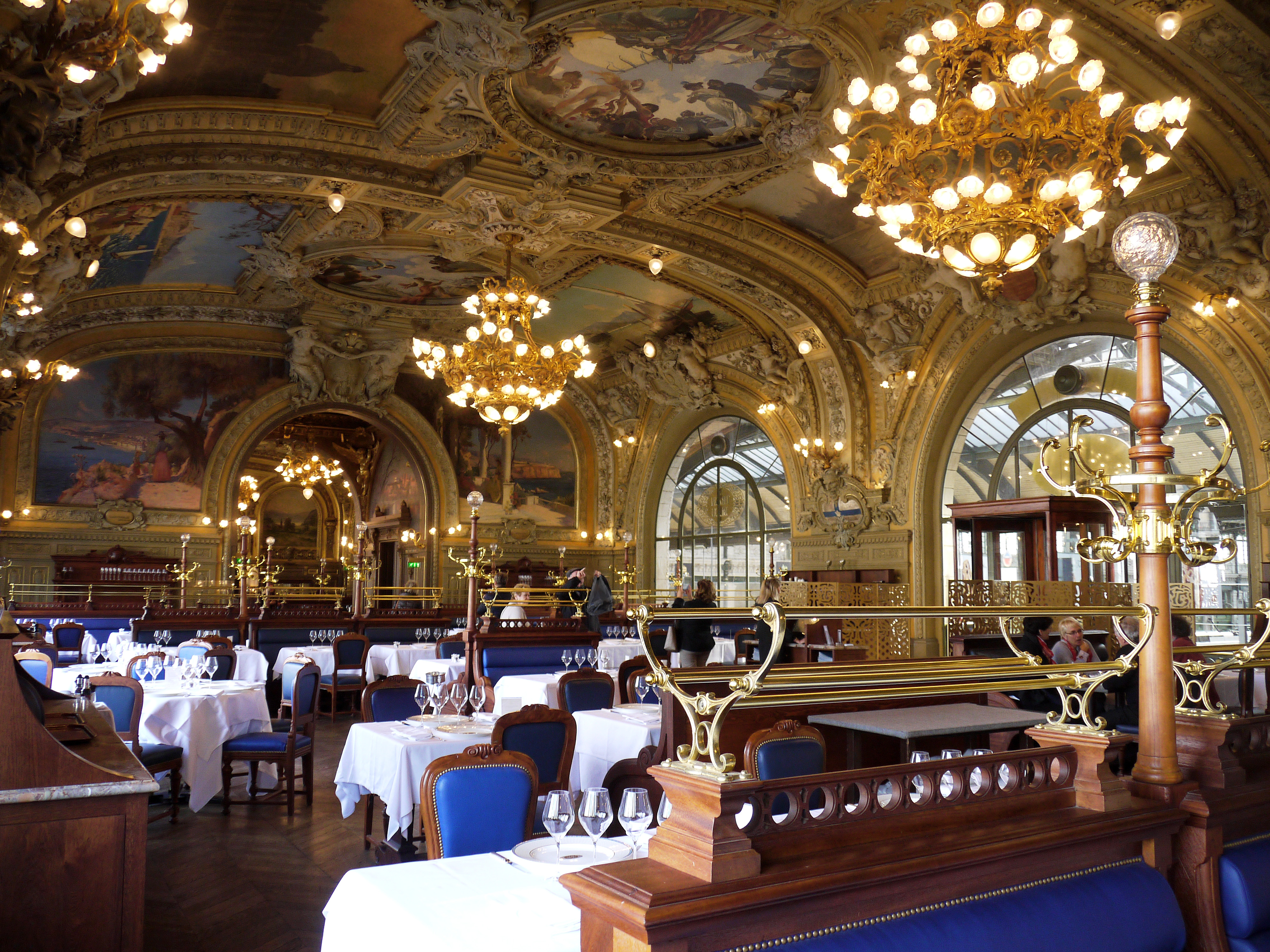
Dining Room at Le Train Bleu

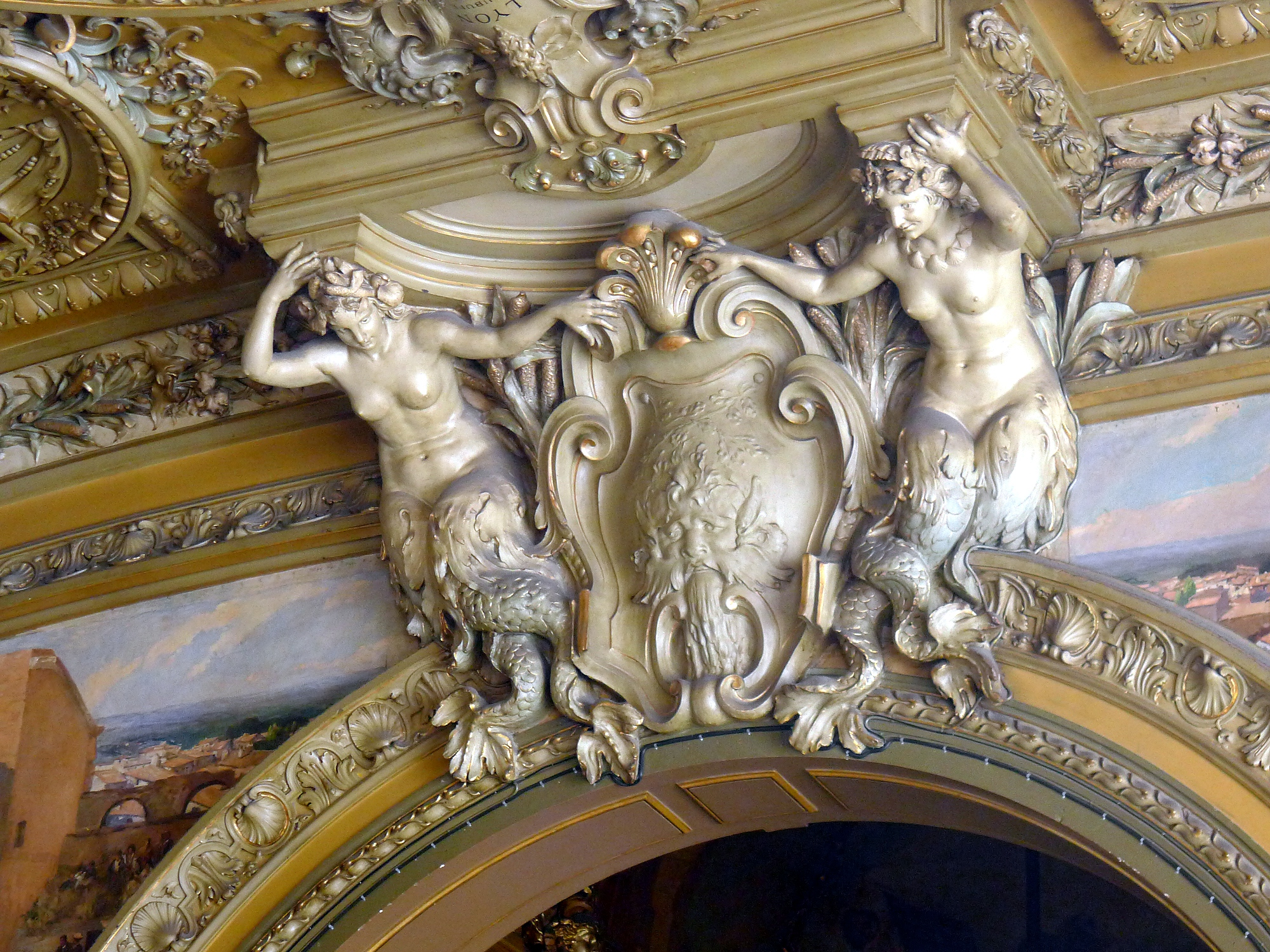
Caryatid.

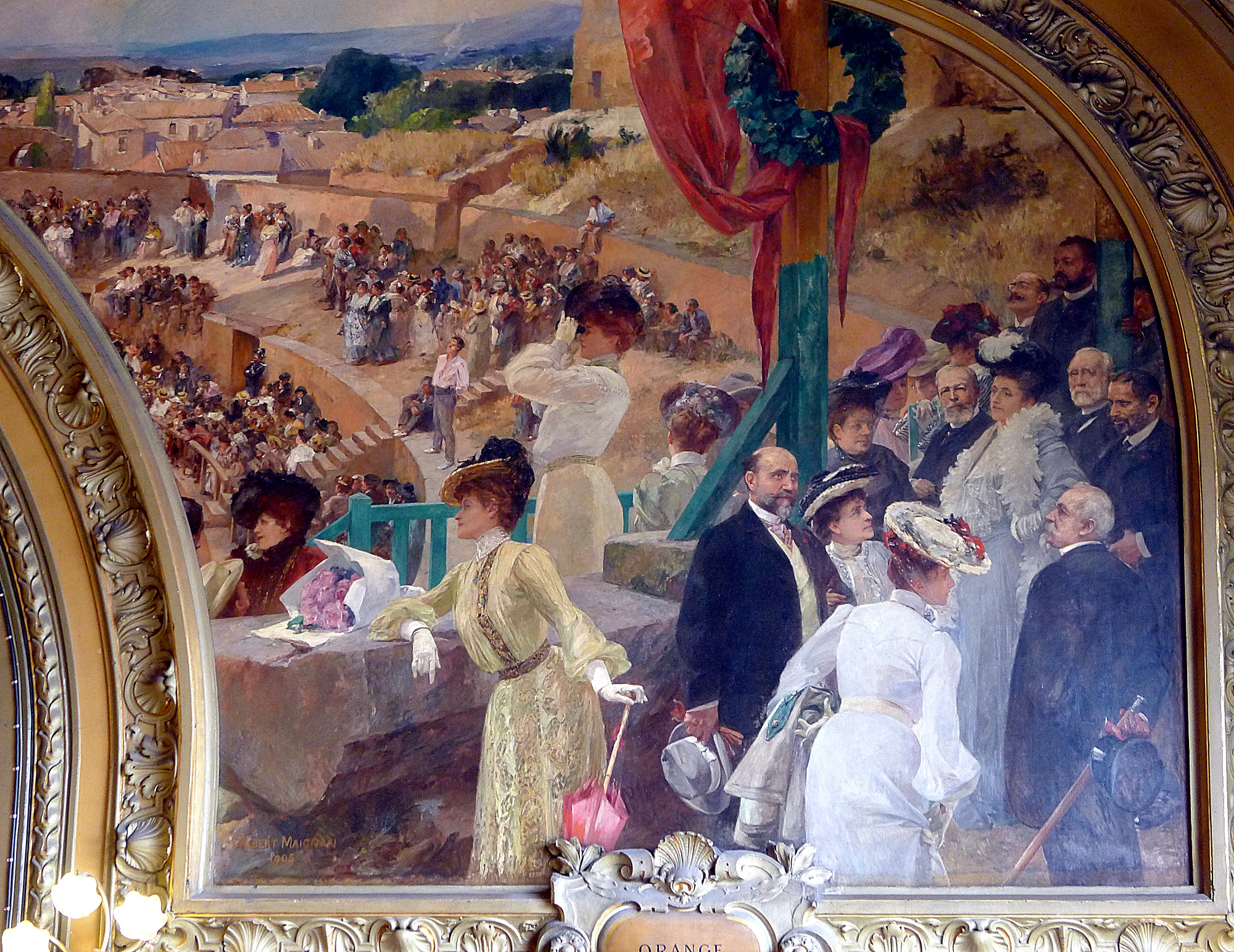
The city "Orange".

Le Train Bleu ("The Blue Train") is a restaurant located on the first floor of the hall of the Gare de Lyon railway station in Paris, France.

The restaurant was originally created for the Exposition Universelle (1900). Each ornate dining room is themed to represent cities and regions of France and they are decorated with 41 paintings by some of the most popular artists of that time.

Initially called "Buffet de la Gare de Lyon", it was renamed "Le Train Bleu" in 1963, after the famous train of the same name.

Saved from demolition by André Malraux in 1966, it was designated a Monument Historique in 1972.

== Artists who decorated Le Train Bleu ==
- Raymond Allègre
- Charles Bertier
- Eugène Burnand
- Eugène Dauphin
- Guillaume Dubufe
- François Flameng
- Henri Gervex
- Gaston La Touche
- Max Leenhardt
- Albert Maignan
- Frédéric Montenard
- Jean-Baptiste Olive
- Edmond Marie Petitjean
- Albert Rigolot
- Édouard Rosset-Granger
- Paul Saïn
- Gaston Casimir Saint-Pierre

== Le Train Bleu in films ==
The restaurant has appeared in several films, including:

- 1972: Travels with My Aunt, directed by George Cukor
- 1973 The Mother and the Whore, directed by Jean Eustache
- 1990: La Femme Nikita, directed by Luc Besson
- 1998: Place Vendôme, directed by Nicole Garcia
- 2003: Filles uniques, directed by Pierre Jolivet
- 2007: Mr. Bean's Holiday, directed by Steve Bendelack
- 2009: Micmacs, directed by Jean-Pierre Jeunet
