= Musée départemental de l'Oise =

Museum in the former bishop's palace in Beauvais, Oise, France

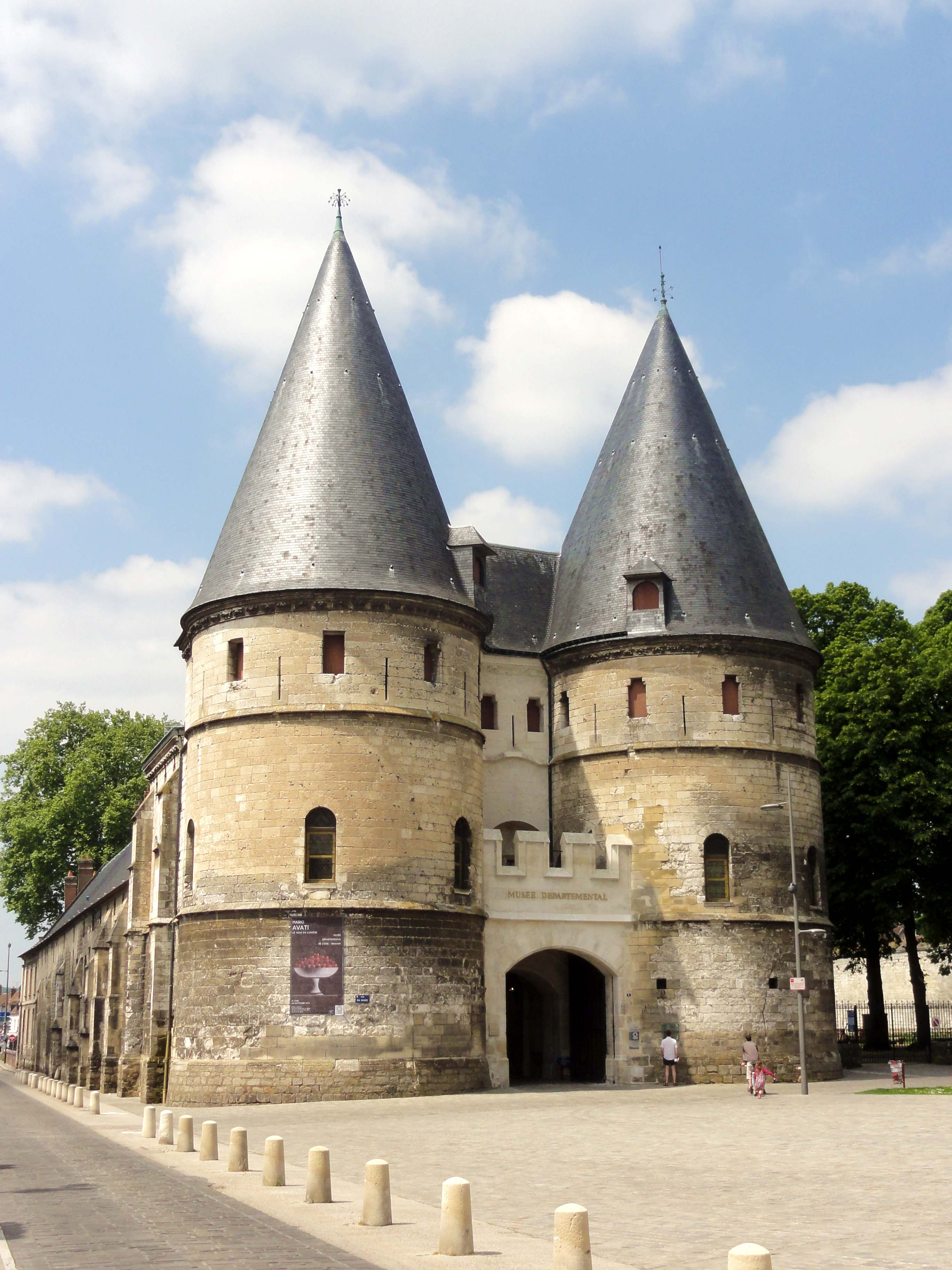
- Beauvais, Gates to enclosure of the Bishop's palace

- Location within France
- Established: 1981
- Location: 1 rue du musée 60000, Beauvais
- Coordinates: 49.432942°N 2.079854°E
- Website: mudo.oise.fr

The Musée départemental de l'Oise (MUDO, Museum of the Oise Department) is a museum in the former bishop's palace in Beauvais, Oise, in northern France. It is classified as a historical monument.

== Building history ==
The museum is housed in the former palace of the Bishop of Beauvais, who was also the Count of Beauvais and a peer of France. The original palace was built on a Roman wall below the Beauvais Cathedral by Henry of France (c. 1121–75), son of King Louis VI of France and Bishop of Beauvais from 1149 to 1161. Following a riot in the 14th century the bishop built a fortified entrance guarded by two towers. In the 16th century Bishop Louis Villiers de l’Isle Adam (1497–1521) rebuilt the palace in Renaissance style with Gothic decoration. The clock tower in the facade holds a stairway leading up to a belfry with three bells, one of them made in 1506.

After the French Revolution the palace was made the seat of the prefecture in 1800, then returned to the bishopric in 1822. In 1846 it became a courthouse. In 1848 Prosper Mérimée had the building placed on the list of historical monuments. The court moved out of the building in 1973, and renovations were made between 1974 and 1981, when the museum opened. The building began to show structural problems caused by the many visitors, and was closed to the public in 1997. Temporary exhibitions were given in the structurally sound sections of the building. A renovation project was started in 2013 and the museum reopened in January 2015. The renovation cost over €9.5 million, supported by the Oise Department in partnership with the Picardy Region.

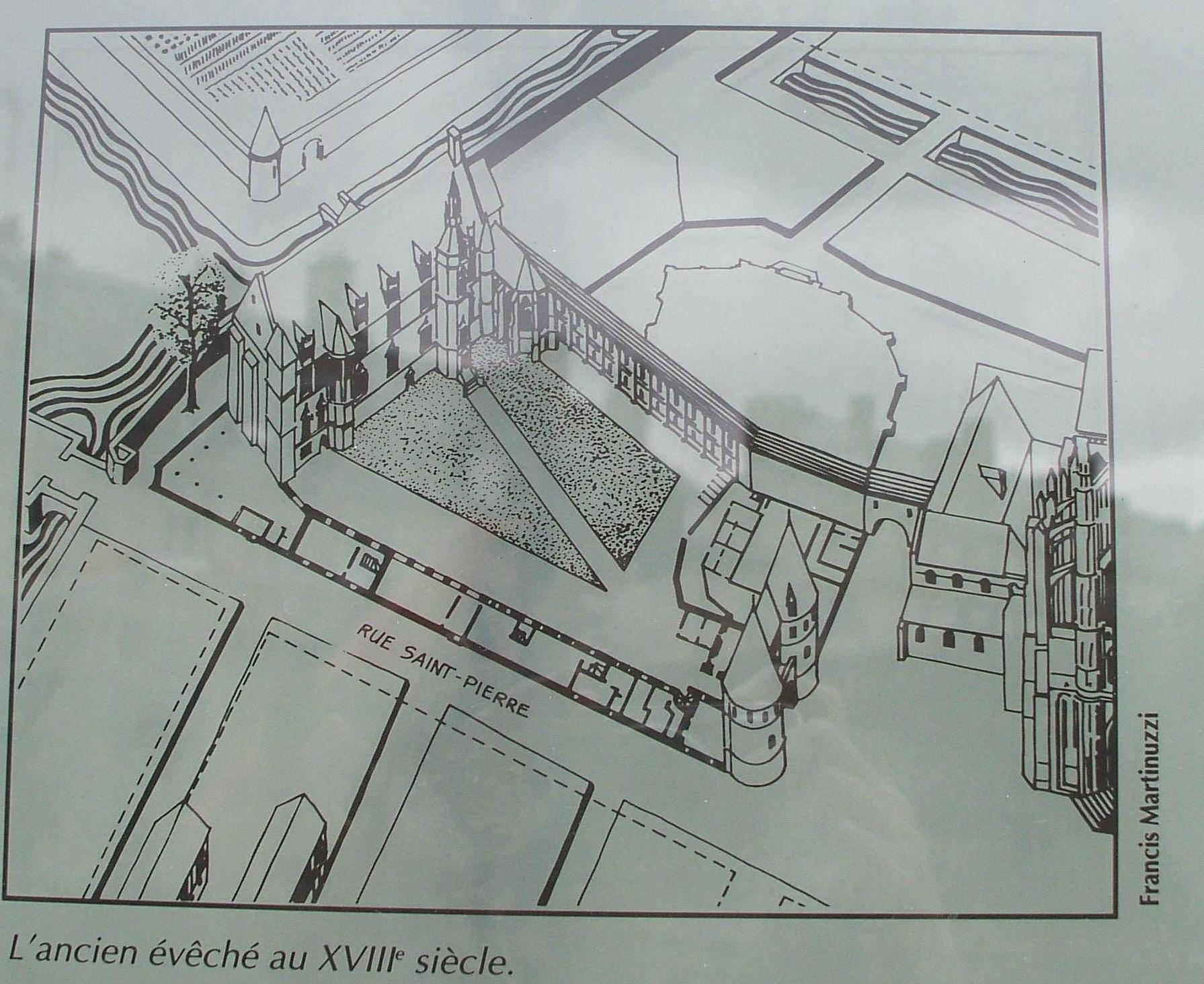
Plan

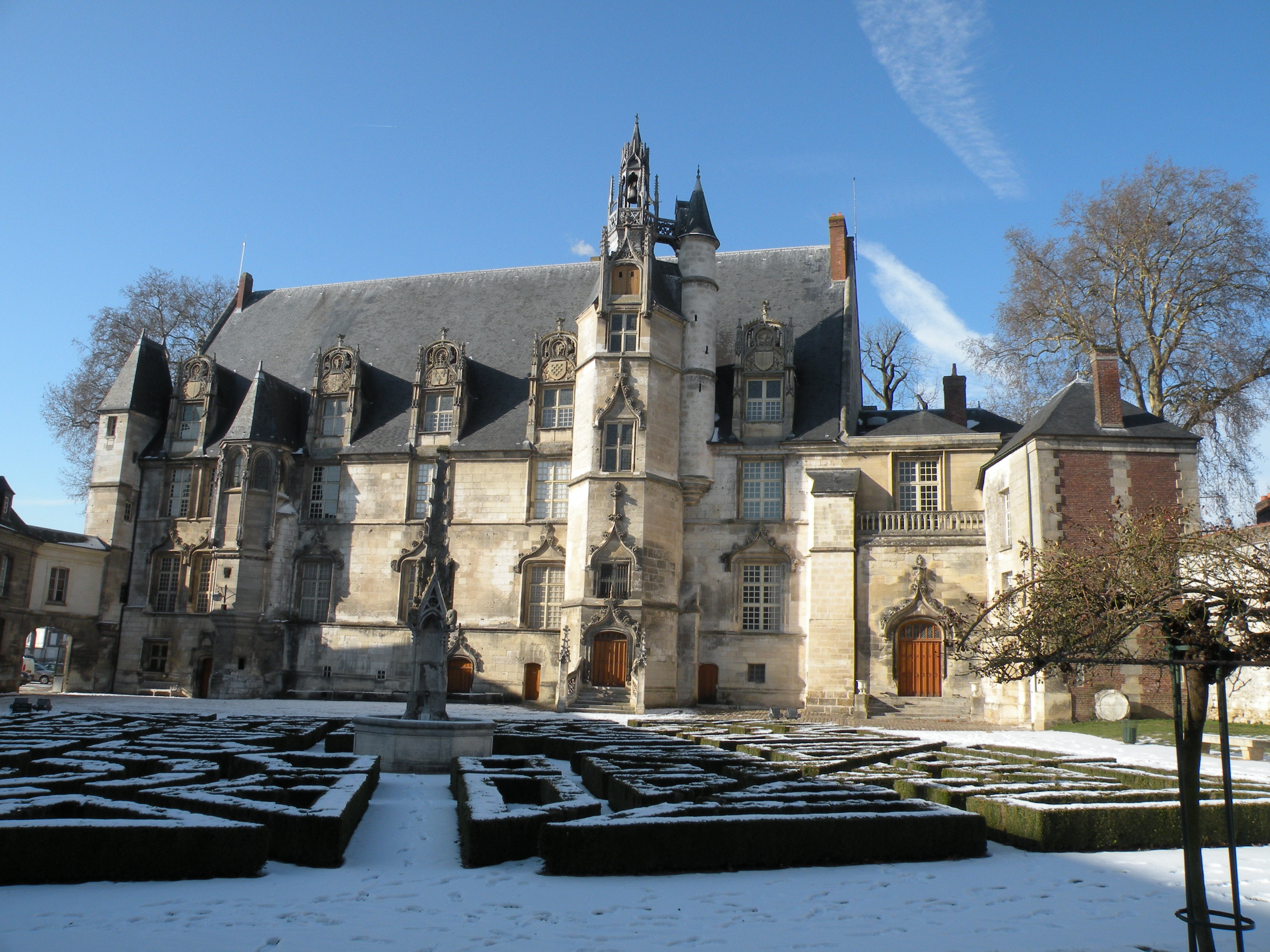
Facade with clock tower

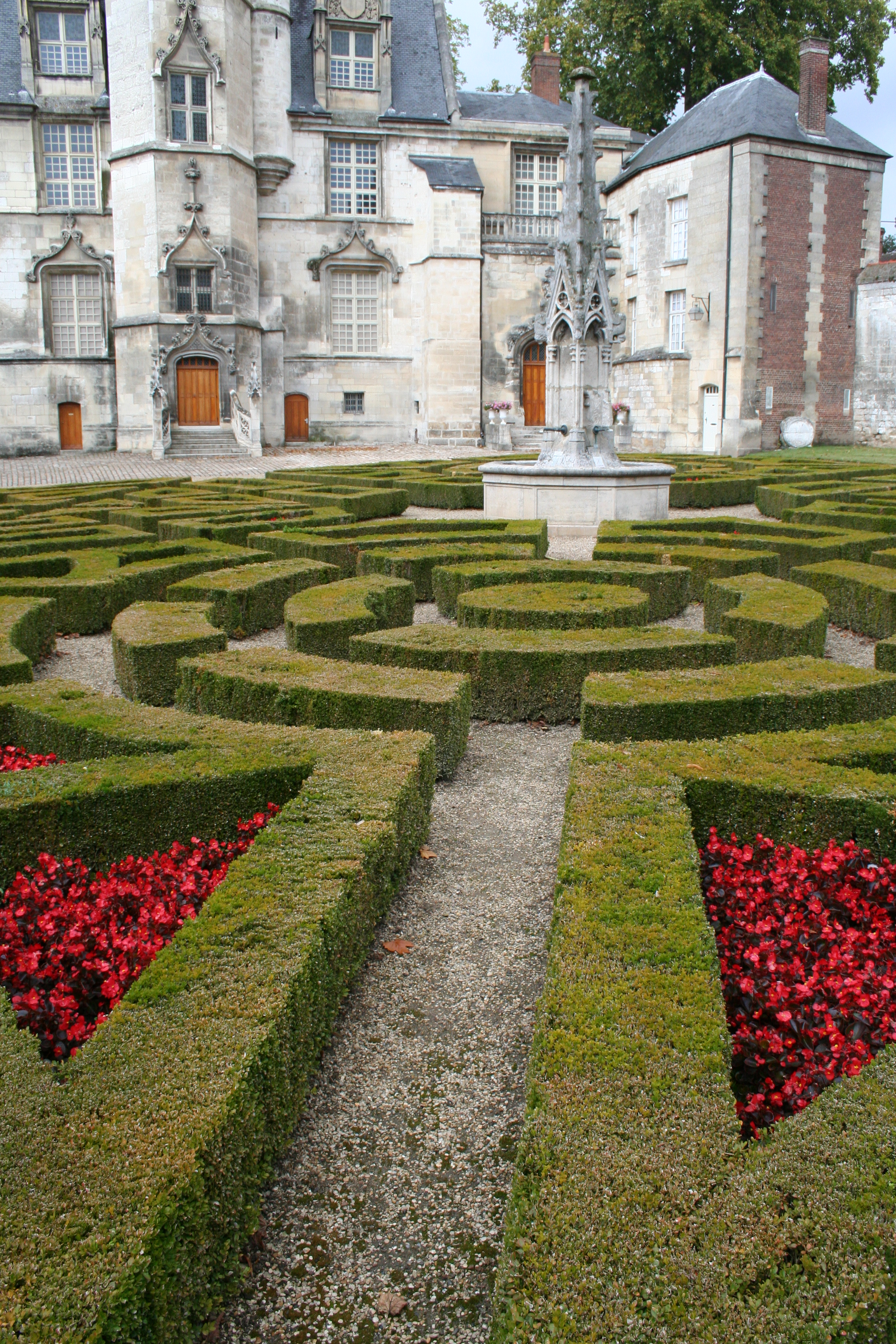
Gardens

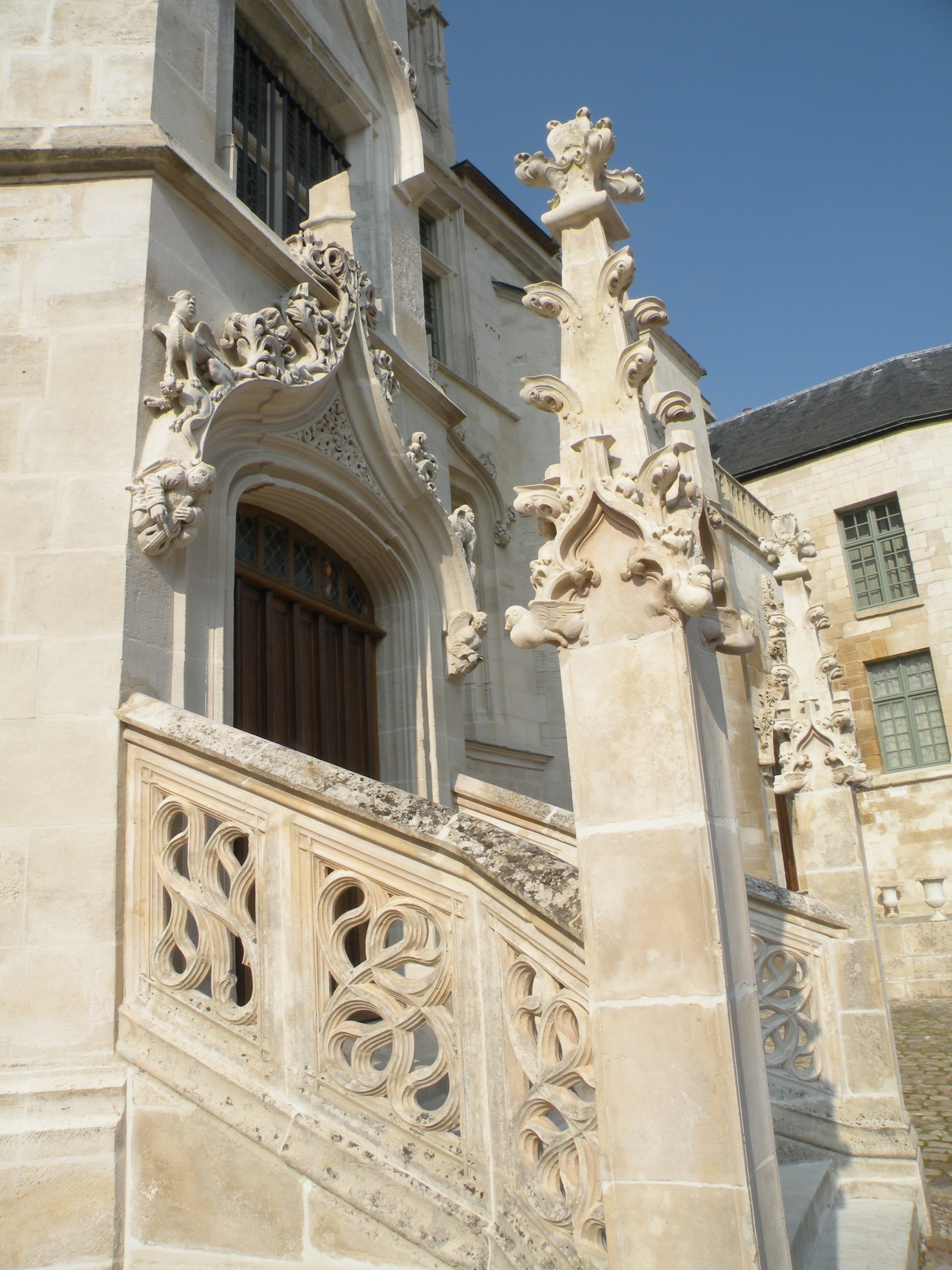
Side entrance

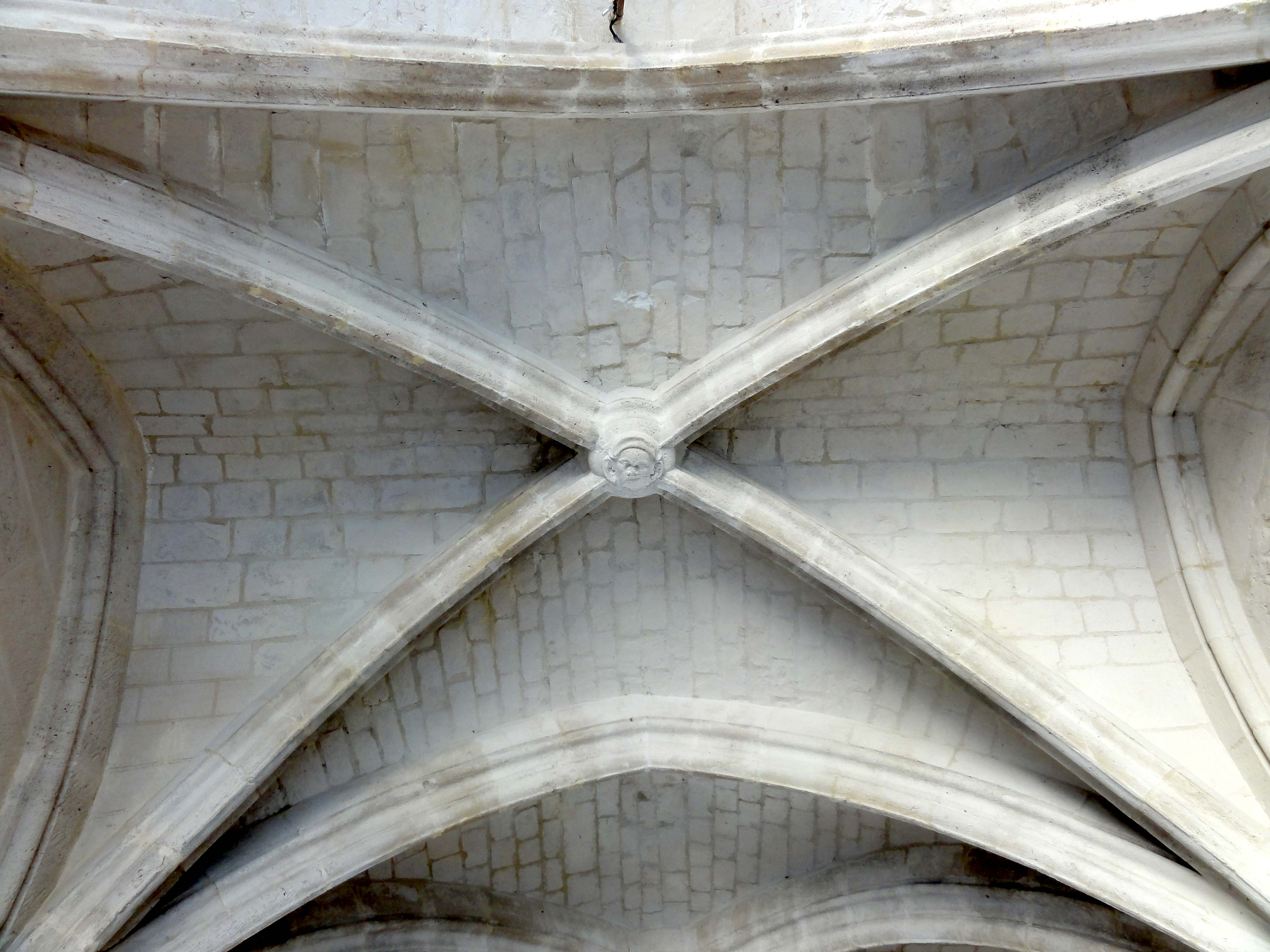
Entrance vaulted ceiling

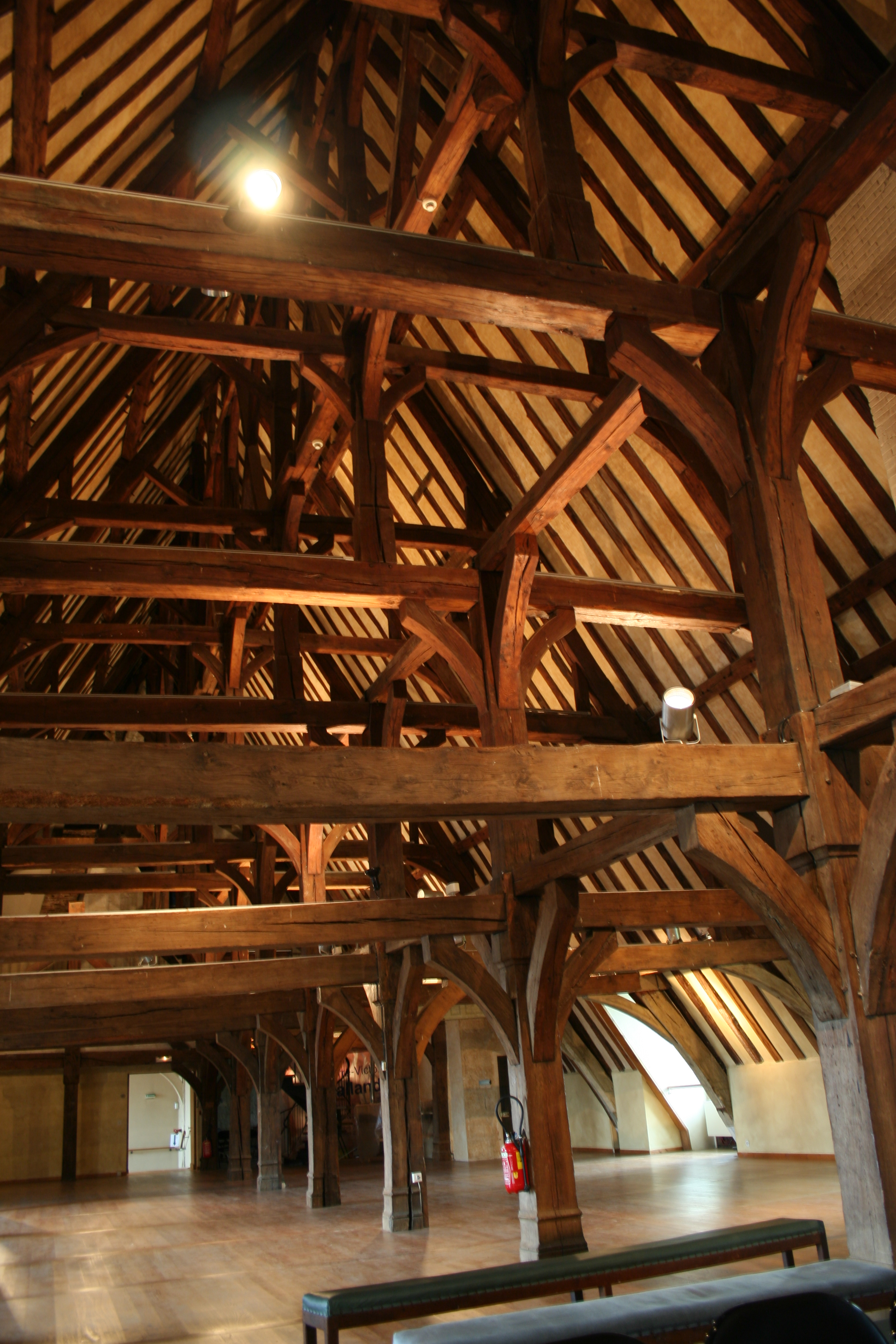
Attic

== Collection history ==
The historian Louis Graves and the Société académique de l'Oise began the museum collection in 1841 to preserve objects of artistic or historical interest. At first the collection was stored in various municipal offices, but it steadily outgrew the available space. In 1908 the city of Beauvais and the Société académique de l'Oise offered the collection to the departmental council of the Oise. In 1909 the department acquired a large building to the north of the cathedral. The museum was temporarily evacuated in 1918, during World War I (1914–18). During World War II (1939–45) most of the objects were destroyed when the museum was bombed in June 1940. In 1960 the remainder of the collection was installed in the attic of the former Bishop's Palace.

== Present museum ==
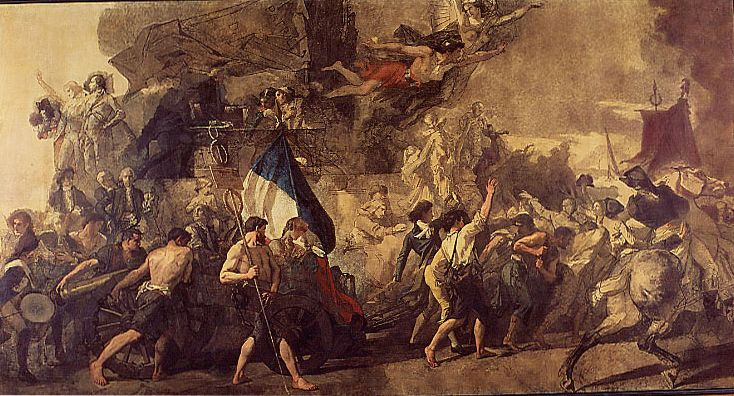
Enrôlement des volontaires de 1792 by Thomas Couture (1848)

The museum opened after a major renovation on 25 January 2015. In the center of the renovated Bishop's Palace the "19th Century Tour" leads past works by artists such as Camille Corot, Alfred Sisley, Paul Huet, Prosper Marilhat and Jean-Auguste-Dominique Ingres. There are decorative works by Alexis-Joseph Mazerolle and Pierre-Victor Galland, and ceramics by Jules-Claude Ziegler. The huge unfinished canvas Enrôlement des volontaires de 1792 by Thomas Couture is displayed in the old courtroom, along with many preparatory sketches. The museum puts on temporary exhibitions several times each year dedicated to specific artists or artistic movements, stages lectures and holds children's workshops.

The important Art Nouveau potter Auguste Delaherche was born in Beauvais, and later worked in the region. The museum has his bust by Pierre Félix Masseau, and also claims to have the "most important" collection of his ceramics.

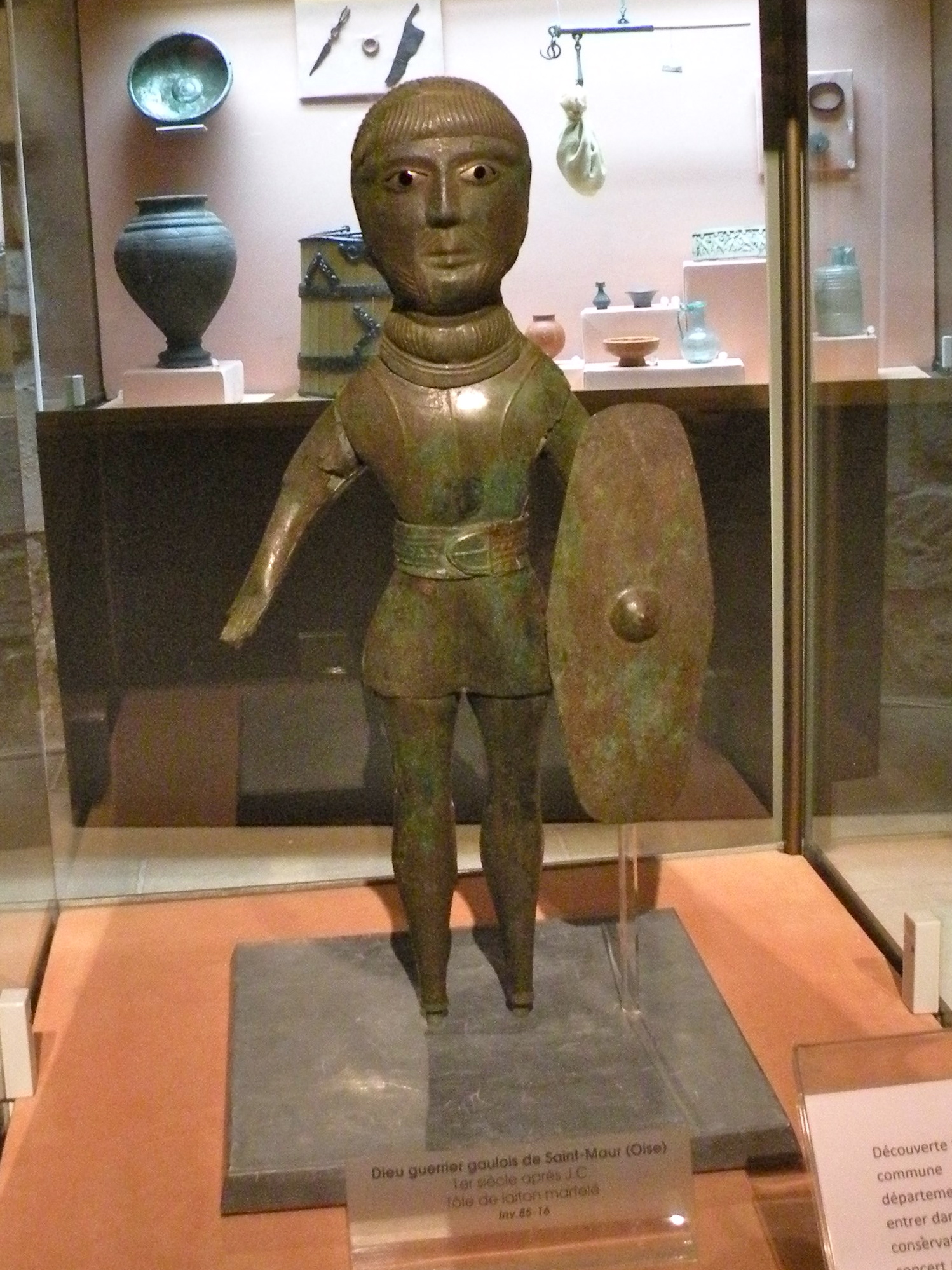
1st century brass statue of Gallic warrior

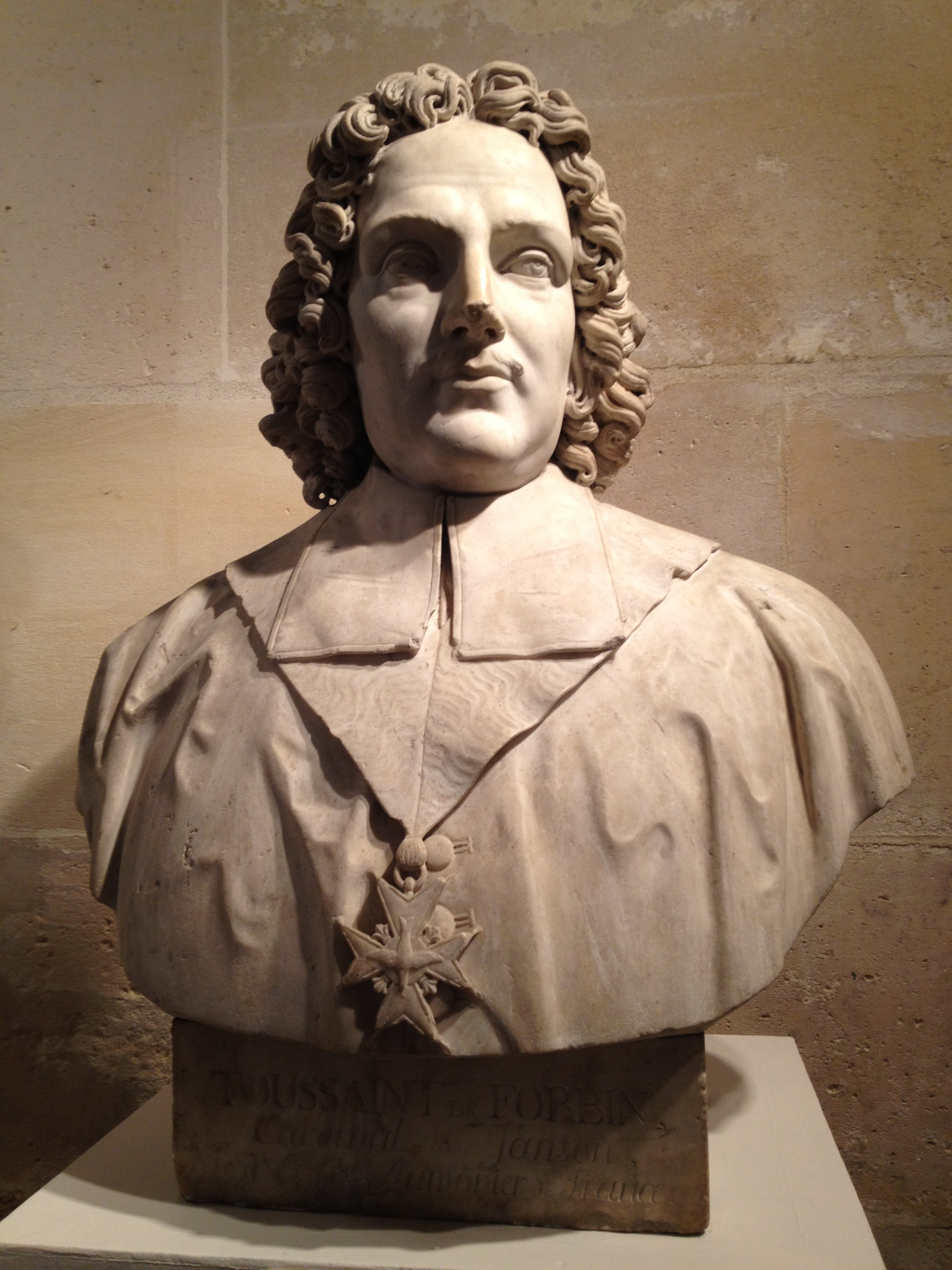
Bust of Toussaint de Forbin-Janson

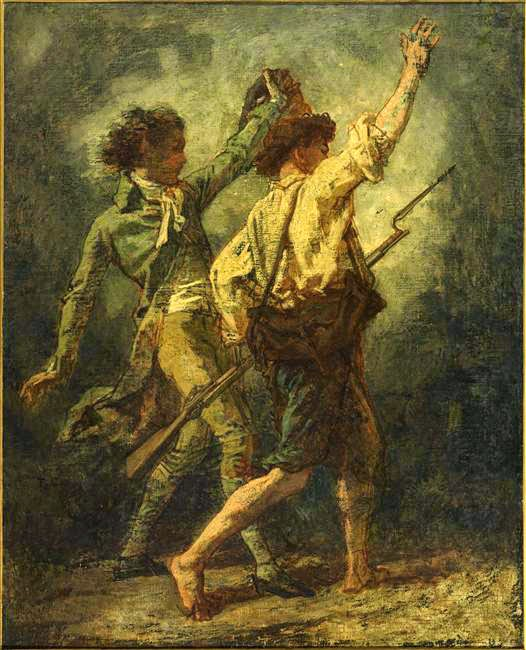
Two volunteers by Thomas Couture

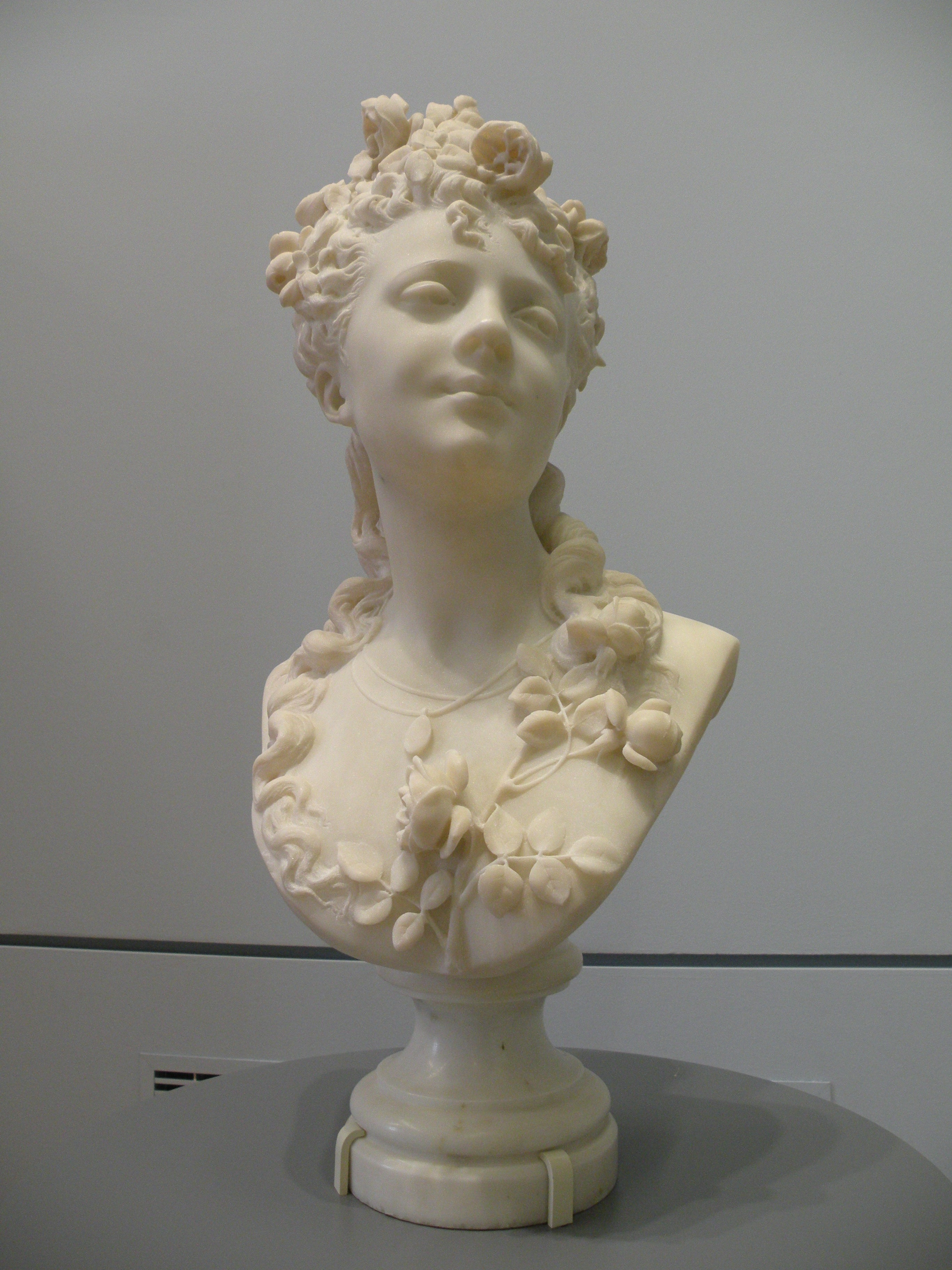
Woman with roses

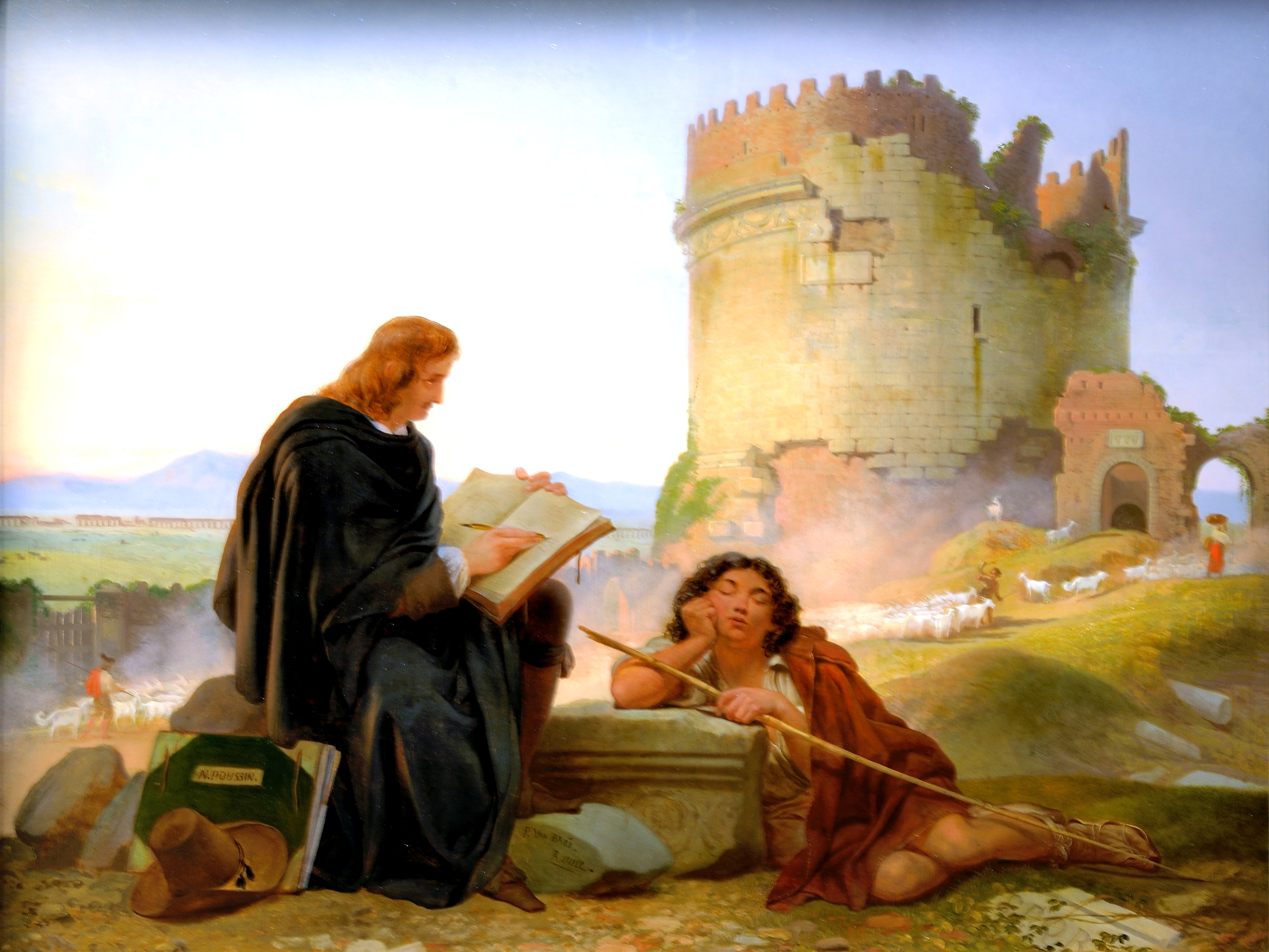
Nicolas Poussin dans la campagne romaine by William Frederick Yeames

== Sources ==
- "Le MUDO – Musée de l'Oise". Oise Département.
- "L'histoire du musée". MUDO.
- "L'histoire du palais". MUDO.
- "Musée de l'Oise". Mairie de Beauvais.
