= Juliette Dubufe =

French sculptor (1819–1855)

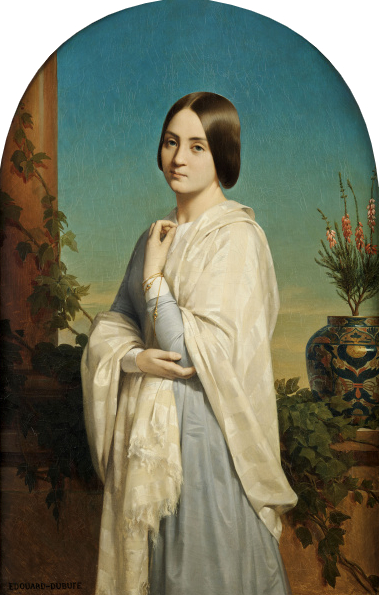
Portrait of Juliette Dubufe, 1840s, by her husband Édouard Dubufe (Paris, musée d'Orsay)

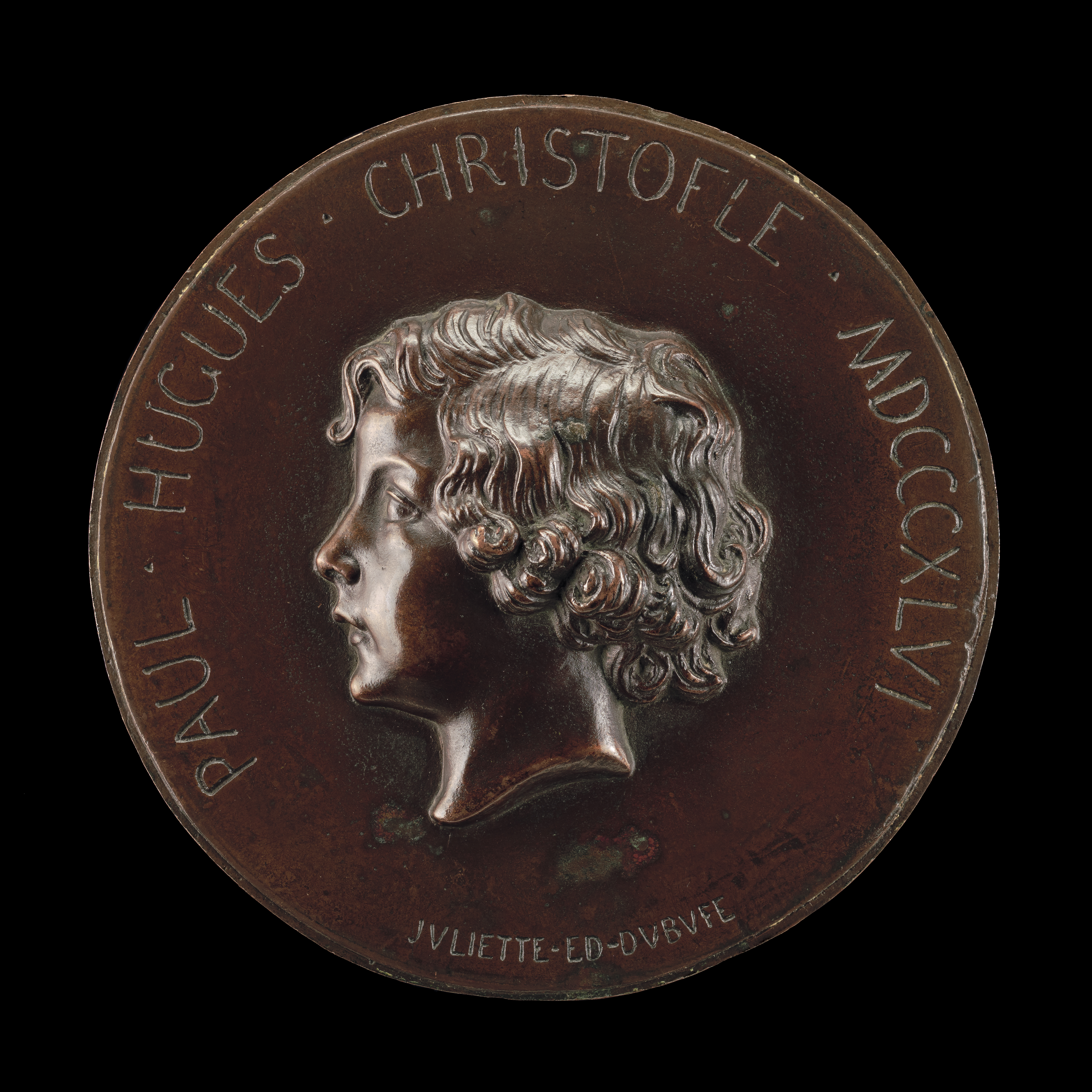
Paul Hugues Christofle, copper, 1846, in the collection of the National Gallery of Art

Juliette Dubufe (née Zimmerman) (1819 – 6 August 1855) was a French sculptor.

Wife of the painter Édouard Dubufe, Juliette was the elder sister of Anna, wife of composer Charles Gounod. They were the daughters of composer and piano instructor Pierre-Joseph-Guillaume Zimmerman. The Dubufes were the parents of painter Guillaume Dubufe. A pianist as well as a sculptor, Juliette exhibited a bust of Paul Delaroche at the Paris Salon of 1844. She died in childbirth at Auteuil.

A medal by Dubufe, Paul Hugues Christofle of 1846, is owned by the National Gallery of Art.
