= Benoît Chomel de Jarnieu =

French admiral (born 1955)

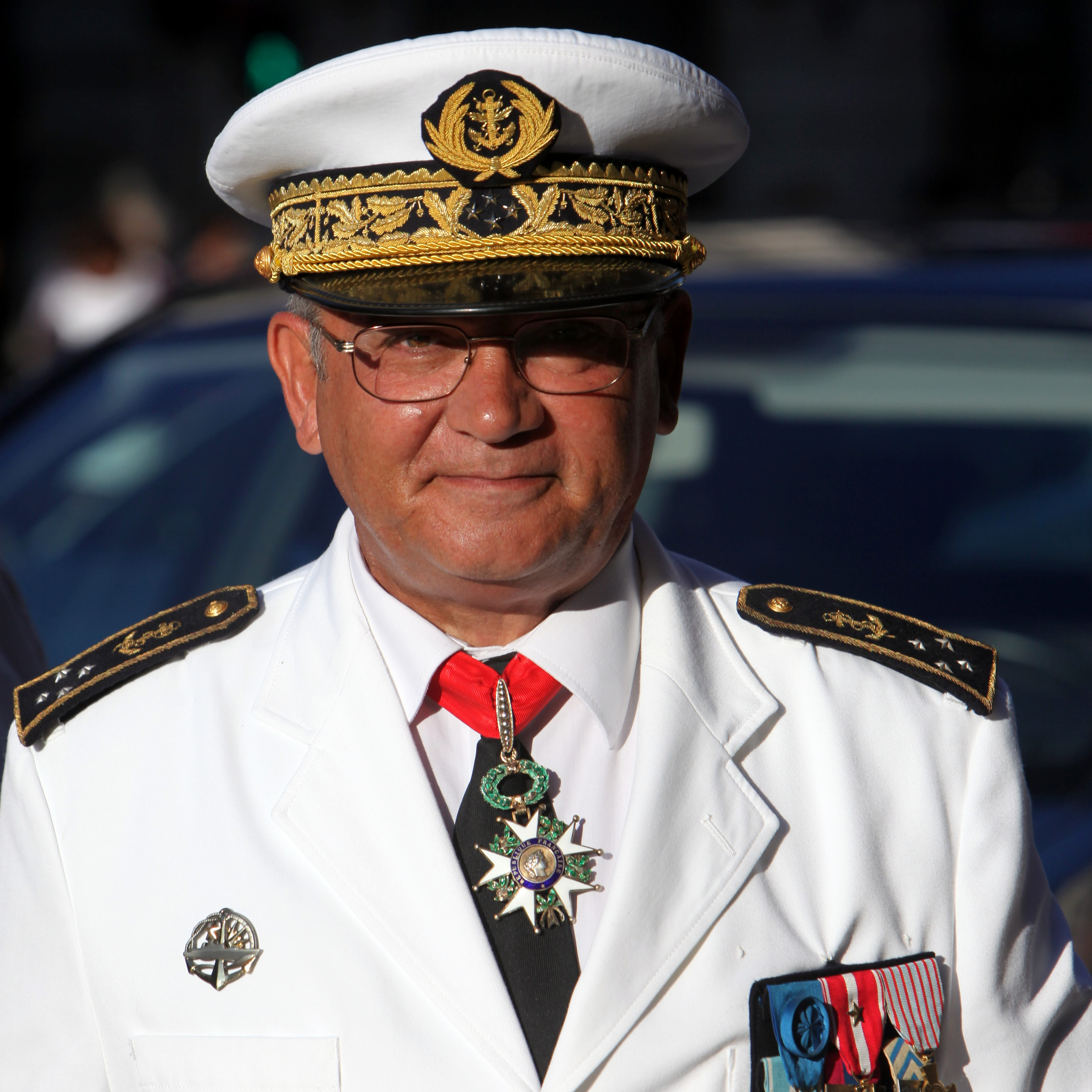
- Admiral Benoît Chomel de Jarnieu, major général of the French navy, at a ceremony in Toulon of the 14th of July 2011
- Born: 6 October 1955 (age 70); Saint-Mandé, France
- Allegiance: French Fifth Republic
- Branch: Navy
- Service years: 1975-present
- Rank: Admiral
- Commands: Aviso Premier maître l'Her , Jean Bart, La Motte-Picquet
- Awards: Officer of the Légion d'honneur

Benoît Chomel de Jarnieu (French pronunciation: [bənwa ʃomɛl də ʒaʁnjø]; born 6 October 1955 in Saint-Mandé) is a French admiral, currently major général of the Navy (n°2 of the Navy).
