= Hôtel de Ville, Saint-Mandé =

Town hall in Saint-Mandé, France

Hôtel de Ville
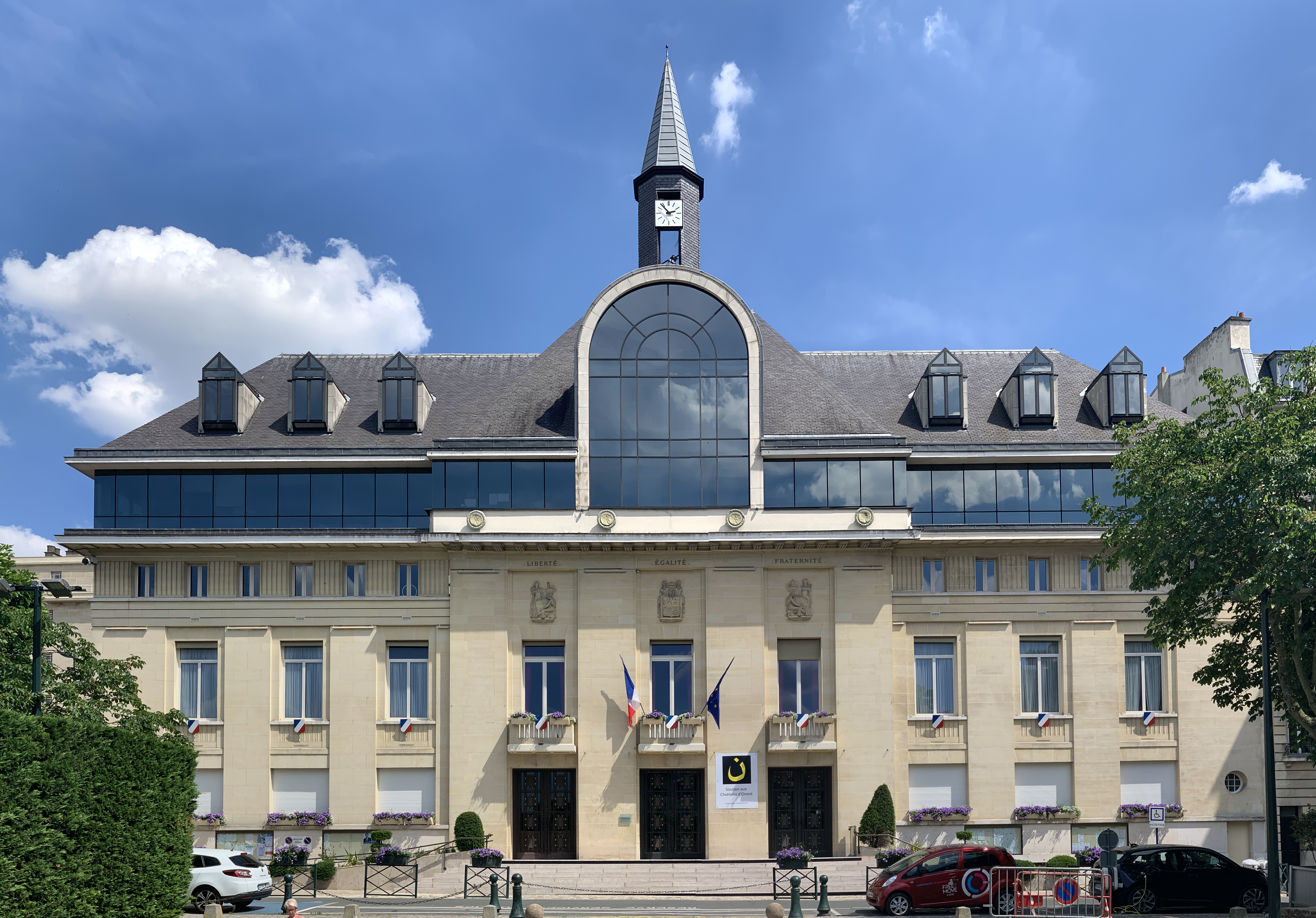
- The main frontage of the Hôtel de Ville in May 2020

General information
- Type: City hall
- Architectural style: Neoclassical style / Art Deco style
- Location: Saint-Mandé, France
- Coordinates: 48.8432°N 2.4191°E
- Completed: 1865 (re-fronted and extended 1935)

Design and construction
- Architects: Claude Naissant (1865) and Georges Forestier (1935)

The Hôtel de Ville (French pronunciation: [otɛl də vil], City Hall) is a municipal building in Saint-Mandé, Val-de-Marne, in the eastern suburbs of Paris, standing on Place Charles Digeon. It has been included on the Inventaire général des monuments by the French Ministry of Culture since 1991.

== History ==
The town hall before later modifications

Following the French Revolution, the new town council initially met in the Chapelle des Hospitaliers (Chapel of the Hospitaliers), which had been commissioned by Nicolas Fouquet as part of his residence, the Château de Saint-Mandé, in the 17th century. They briefly met in the home of the mayor, Edmé Gabriel Gendon, before moving to the guardhouse of the Porte du Bel-Air (Bel-Air Gate) in 1791. They continued to meet at the guardhouse for around four decades before relocating to a building on the Grand Rue in 1831.

In the early 1860s, the council led by the mayor, François Emmanuel Poirier, decided to commission a purpose-built town hall. The site the selected was on the east side of what is now Place Charles Digeon. The new building was designed by Claude Naissant in the neoclassical style, built by Denis Hippolyte Soudieux in ashlar stone, and was completed in 1865. The original design involved a symmetrical main frontage of three bays facing onto the square. The central bay contained a short flight of seps leading up to a panelled doorway with a canopy on the ground floor, and a casement window with a moulded surround on the first floor. The central bay was flanked by Corinthian order pilasters supporting an entablature and a stone panel with a segmental pediment. The outer bays were fenestrated in the same style except that the first-floor windows had triangular pediments. There were Corithian order pilasters at the outer edges of the outer bays as well.

Following the Saint-Mandé train accident of 26 July 1891, in which 43 people died, the bodies of the victims were laid out in the town hall so relatives could identify them.

The building was expanded to the rear, creating a Salle des Fêtes (ballroom) to a design by Alexandre Borgeaud and Paul Murcier, between 1902 and 1905. The room, which was 9.5 metres (31 ft) wide and 21 metres (69 ft) long, featured a parquet floor and was decorated with fine murals by the painter, Guillaume Dubufe, assisted by Édouard Rosset-Granger, between 1906 and 1909.

A war memorial, in the form of an obelisk with a statue of a soldier being watched by an angel, which was intended to commemorated the lives of local service personnel who had died in the First World War, was designed by Borgeaud and Holl and unveiled in the square in front of the town hall in 1923. The building was then re-fronted in an Art Deco style and extended to the north and south, to a design by Georges Forestier, in 1935.

On 18 August 1944, during the Second World War, the French Resistance arrived at the town hall, making it one of the first to be occupied by the local liberation committee. This was a week before the official liberation of the town by the French 2nd Armoured Division, commanded by General Philippe Leclerc, on 25 August 1944.

After a major fire on the first floor of the building in October 1989, which caused extensive damage, the building was restored and heightened with a glass-fronted attic and a round-headed glass pediment. After the work was completed, the building was officially re-opened by the Minister of the Interior and Regional Planning, Charles Pasqua, on 19 June 1995.
