= Christine Nougaret =

French archivist and historian (born 1958)

Christine Nougaret, née Christine Françoise Marguerite Chapalain, (born 23 November 1958 in Saint-Mandé) is a French archivist and historian.

After graduation from the École nationale des chartes in 1982, her career has led successively from the Archives municipales de Nantes where she served as curator from 1982 to 1991, to the Service interministériel des Archives de France, and the Archives nationales where she directed the CARAN—the private archives section, then the ancient section. She has also held the chair of History of Institutions, Diplomatic and Contemporary Archival Science at the École des chartes from 2007 to 2019.

An internationally recognized expert on finding aids, she contributed to the development of the ISAD(G) standard.

From 2016 to 2019, she has been vice-president of the Conseil supérieur des archives.

She was named Officier des Arts et des Lettres in 2013, and Chevalier de la Légion d’honneur in 2014.

She is married to Roger Nougaret.

== Publications ==
- Misère et assistance dans le pays de Rennes au XVIIIe siècle, Nantes, Cid-Éditions, 1989 ISBN 2-904633-27-8
- Les Instruments de recherche dans les archives, Paris, La Documentation française, 1999 (with Bruno Galland) ISBN 2-911601-13-0
- Archives et nations dans l'Europe du XIXe siècle, Paris, École nationale des chartes, 2004 (with Bruno Delmas) ISBN 2-900791-65-0
- Les Archives privées : manuel pratique et juridique, Paris, La Documentation française, 2008 (with Pascal Even) ISBN 978-2-11-006852-1
- L'Édition critique des textes contemporains, XIXe-XXe siècle, Paris, École nationale des chartes, 2015 (with Elisabeth Parinet) ISBN 978-2-35723-062-0
