= Pierre-Joseph-Guillaume Zimmerman =

French pianist

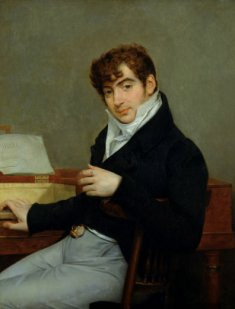
Zimmerman in a portrait by Antoine-Jean Gros, 1808

Pierre-Joseph-Guillaume Zimmerman (19 March 1785 – 29 October 1853), known as Pierre Zimmermann and Joseph Zimmermann, was a French pianist, composer, and music teacher.

== Biography ==
Zimmerman was born in Paris on March 19, 1785, as the son of a piano maker. He attended the Paris Conservatory in 1798, studying piano with François-Adrien Boieldieu; while a student there, he won first prizes for piano in 1800 (Friedrich Kalkbrenner came second) and harmony in 1802. He would later study under Luigi Cherubini. Zimmerman became a piano assistant at the Conservatory in 1811 and a full professor there in 1816, serving until 1848; he refused a position as a professor of counterpoint and fugue in 1821. Among his students were Charles Gounod (who married one of his daughters), Georges Bizet, César Franck, Charles-Valentin Alkan, Eugenie Santa Coloma Sourget, Ambroise Thomas, Louis Lacombe, Alexandre Goria and Lefébure-Wély. In 1842 he denied Conservatory admission to 13-year-old Louis Moreau Gottschalk without an audition on account of Gottschalk's American nationality, commenting that "America is a country of steam engines". Zimmerman was often assisted in his teaching by Gounod.

Zimmerman wrote two operas, L'enlèvement (Opéra-Comique, 1830) and Nausicaa (never staged). He also composed two piano concertos, one piano sonata, and numerous other works for piano. His most important legacy is considered his Encyclopédie du pianiste compositeur, a complete method of piano playing, including a treatise on harmony and counterpoint.

He died in Paris on October 29, 1853, at the age of 68, and is now buried in the Auteuil Cemetery in the 16th arrondissement.

One of his daughters, Juliette, married Édouard Dubufe.

== Sources ==
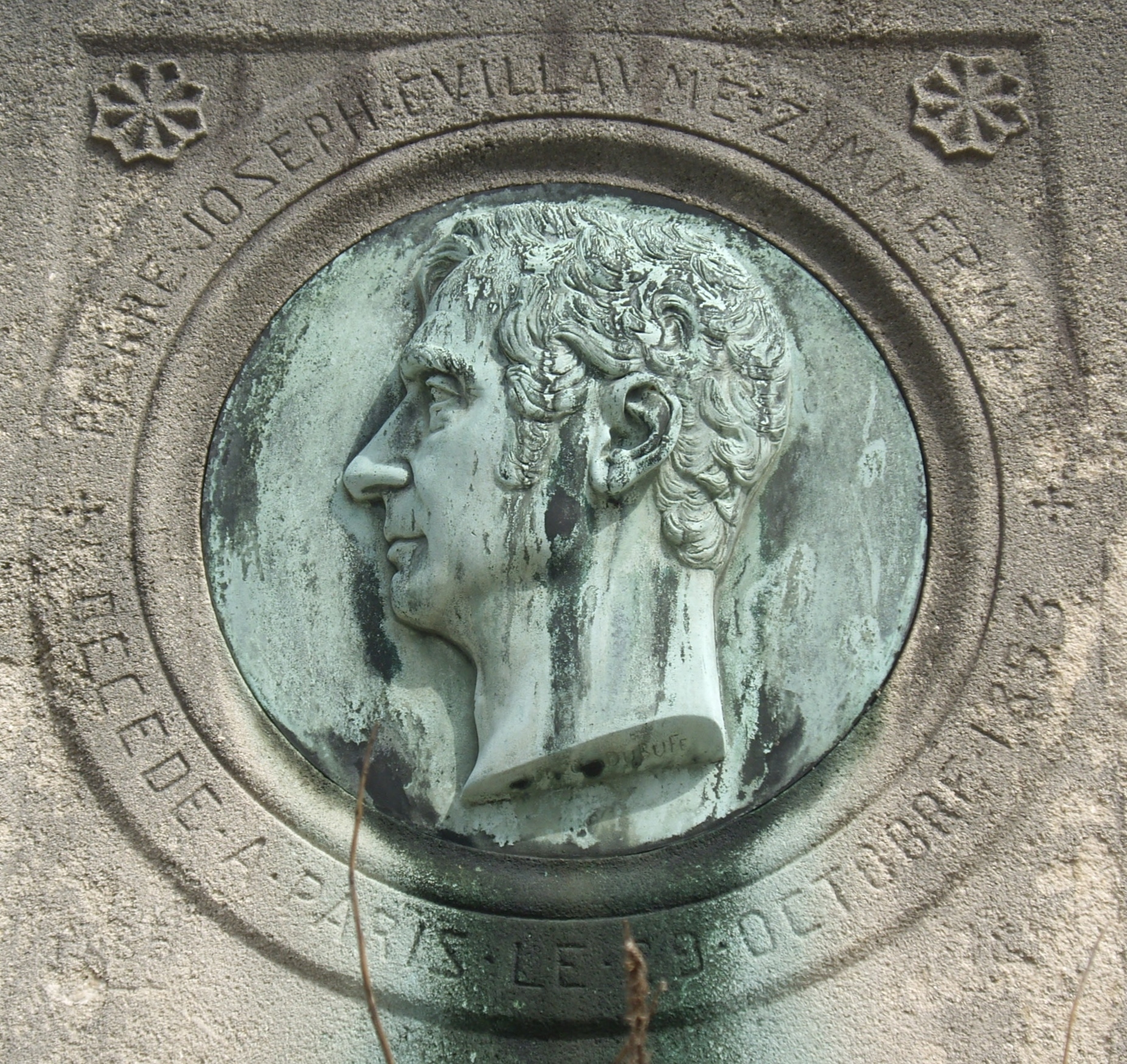
Grave in the Auteuil Cemetery

- Don Randel, The Harvard Biographical Dictionary of Music. Harvard, 1996, p. 1010–1011.
