= Lac de Saint-Mandé =

Lake in bois de Vincennes, Paris, France

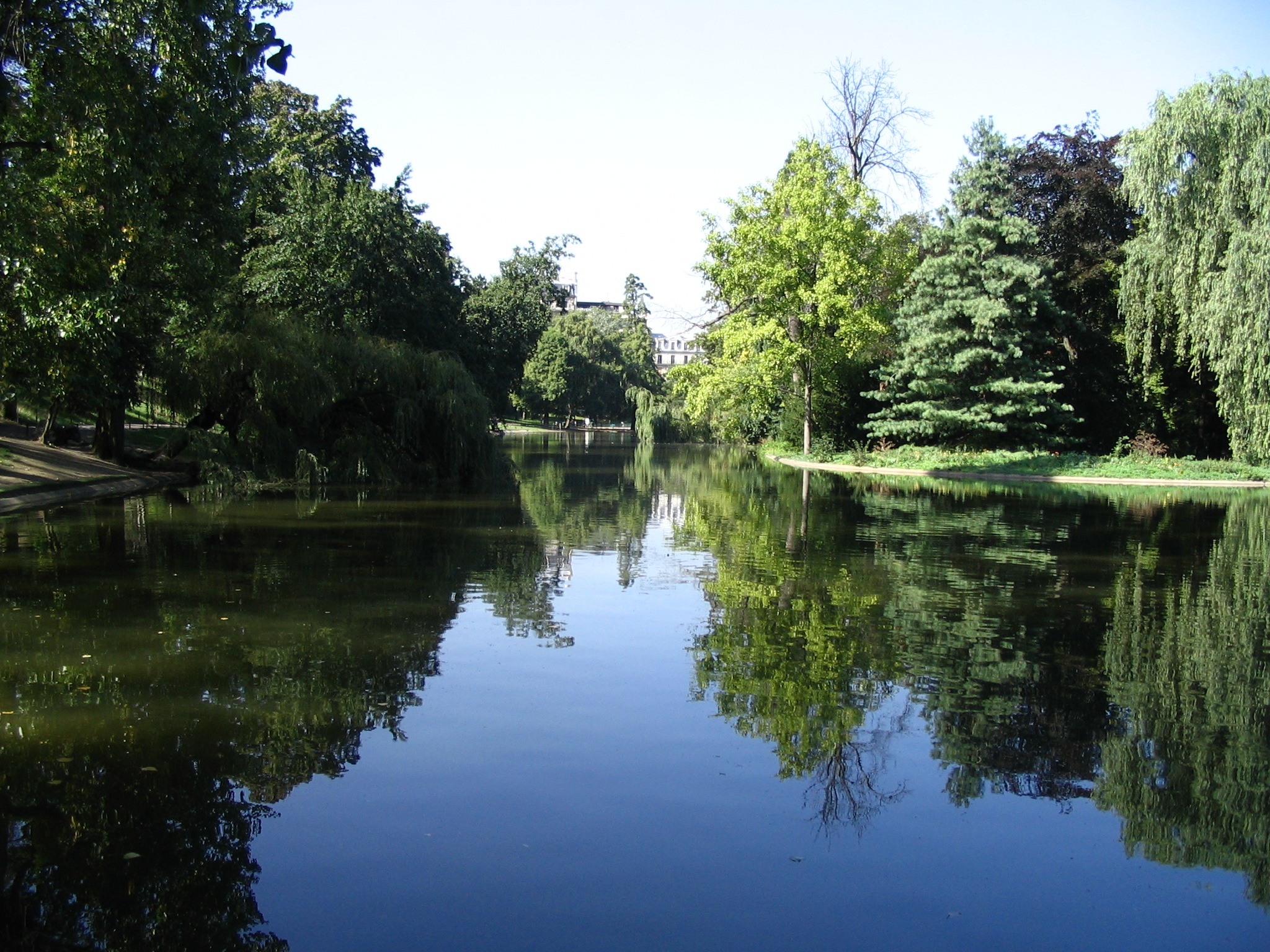

- Location within Paris
- Location: Paris
- Coordinates: 48°50′30″N 2°25′18″E
- Basin countries: France
- Max. length: 0.25 km (0.16 mi)
- Max. width: 0.1 km (0.062 mi)
- Surface area: 0.4 km^{2} (0.15 sq mi)
- Islands: 1

Lac de Saint-Mandé is a lake in the Bois de Vincennes (Paris, France). Its surface area is 0.4 km^{2} and it contains a small island.
