= Eugène Dauphin =

French painter

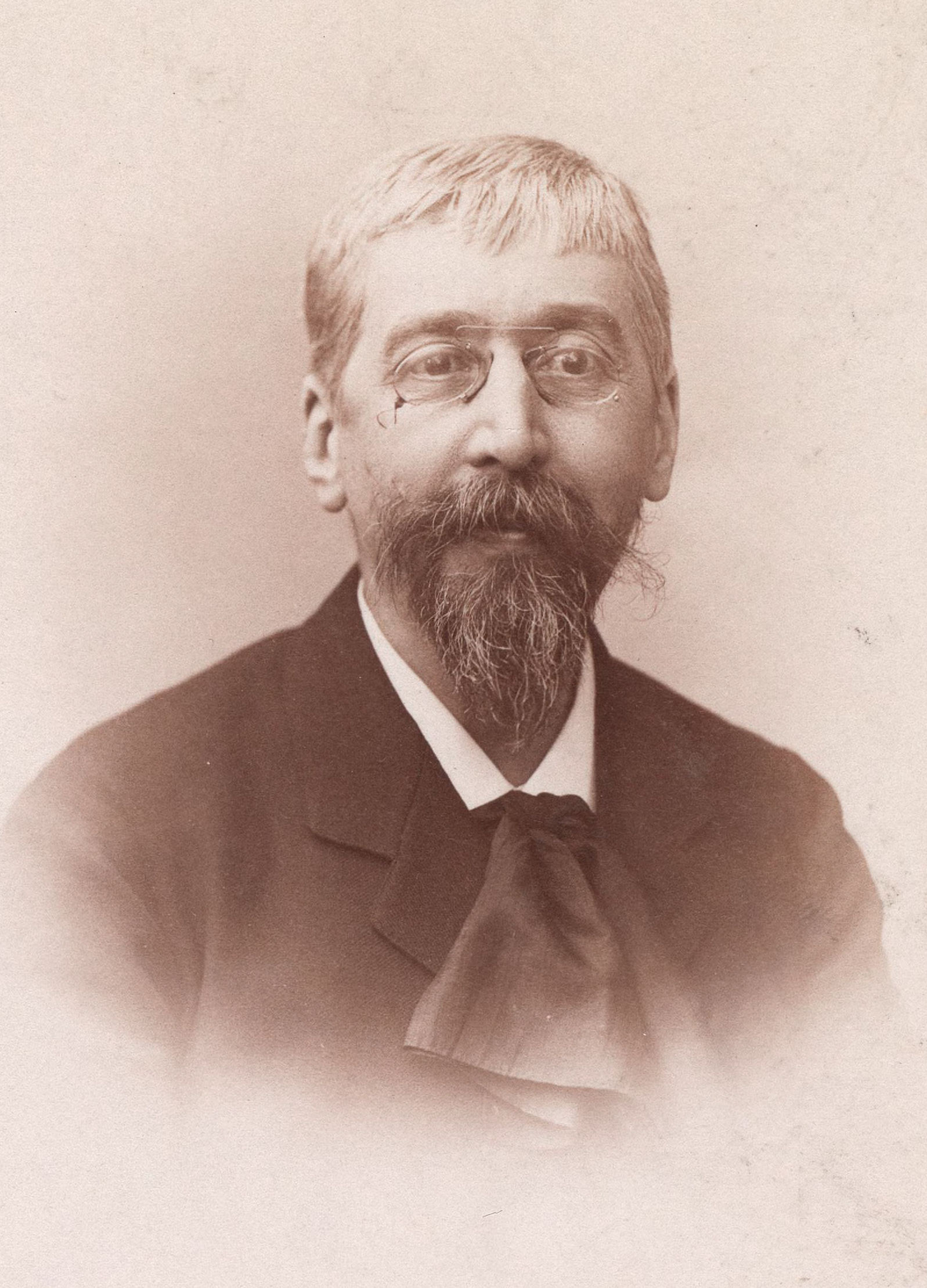
Eugène Dauphin; photograph by Nadar (before 1895)

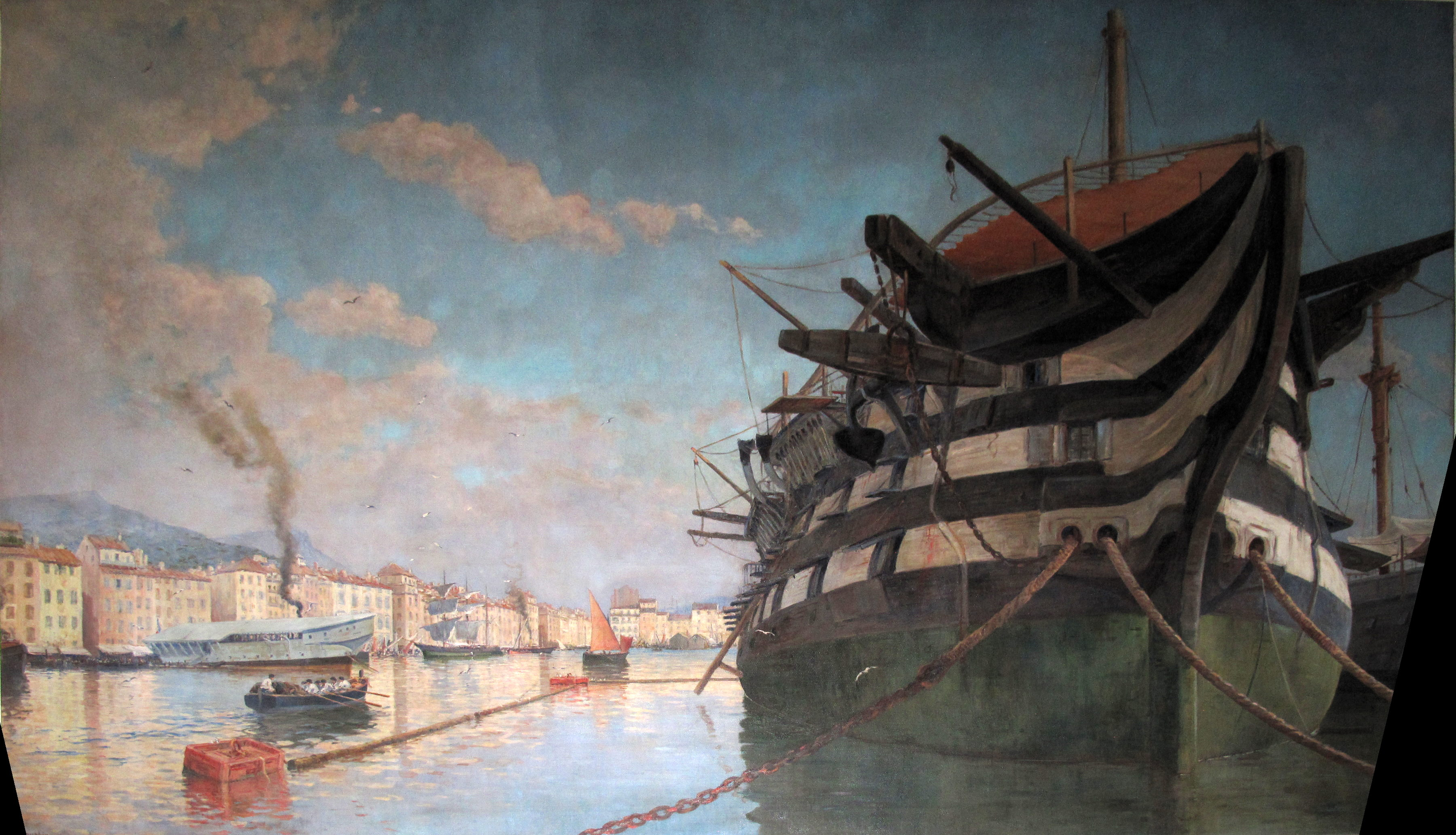
Toulon Harbor

Eugène-Baptiste Émile Marie Dauphin (30 November 1857 – 1930) was a French marine artist and landscape painter.

== Biography ==
He was born in Toulon, where his father, Étienne Dauphin, was an entrepreneur who developed properties along the Boulevard de Strasbourg. In 1878, he abandoned a preparatory course for the École centrale de Lyon, to pursue a career in art.

He attended the workshops of the "Atelier des Beaux-Arts de Toulon", where he studied with Vincent Courdouan. After that, he moved to Paris and continued his studies with Henri Gervex. His début came in 1880, at the "Salon des Artistes Français", followed by an exhibition at the Salon of the Société Nationale des Beaux-Arts, of which he later became a member.

He was named an official Peintre de la Marine in 1889 and was elected to the "Académie des Peintres de la Marine" in 1894. Shortly after, he paid an extended visit to Algeria. He was created a Knight in the Legion of Honor in 1895.

In 1900, he was one of numerous painters chosen to decorate the restaurant at the Gare de Lyon (now known as Le Train Bleu), creating a panel in the main hall, depicting Toulon. He also decorated the buffet at the Gare de Nice-Ville.

In 1922, a major decorating project was begun in the foyer at the Opéra de Toulon. Sixteen large canvases were commissioned from sixteen painters. Dauphin provided one, called Le Vaisseau Fantôme (The Ghost Ship), based on The Flying Dutchman by Richard Wagner.

Dauphin died in Paris in 1930.
