= Alexis-Joseph Mazerolle =

French painter

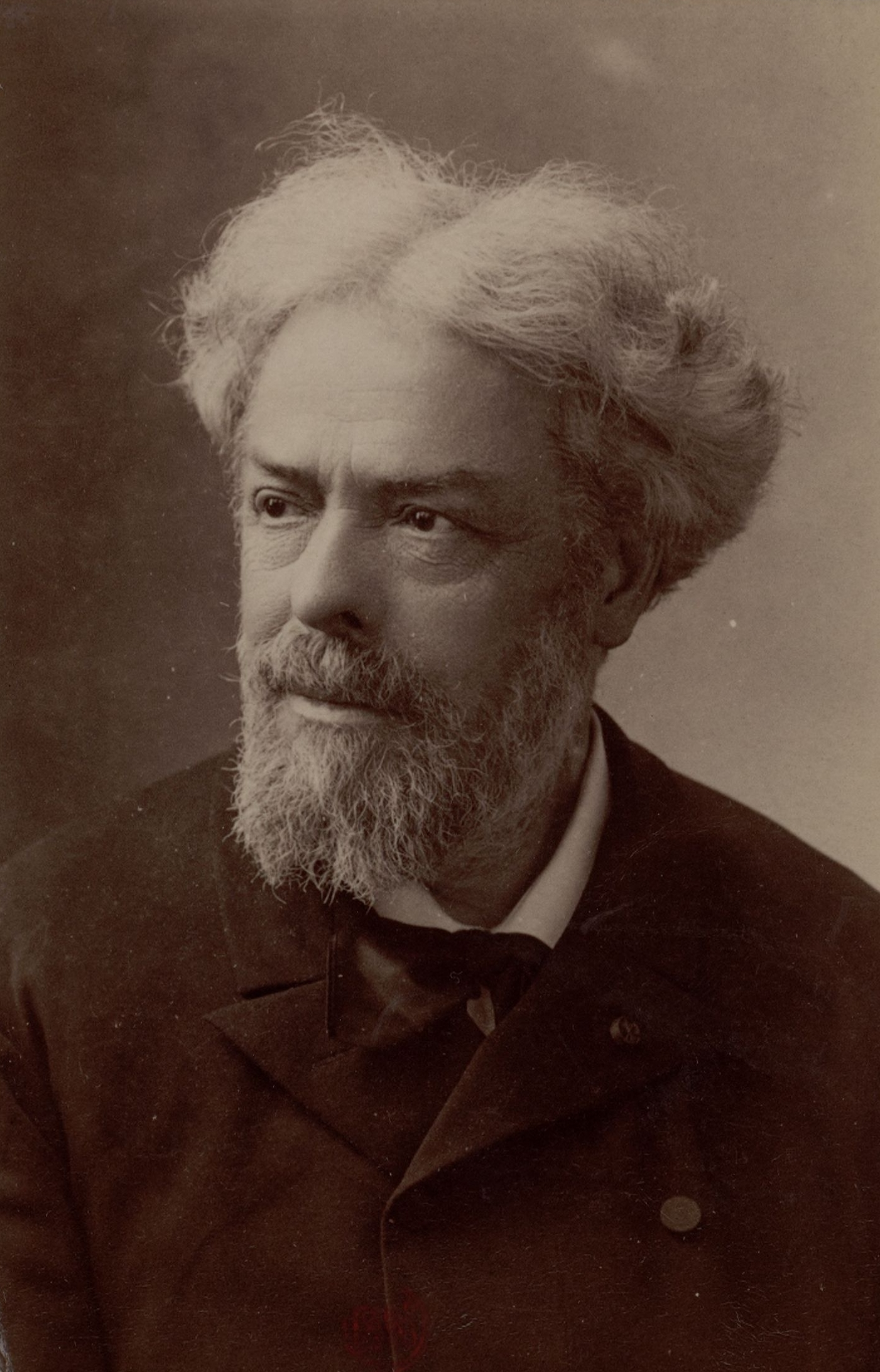
- Alexis-Joseph Mazerolle by Nadar (1910).
- Born: 29 June 1826; Paris, France
- Died: 29 May 1889 (aged 62); Paris, France
- Occupation: Painter

Alexis-Joseph Mazerolle (29 June 1826 – 29 May 1889) was a French painter.

== Life ==
Alexis-Joseph Mazerolle was born on 29 June 1826. His father, Jean-Baptiste, was a carpenter and his mother, Madeleine Vitry, was a laundress. He was their third child. He was admitted to the École des Arts et Métiers (School of Arts and Crafts), where he showed unusual ability in drawing. In 1843, at the age of 17, he was admitted to the École des Beaux-Arts where he was a pupil of Marc-Charles-Gabriel Gleyre. He also studied under Pierre Dupuis.

Mazerolle's first submission to the Salon was in 1857 with The Old Woman and the Two Servants. He continued to be a regular exhibitor in the Salon for most of his life. In 1857 he won a 3rd class medal for Chilperic and Fregigonde, and in 1859 won a "rappel" for Nero and Locusta Experimenting with Poisons upon a Slave. He won a second "rappel" in 1861. Most of his paintings were of historical or mythological subjects.

In 1861 Mazerolle married Aglaé Hourdou. They had two sons. He served in the National Guard during the Siege of Paris in 1870. He was awarded the Legion of Honour in 1870. In the early years of the French Third Republic Mazerolle created decorative tapestry designs for the Manufacture Nationale des Gobelins. In 1880 President Jules Grévy made him an officer of the Legion of Honour when the new ceiling of the Théâtre Français was inaugurated, for which he received much praise. He died on 29 May 1889 from an attack of asthma, aged 62.

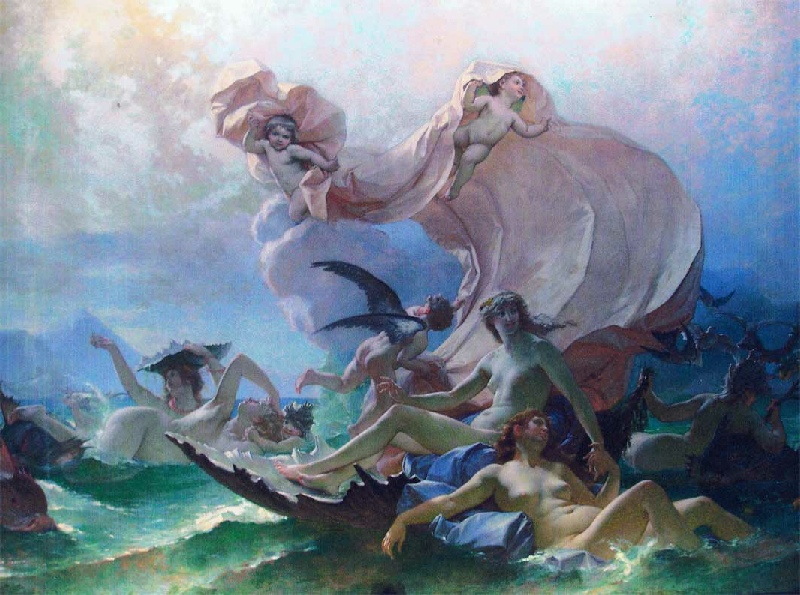
Venus marine (1882).

== Work in public collections ==
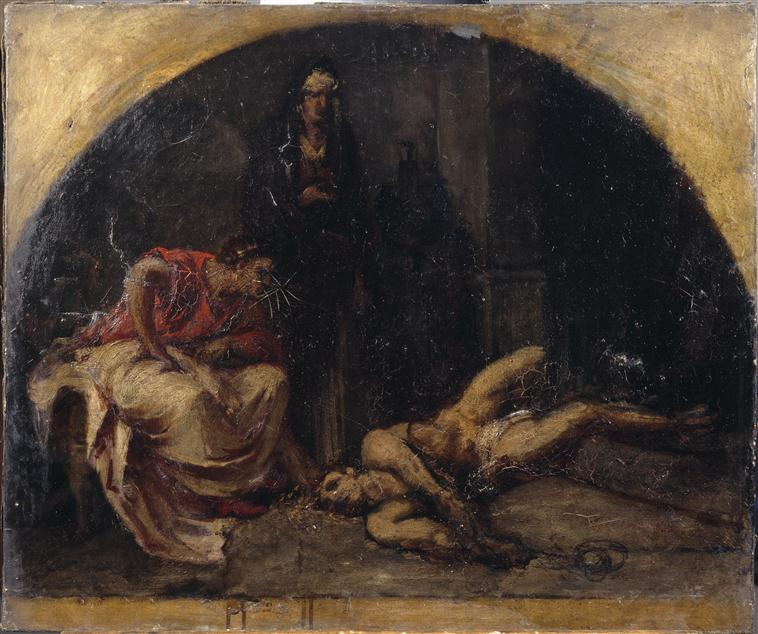
Nero and Locusta Experimenting with Poison on a Slave

Mazerolle is perhaps best known for his painting of Nero Experimenting with Poison on a Slave, held by the Palais des Beaux-Arts de Lille. He is also known for his ceiling paintings at the Comédie-Française and the Théâtre du Vaudeville in Paris, and for the Nine Muses and Six Geniuses for the Conservatoire de Paris. Works in public collections include:

- Petit Palais, Paris, Le triomphe de Bacchus
- Bibliothèque-musée de la Comédie-Française, Paris, La France couronnant Molière, Corneille et Racine, esquisse du plafond
- Palais Garnier, Paris, Le Café, Le Thé, La Pêche, La Pâtisserie, Les Glaces, Le Vin, Les Fruits, La Chasse (1873-1875), tapestries from the Manufacture des Gobelins for the rotunda of the Salon de Glacier
- Conservatoire de Paris, stage set
- Bourse de commerce de Paris, cupola
- Grand theater of Angers, foyer ceiling
- Palais des Beaux-Arts de Lille, Néron et Locuste essayant des poisons sur un esclave
- Musée départemental de l'Oise, Beauvais, cartons pour tapisserie Le Vin, Le Thé, Les Fruits, Le Sommeil d'Holophène, Adam et Ève, biblical frescoes from the villa Stoltz
- La Piscine Museum, Roubaix, Éponine suppliant Vespasien
- Musée Antoine Vivenel, Compiègne, Kiki Charlotte
- Musée des Beaux-Arts de Rouen, L'Opium
- Musée des Beaux-Arts de Strasbourg, portrait of his two sons Louis et Fernand
- Musée Condé, Chantilly, Oise, four decorative panels, Vases de fleurs
- Musée d'Angoulême, Angoulême
- Théâtre de Baden-Baden, Germany, cupola of the room
- Hermitage Museum, Saint Petersburg, Russia, tapestry La filleule des fées
- Mildred Lane Kemper Art Museum, St. Louis, US, Les Agapes
- National Fine Arts Museum, Buenos Aires, Argentina, Psyché à la source

== Sources ==
- "Biographie, Alexis-Joseph Mazerolle 1826-1889". L’Association des Amis du peintre Alexis-Joseph Mazerolle. Archived from the original on 2015-08-10.
- Campbell, Gordon (2006-11-09). The Grove Encyclopedia of Decorative Arts. Oxford University Press. ISBN 978-0-19-518948-3.
- Henninger, Joseph M. (2013-11-12). Drawing of the Hand. Courier Corporation. ISBN 978-0-486-77995-9.
- Spielmann, Marion Harry (1889). The Magazine of Art. Cassell, Petter & Gallpin.
- Stranahan, Clara Cornelia Harrison (1888). A History of French painting from its earliest to its latest practice: including an account of the French academy of painting, its salons, schools of instruction and regulations. Scribner. p. 441.
