= Saint-Mandé =

- Commune
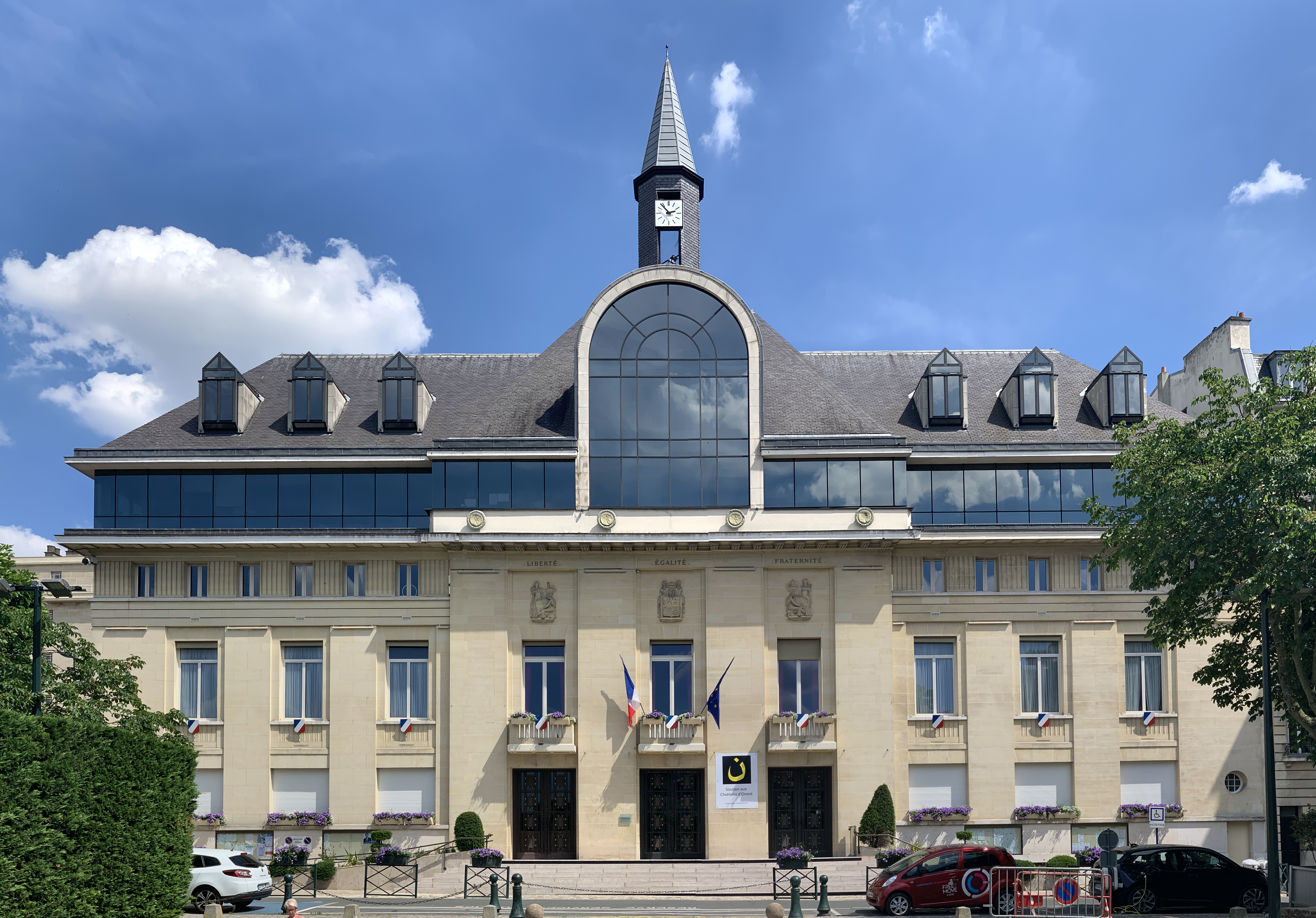
- The Hôtel de Ville

- Coat of arms

- Location (in red) within Paris inner suburbs
- Location of Saint-Mandé
- Location within France Location within Île-de-France (region)
- Coordinates: 48°50′32″N 2°25′07″E
- Country: France
- Region: Île-de-France
- Department: Val-de-Marne
- Arrondissement: Nogent-sur-Marne
- Canton: Vincennes
- Intercommunality: Grand Paris

Government
  - Mayor (2026–32): Julien Weil
- Area^{1}: 0.92 km^{2} (0.36 sq mi)
- Highest elevation: 54 m (177 ft)
- Lowest elevation: 42 m (138 ft)
- Population (2023): 21,071
  - Density: 23,000/km^{2} (59,000/sq mi)
- Demonym: Saint-Mandéens
- Time zone: UTC+01:00 (CET)
  - Summer (DST): UTC+02:00 (CEST)
- INSEE/Postal code: 94067 /94160
- Website: www.saintmande.fr
- ^{1} French Land Register data, which excludes lakes, ponds, glaciers > 1 km^{2} (0.386 sq mi or 247 acres) and river estuaries.

Saint-Mandé (French pronunciation: [sɛ̃ mɑ̃de]; named for Saint Maudez) is a commune in the Val-de-Marne department in Île-de-France. It is a high-end town in eastern inner suburbs of Paris, France. It is located 5.3 km (3.3 mi) from the centre of Paris.

Saint-Mandé is one of the smallest communes in Île-de-France by land area, but also one of the most densely populated municipalities in Europe. It is located on the edge of the 12th arrondissement of Paris, adjacent to the Bois de Vincennes, near the Porte de Vincennes and the Porte de Saint-Mandé.

The town motto is Cresco et Floresco, which means "I grow and I flourish" in Latin.

== History ==
On 1 January 1860, the city of Paris was enlarged by annexing neighbouring communes. On that occasion, about two-thirds of the commune of Saint-Mandé was annexed to the city and now forms the neighbourhoods of Bel-Air and Picpus in the 12th arrondissement of Paris. The Hôtel de Ville was completed in its original form in 1865.

In 1929, Saint-Mandé lost an additional one quarter of its territory when the city of Paris annexed the Bois de Vincennes, (Note: The Bois de Vincennes belongs today to the City of Paris, as a part of the 12th arrondissement of Paris.) a small part of which belonged to Saint-Mandé. The territorial losses of 1860 and 1929 left a rump of a commune and is what remains of Saint-Mandé today.

== Population ==
Historical population

Year	Pop.	±% p.a.
1793	474	—
1800	297	−6.46%
1806	370	+3.73%
1821	455	+1.39%
1831	1,700	+14.09%
1836	2,478	+7.83%
1841	2,474	−0.03%
1846	3,590	+7.73%
1851	3,857	+1.45%
1856	5,292	+6.53%
1861	2,883	−11.44%
1866	4,561	+9.61%
1872	6,388	+5.78%
1876	7,499	+4.09%
1881	9,398	+4.62%
1886	10,492	+2.23%
1891	11,329	+1.55%
1896	13,371	+3.37%
1901	15,726	+3.30%

Year	Pop.	±% p.a.
1906	17,714	+2.41%
1911	19,227	+1.65%
1921	20,012	+0.40%
1926	21,477	+1.42%
1931	21,257	−0.21%
1936	22,253	+0.92%
1946	23,061	+0.36%
1954	24,522	+0.77%
1962	24,325	−0.10%
1968	23,044	−0.90%
1975	20,968	−1.34%
1982	18,673	−1.64%
1990	18,684	+0.01%
1999	19,697	+0.59%
2007	22,737	+1.81%
2012	21,846	−0.80%
2017	22,619	+0.70%
2023	21,071	−1.17%

Source: EHESS and INSEE (1968–2023)

== Personalities ==
- Marie-Thérèse Fourneau (1924―2000), pianist
- Juliette Benzoni (1920–2016), novel writer
- Charles Berling (b. 1958), actor
- Françoise Blanchard (1954–2013), actress
- Maurice Boitel (1919–2007), painter
- Armand Carrel (1800–1836), political writer, who died there in a duel
- Gaëtan Charbonnier (b. 1988), footballer
- Claudette Colbert (1903–1996), actress
- Georges Courteline (1858–1929), writer and lampoonist
- Bruno Cremer (1929–2010), actor
- Alexandra David-Néel (1868–1969), explorer
- Frédéric Diefenthal (b. 1968), actor
- Juliette Drouet (1806–1883), mistress of Victor Hugo
- Grégory Fitoussi (b. 1976), actor
- Alfred Grévin (1827–1892), caricaturist, founder of Musée Grévin
- Benoît Chomel de Jarnieu (b. 1955), Naval Admiral
- Jacqueline Lamba Breton, (1910–1993) was a French painter and married (1934–1943) to André Breton
- Hermann Fol (1845–1892), zoologist, pioneer of embryology.
- Alice Guy-Blaché (1873–1968), pioneer of cinéma
- André Moynet (1921–1993), pilot and racing driver
- Paul Nicolas (1899–1959), footballer
- Christine Nougaret (b. 1958), archivist
- Charles Nungesser (1892–1927), aviator
- Guillaume Jonquieres, footballer
- Benoît Puga (b.1953), French Army General, Grand Chancellor of the National Order of the Legion of Honour and the National Order of Merit

== Transport ==
The municipality is crossed by a principal north–south axis, the Avenue du Général-de-Gaulle (formerly Rue de la République), and by an east–west axis, the Avenue de Paris (RN 34). Another important and historical street of the municipality is the Chaussée de l'Étang, which goes along the Bois de Vincennes. Saint-Mandé is served by the Saint-Mandé station of the line 1 of Paris’s metro. RATP buses include lines 46, 56, 86, and 325. The closest airport is Orly Airport, located about 17 km (11 mi) away.

== Economy ==
The commune has the head office of Ubisoft.

== Education ==
Schools include:

- Preschools/nurseries (maternelles): Paul Bert, Charles Digeon, La Tourelle, E.G. Tillion preschool
- Elementary schools: Paul Bert, Charles Digeon, E.G. Tillion elementary

Junior high school students are served by Ecole & Collège Decroly and Collège Jacques Offenbach.

The private school system Ensemble Scolaire St Michel de Picpus maintains a secondary campus in Saint-Mandé.

== Twin towns ==
Saint-Mandé is twinned with:

- Waltham Forest, London, United Kingdom since 21 April 1956
- Eschwege, Hesse, Germany since 23 September 1989
- Concord, Massachusetts, United States since 15 March 1997
- Tres Cantos, Community of Madrid, Spain since 12 March 2005
- Drogheda, Ireland since 9 September 2011
- Yanggu, Gangwon, South Korea since 12 October 2011
- Vila Verde, Braga, Portugal since 13 April 2013

== See also ==
- Communes of the Val-de-Marne department
