= Gare de Lyon stabbing =

2024 stabbing attack in Paris, France

- Location: Gare de Lyon, France
- Date: February 3, 2024; 7:35 AM –
- Attack type: Stabbing
- Weapons: Knife and Hammer
- Deaths: 0
- Injuries: 3
- No. of participants: 1

The Gare de Lyon stabbing was a stabbing in the Gare de Lyon train station in Paris, France on 3 February 2024.

== Attack ==
On 3 February 2024 at 7:35 AM a man in his 30s carrying a knife and a hammer went into the Gare de Lyon train station in Paris and attacked multiple people with the weapons he had on him. The attack injured two non-critically and one critically.

== Investigation ==
While the police were investigating the attack, on the same day they ruled out the possibility of the attack being terror-related.

=== Suspect ===
The person who did this is a 31-32 year old from Mali who had Italian identity documents on him, according to the La Parisien paper, he has been living in Italy legally since 2016. It was later found out that the man was suffering from mental illness as well.
