= Gare de Lyon =

Terminal railway station in Paris, France

Paris Gare de Lyon
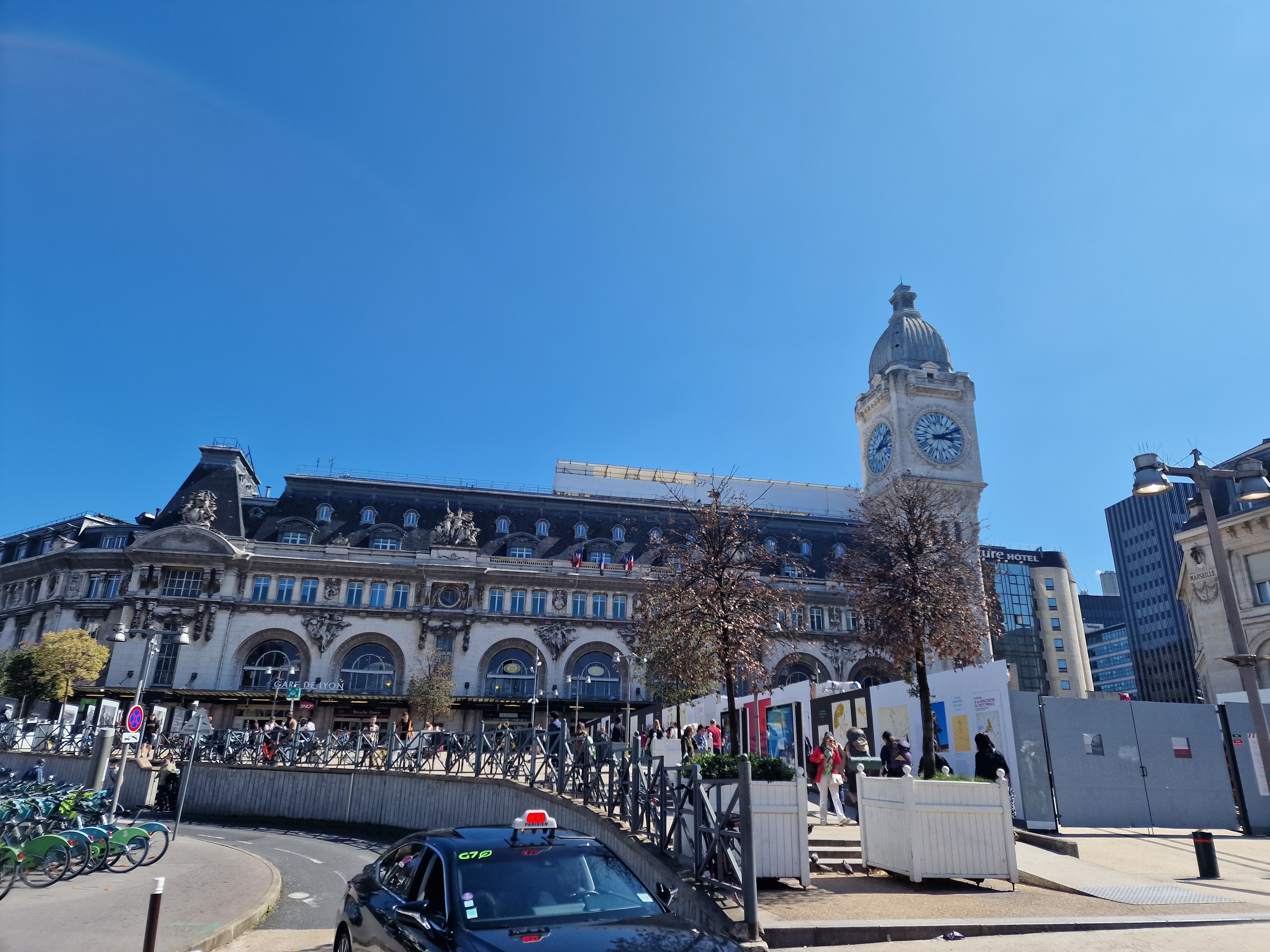
- The main facade

General information
- Location: 4 Place Louis Armand; Paris; France
- Coordinates: 48.8448°N 2.3735°E
- Elevation: 42 metres (138 ft)
- Operator: SNCF and RATP Group
- Line: Paris–Marseille railway
- Platforms: 13 (surface) / 1 (RER A) / 2 (RER D)
- Tracks: 22 (surface) / 2 (RER A) / 4 (RER D)
- Train operators: SNCF (TER, RER D), RATP (RER A), Trenitalia (Frecciarossa)
- Connections: Paris Metro Paris Metro Line 1 Paris Metro Line 14 Bus

Construction
- Parking: Yes
- Architect: Marius Toudoire

Other information
- Station code: 87686006
- Fare zone: 1

History
- Opened: 12 August 1849

Passengers
- 2024: 113,224,230
- Rank: 3rd busiest in France
Services
Preceding station	SNCF	Following station
Terminus	TGV inOui Paris–SE	Le Creusot TGV towards
Terminus	TGV inOui	Montbard towards Mulhouse-Ville
Terminus	TGV Lyria	Bourg-en-Bresse towards Lausanne
Terminus	TGV Lyria	Dijon-Ville towards Lausanne
Terminus	TGV Lyria	Dijon-Ville towards Zürich Hbf
Terminus	TGV Lyria	Mâcon-Loché TGV towards Genève-Cornavin
Terminus	TGV inOui	Lyon Saint-Exupéry towards Milan
Terminus	TGV inOui	Valence TGV towards Barcelona Sants
Preceding station	Ouigo	Following station
Terminus	Grande Vitesse	Lyon-Saint-Exupéry TGV towards Nice
Terminus	Grande Vitesse	Lyon-Saint-Exupéry TGV towards Bourg-Saint-Maurice
Terminus	Grande Vitesse	Avignon TGV towards Marseille
Terminus	Grande Vitesse	Valence TGV towards Montpellier
Preceding station	Trenitalia	Following station
Terminus	Frecciarossa	Lyon-Part-Dieu towards Milano Centrale or Lyon-Perrache
Preceding station	TER Bourgogne-Franche-Comté	Following station
Terminus	TER	Melun towards Laroche-Migennes
Preceding station	Transilien	Following station
Terminus	Line R	Melun towards Montargis or Montereau
Preceding station	RER	Following station
Châtelet–Les Halles towards Saint-Germain-en-Laye, Cergy-le-Haut or Poissy	RER A	Nation towards Boissy-Saint-Léger or Marne-la-Vallée–Chessy
Châtelet towards Creil	RER D	Maisons-Alfort–Alfortville towards Corbeil-Essonnes
Châtelet towards Goussainville	RER D	Maisons-Alfort–Alfortville towards Melun
Châtelet towards Villiers-le-Bel–Gonesse–Arnouville	RER D	Maisons-Alfort–Alfortville towards Melun
Connections to other stations
Preceding station	Paris Metro	Following station
Bastille towards La Défense	Line 1 transfer at Gare de Lyon	Reuilly–Diderot towards Château de Vincennes
Châtelet towards Saint-Denis–Pleyel	Line 14 transfer at Gare de Lyon	Bercy towards Aéroport d'Orly
Location

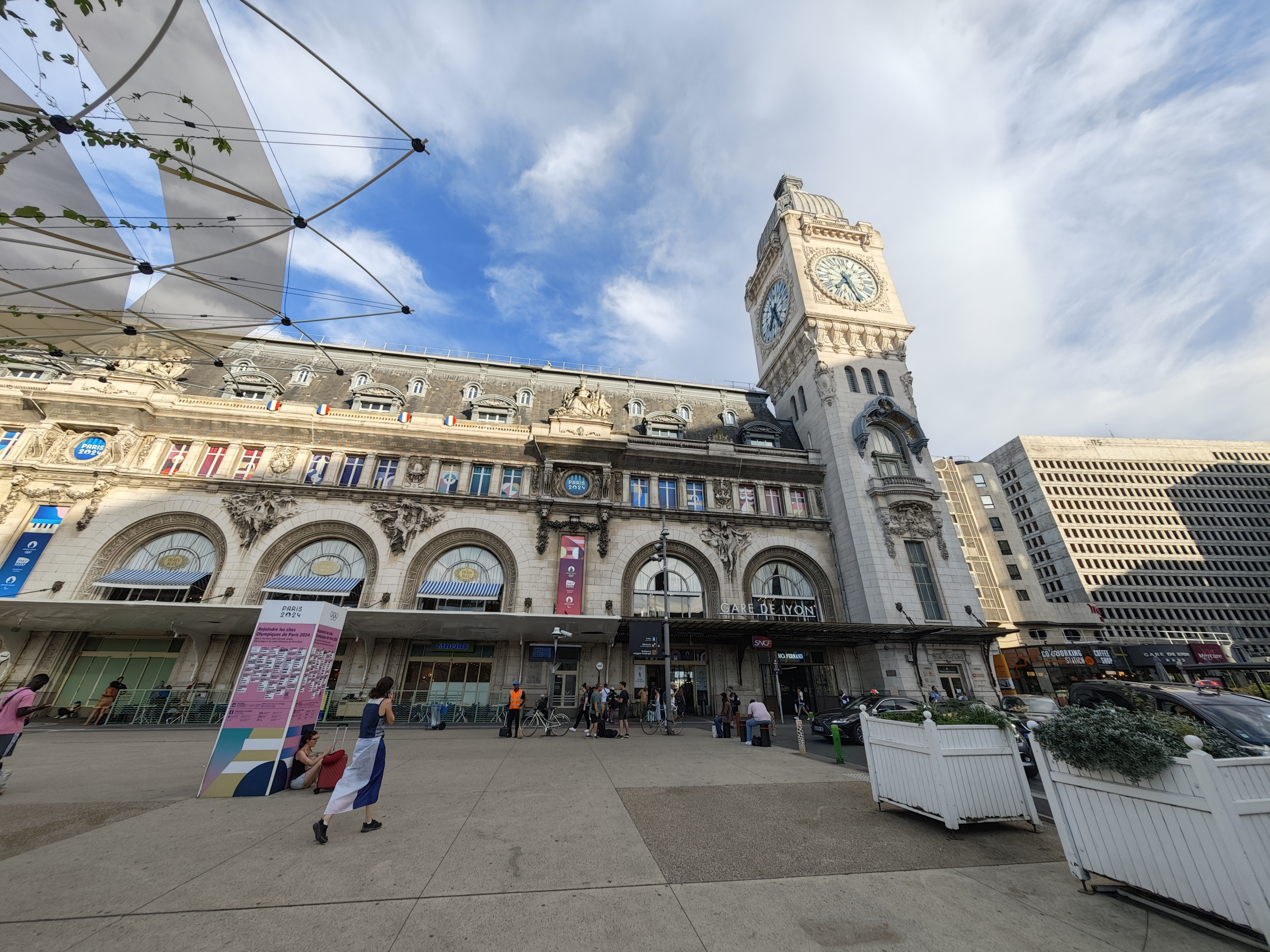
Main entrance and clock tower of Paris Gare de Lyon

The Gare de Lyon, officially Paris Gare de Lyon (French pronunciation: [paʁi ɡaʁ də ljɔ̃]), is one of the seven large mainline railway stations in Paris, France. It handles about 148.1 million passengers annually according to the estimates of the SNCF in 2018, with SNCF railways and the RER D accounting for around 110 million and the RER A accounting for 38 million, making it the second-busiest station of France after the Gare du Nord and just ahead of Gare Saint-Lazare; and one of the busiest in Europe.

The station is located in the 12th arrondissement, on the right bank of the river Seine, in the east of Paris. Opened in 1849, it is the northern terminus of the Paris–Marseille railway. It is named after the city of Lyon, a stop for many long-distance trains departing here, most en route to the South of France. The station is served by high-speed TGV trains to Southern and Eastern France, Switzerland, Germany, Italy and Spain. The station also hosts regional trains and the RER and also the Gare de Lyon Métro station.

Main line trains depart from 32 platforms in two distinct halls: Hall 1, which is the older train shed, contains tracks labelled with letters from A to N, while the modern addition of Hall 2 contains tracks which are numbered from 5 to 23. There are a further four platforms for the RER underneath the main lines.

== History ==
Lyon railway station had been under construction since 1847. It was officially opened to the public on 12 August 1849 under the name "Railway station from Paris to Montereau" (fr. Embarcadère de chemin de fer de Paris à Montereau). It was a boardwalk building designed by architect François-Alexis Cendrier under the direction of Baron Haussmann, and at the time of its construction it was awaiting arbitration between the French state and the first Compagnie des chemins de fer de Paris à Lyon et à la Méditerranée (PLM) company over its management. PLM did not like the fact that Mazas prison was being built next to the station. The company hoped that it could extend the railroad branch line to Place de la Bastille. But instead of that, Lyon Street (fr. Rue de Lyon) was laid out between the station and Place de la Bastille. The station was expanded many times as the volume of rail traffic increased.

As the station became unsuitable for further expansion, a second Gare de Lyon building was constructed in 1855 by the design of the architect François-Alexis Cendrier. The new building was operated by the newly established Paris à Lyon (PL) railway company. The station was built on a 6-to-8-metre (20 to 26 ft) high embankment to protect it from the floods of the Seine. It had only five tracks, occupying a large hall 220 metres (720 ft) long and 42 metres (138 ft) wide. A portico to the right of the entrance to the arrival hall connected the station itself to the Bâtiment X, the central administration building on the side facing Boulevard Mazas. The station was partially destroyed by fire during the Paris Commune in 1871 and later rebuilt.

On 8 July 1887, General Georges Boulanger's banishment from Paris triggered a demonstration: 8,000 people stormed the train station and covered the train with "Il reviendra" (He will return) posters and delayed its departure by an hour and a half.

By 1900, in time for the 1900 World's Fair, a new thirteen-track Gare de Lyon building was constructed, designed by the Toulon architect Marius Toudoire and decorated with a large fresco by the Marseille artist Jean-Baptiste Olive, depicting some of the cities to which one could take a train from this station. It was inaugurated on 6 April 1901 by Émile Loubet, president of the Third Republic.

On multiple levels, it is considered a classic example of the architecture of its time. Most notable is the large clock tower atop one corner of the station. The station houses the Le Train Bleu restaurant, which has served drinks and meals to travellers and other guests since 1901 in an ornately decorated setting.

On 27 June 1988, in the Gare de Lyon rail accident, a runaway train crashed into a stationary rush-hour train, killing 56 people and injuring a further 55. A fire broke out on 28 February 2020, that was reportedly started by Congolese protesters. The station was completely evacuated.

On 18 December 2021, the station became the terminus of the newly-inaugurated Milan–Paris Frecciarossa.

On 3 February 2024, a stabbing at the station injured 3 people.

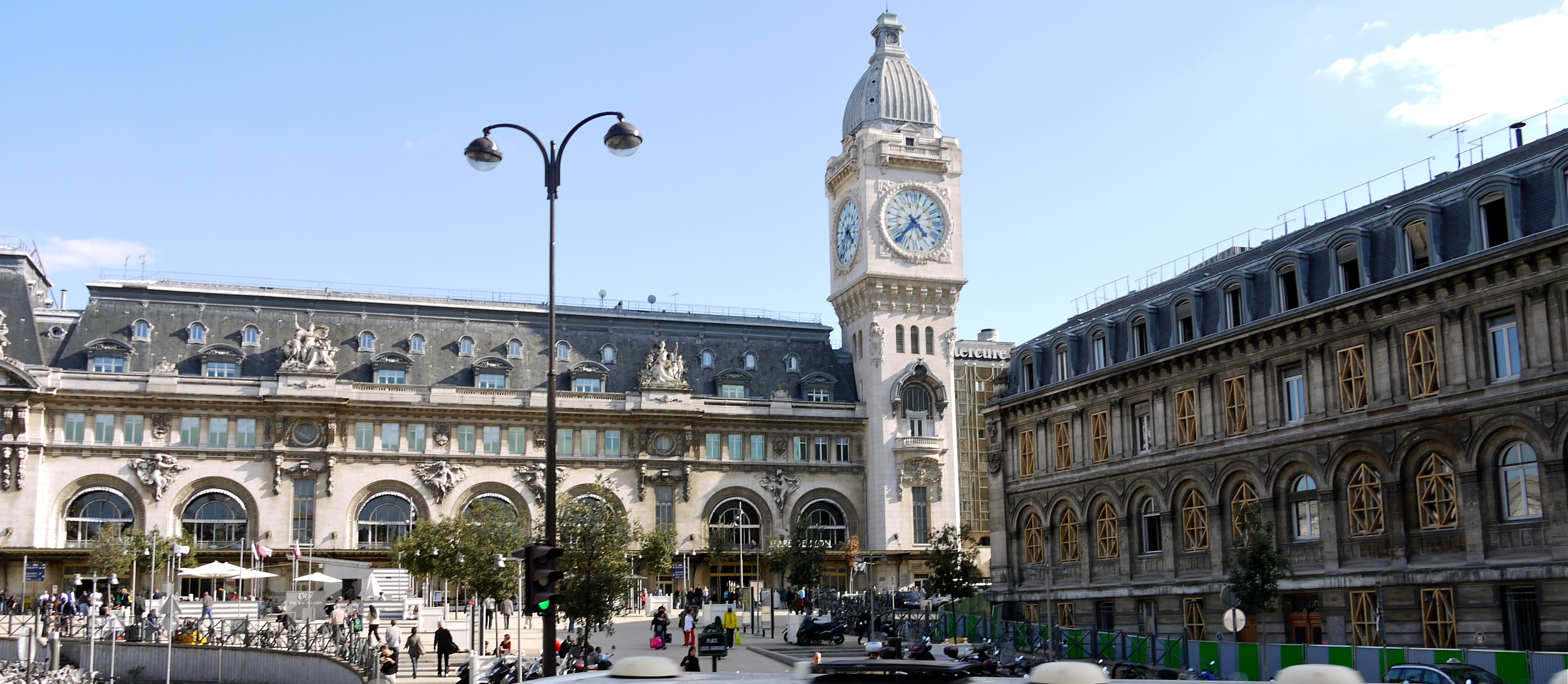
Outside the station, with its large clock tower

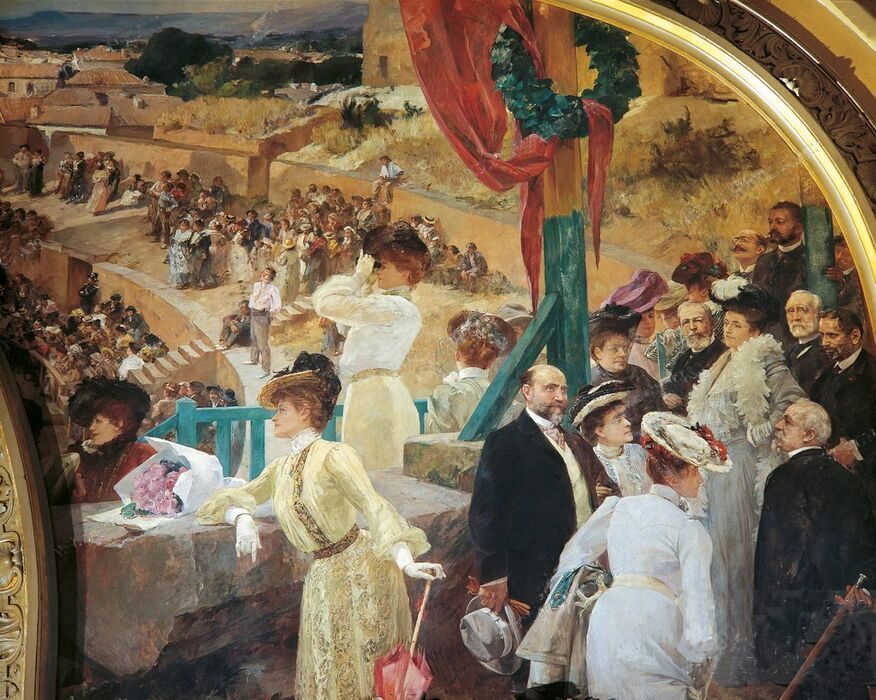
19th century wall painting by Albert Maignan inside the Le Train Bleu restaurant, in the main hall of Paris-Lyon station

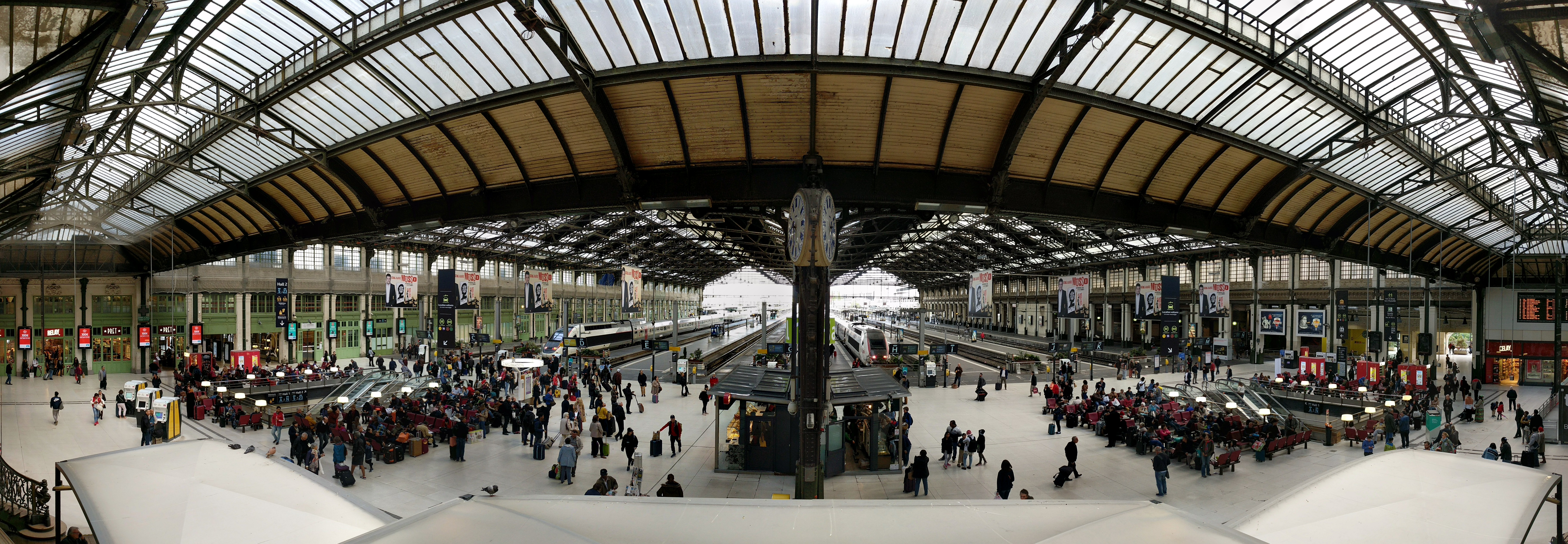
Inside the station's Hall 1

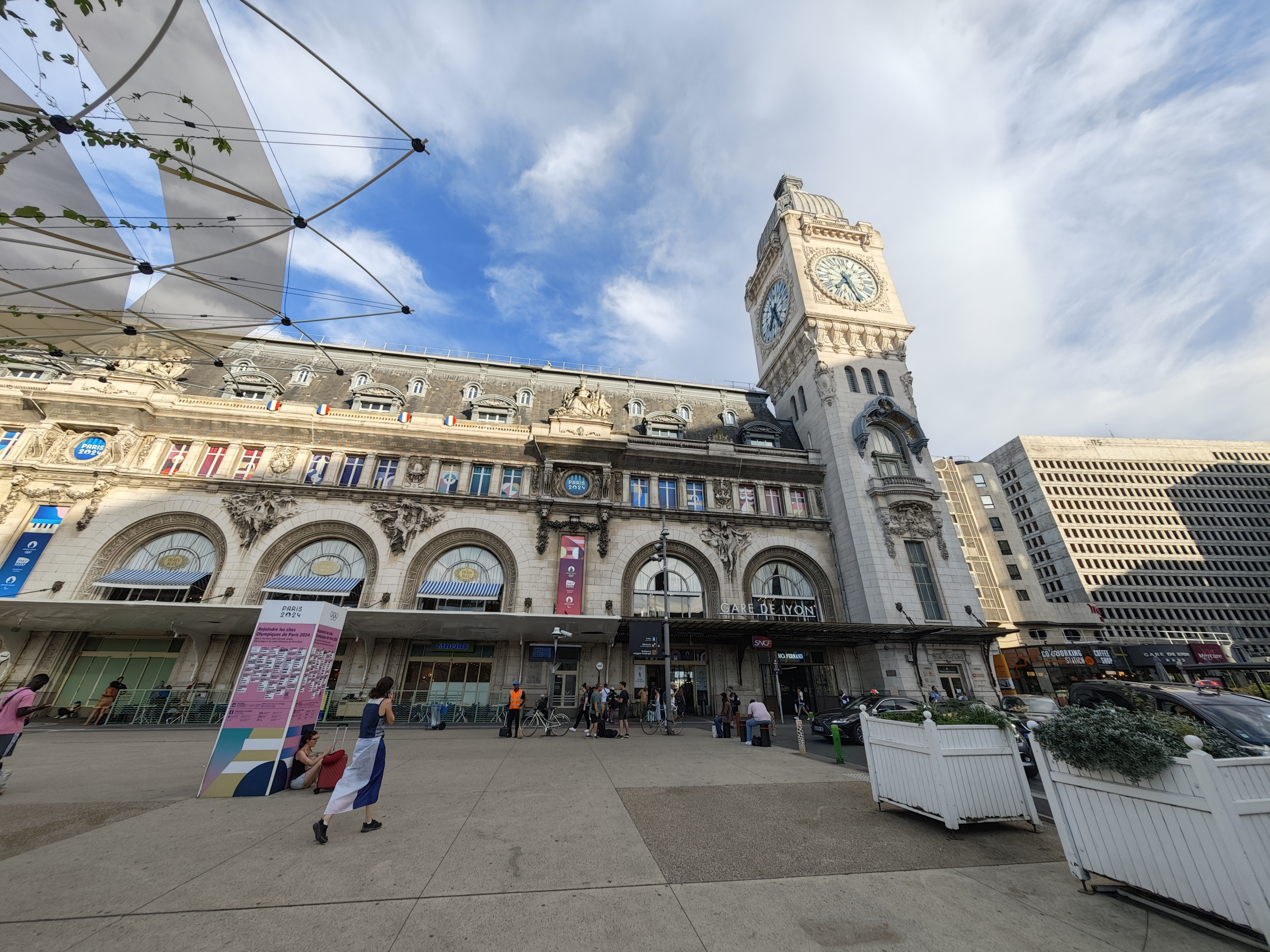

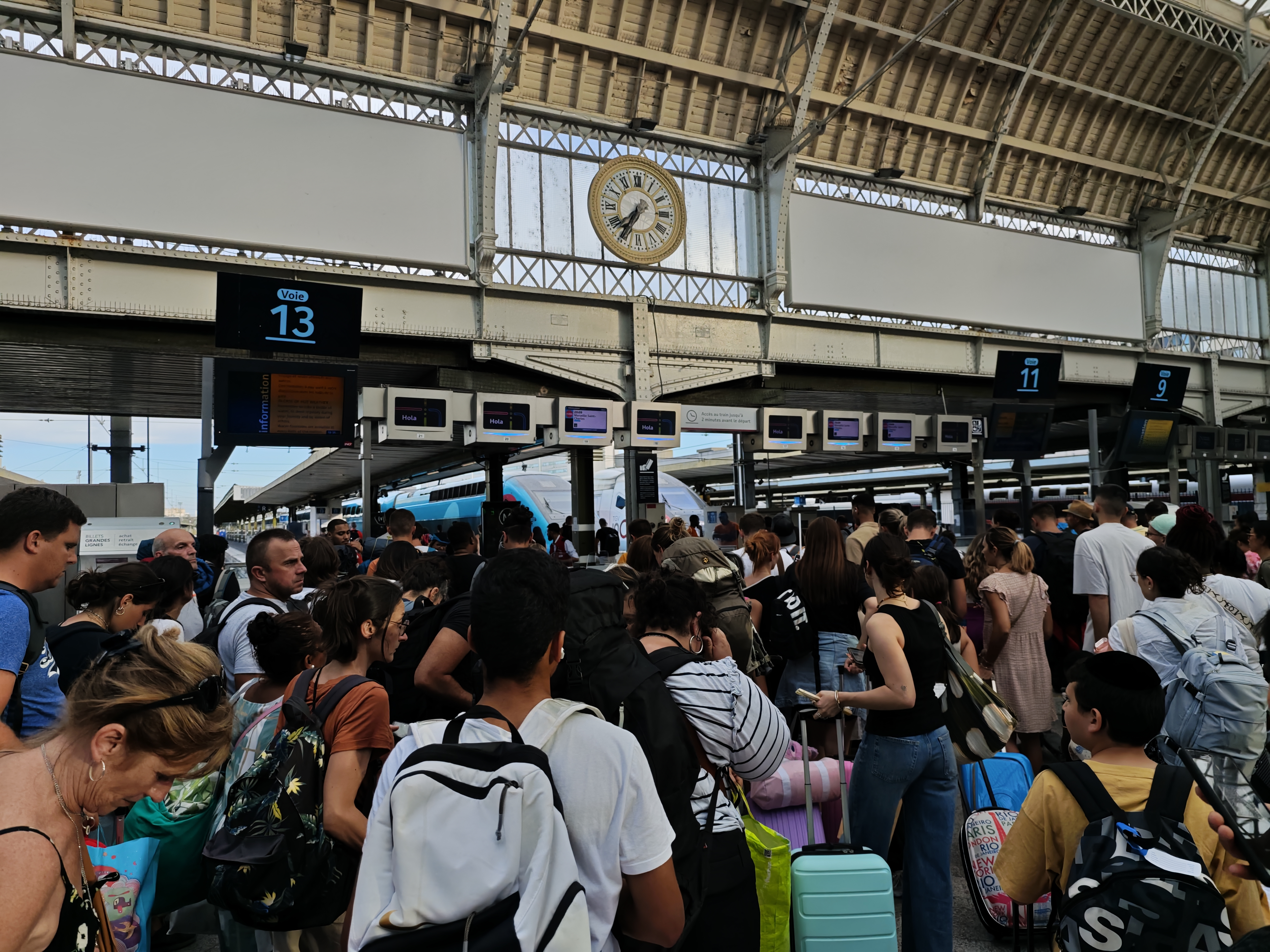
Passengers crowding the platform while boarding a Ouigo high-speed train

== Train services ==
From Gare de Lyon train services depart to major French cities such as: Lyon, Marseille, Nice, Montpellier, Perpignan, Dijon, Besançon, Mulhouse, Grenoble and a number of destinations in the French Alps. International services operate to Italy: Turin and Milan; Switzerland: Geneva, Zürich, Basel and Lausanne; and Spain: Barcelona.

The following services currently call at Gare de Lyon:

- High speed services (TGV)
  - Paris–Lyon
  - Paris–Avignon–Marseille
  - Paris–Avignon–Toulon–Cannes–Nice
  - Paris–Lyon–Montpellier–Béziers–Narbonne–Perpignan
  - Paris–Lyon–Montpellier–Perpignan–Girona–Barcelona
  - Paris–Grenoble
  - Paris–Bellegarde–Annemasse–Evian-les-Bains
  - Paris–Lyon–Chambéry–Turin–Milan
  - Paris–Chambéry–Aix-les-Bains–Annecy
  - Paris–Dijon–Besançon–Belfort–Mulhouse
  - Paris–Dijon–Besançon-Viotte
  - Paris–Dijon–Chalon-sur-Saône
  - Paris–Lyon–Saint-Étienne
  - Paris–Valence–Avignon–Miramas
  - Paris–Chambéry–Albertville–Bourg-Saint-Maurice (winter)
- High speed services (Milan–Paris Frecciarossa)
  - Paris–Lyon–Chambéry–Modane–Turin–Milan
  - Paris–Lyon-Part-Dieu–Lyon-Perrache
- High speed services (TGV Lyria)
  - Paris–Bellegarde–Geneva (–Lausanne)
  - Paris–Belfort–Mulhouse–Basel (–Zurich)
  - Paris–Dijon–Lausanne
- Regional services Paris–Montereau–Sens–Laroche-Migennes
- Regional services (Transilien) Paris–Melun–Moret–Nemours–Montargis
- Paris RER services A
  - Saint-Germain-en-Laye–Nanterre-Universite–La Defense–Gare de Lyon–Vincennes–Boissy-Saint-Leger
  - Cergy le Haut–Conflans–Sartrouville–La Defense–Gare de Lyon–Vincennes–Val-de-Fontenay–Marne-la-Vallee (Disneyland)
  - Poissy–Sartrouville–La Defense–Gare de Lyon–Vincennes–Val-de-Fontenay–Marne-la-Vallee (Disneyland)
- Paris RER services D
  - Creil–Orry-la-Ville–Goussainville–Saint Denis–Gare du Nord–Gare de Lyon–Combs-la-Ville–Melun
  - Goussainville–Saint Denis–Gare du Nord–Gare de Lyon–Juvisy–Ris–Corbeil
  - Châtelet–Gare de Lyon–Juvisy–Grigny–Corbeil–Malesherbes
  - Gare de Lyon–Juvisy–Grigny–Corbeil–Melun

== In films ==
The station has appeared in the following films:

- 1972: Travels with My Aunt, directed by George Cukor
- 1988: L'étudiante, Starring Sophie Marceau
- 2005: The Mystery of the Blue Train, an Hercule Poirot mystery novel by Agatha Christie (and its TV adaptation)
- 2007: Mr. Bean's Holiday, directed by Steve Bendelack
- 2010: The Tourist, directed by Florian Henckel von Donnersmarck

== See also ==
- List of Paris railway stations
- List of Réseau Express Régional stations
- List of Paris Métro stations
- Grande fresque de la gare de Lyon
