= Grande fresque de la gare de Lyon =

Large mural in the Gare de Lyon, Paris

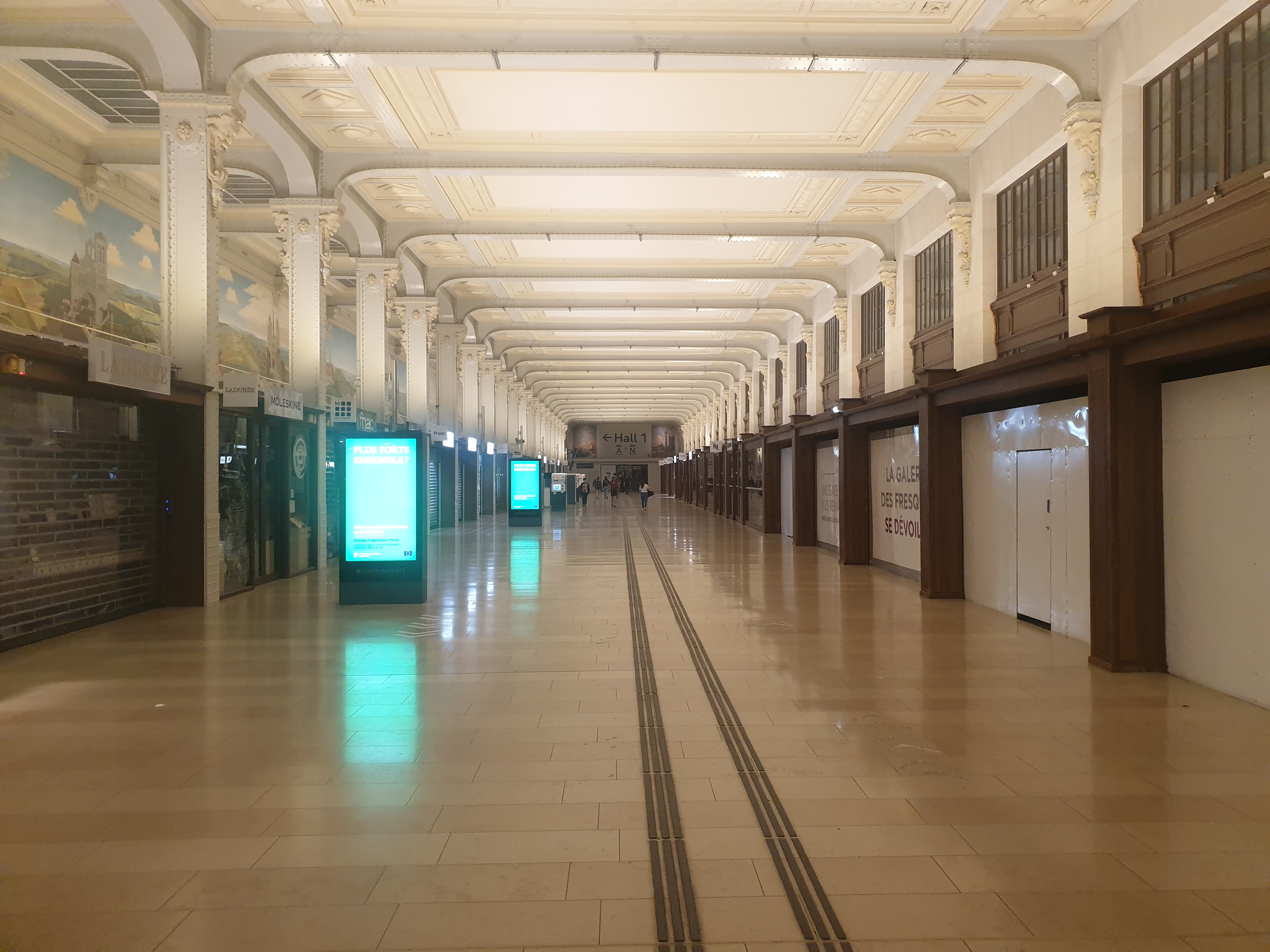
The ticketing hall of the gare de Lyon. The mural can be seen on the left of the photo.

The grande fresque de la gare de Lyon is a long mural located in the gare de Lyon, a railway station in the 12th arrondissement of Paris that depicts 20 of the major cities and sites (including Paris) that can be accessed via the Paris-Menton rail line. The mural was painted in three stages spanning eight decades. In 1900, Jean-Baptiste Olive completed the panels for six Mediterranean cities, and, in 1920 and 1930, the Lyon-Marseille segment was added. As part of a major renovation completed in 1980, Jean-Paul Letellier delivered the panels relating to the Paris-Lyon section.

== Location ==
The mural occupies the entire upper level of a wall in the ticketing hall of the gare de Lyon. This hall, which is crossed by 100,000 travellers per day, is also known as the "fresco gallery" (galerie des fresques) or the "hall of lost steps" (salle des pas perdus). It begins at the northwest corner of the station from Hall 1 and continues towards the southeast to reach Hall 2.

With a length of 100 meters, the mural is mounted on the hall’s southwest wall, which runs along Concourse 1 of the historic main rail station (Hall 1). It is bordered on either side by shops, by ticket sales counters, and by the frequent traveler lounge.

== History ==
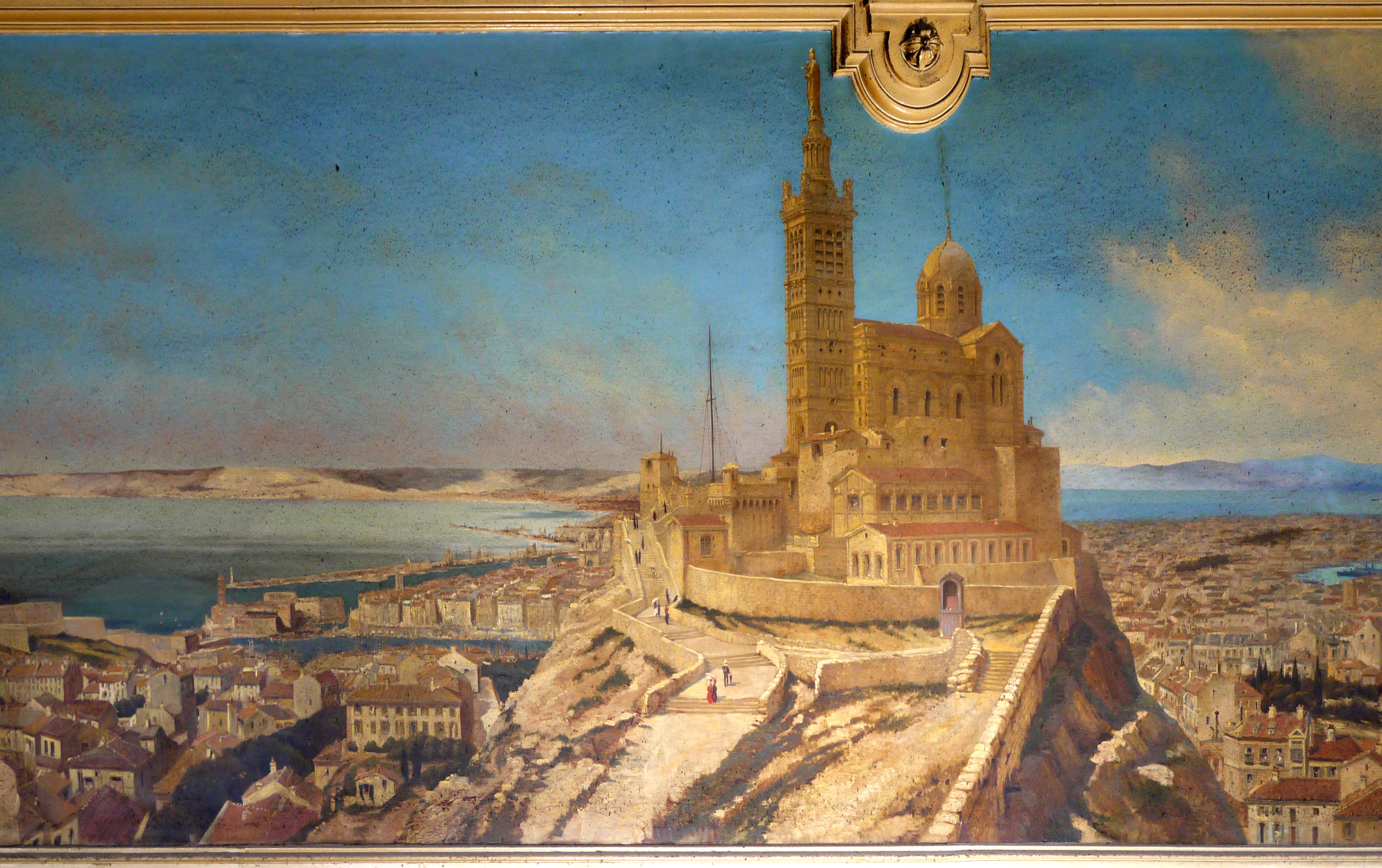
The Marseille section of the mural

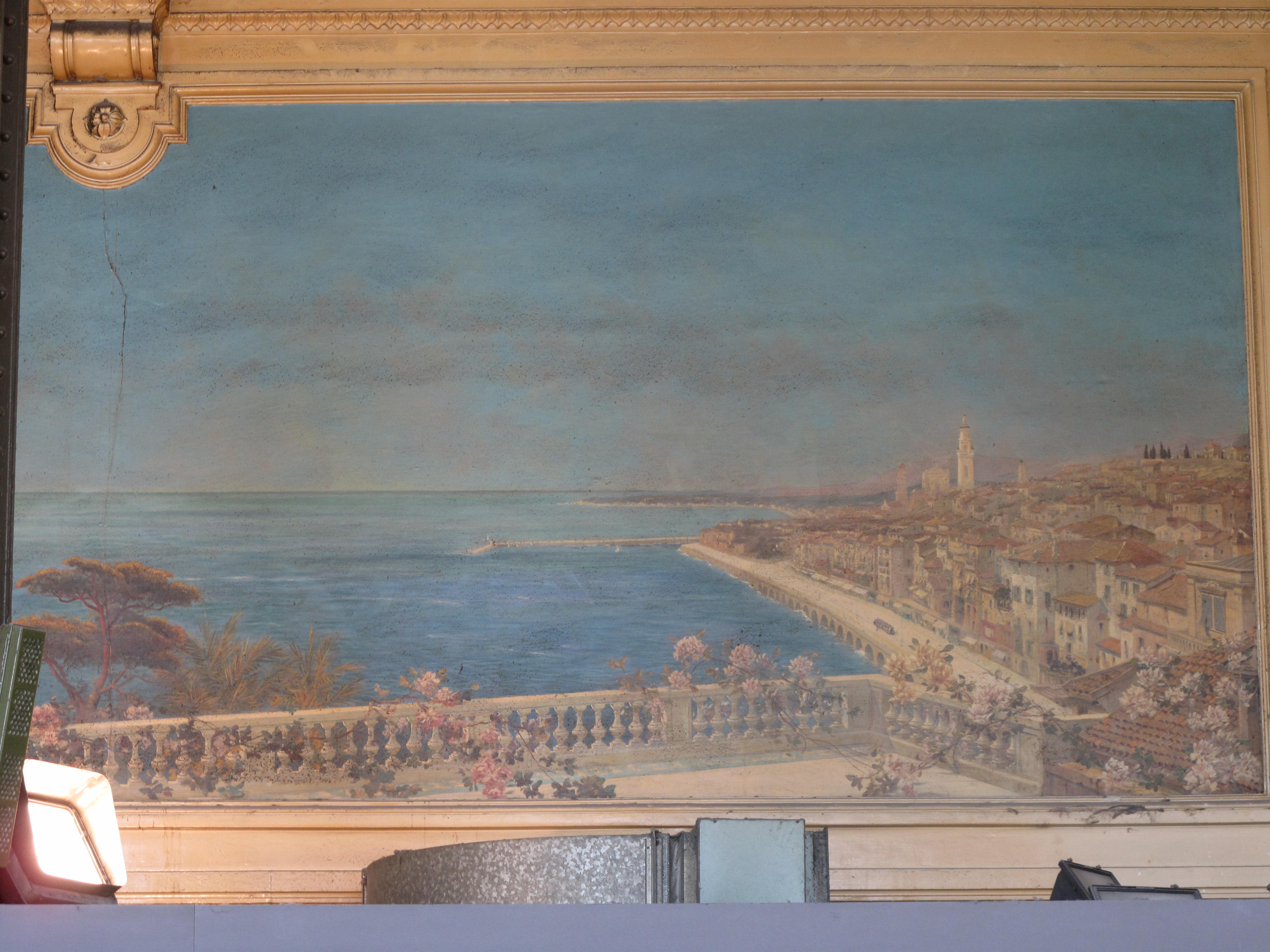
Menton, the final image in the mural and the end point of the PLM line

The mural was developed in three stages over a period of 80 years. The first stage represented 6 Mediterranean cities in 6 panels that were executed by the Marseillais painter, Jean-Baptiste Olive. The work was commissioned as part of the renovation of the station in preparation for the Exposition Universelle of 1900 by the Compagnie des chemins de fer de Paris à Lyon et à la Méditerranée (usually abbreviated as "Paris-Lyon-Méditerranée", or simply PLM). The architect Marius Toudoire proposed that the mural be created to liven up what was originally a non-descript transit area of the train station. The mural reflected and encouraged the growing interest in leisure travel in the early twentieth century, when the development of rail infrastructure was facilitating upper class tourism to the sea resorts on the Mediterranean. By advertising the beauty of the natural environment and the cultural landmarks of the French Riviera, the panels acted as publicity for tourism to the region.

The first extension of the mural, representing the cities of Lyon, Avignon, the castle of Tarascon and Nîmes, was executed in the 1920s and in 1930. At the beginning of the 1920s, two canvases representing Venice, also by Jean-Baptiste Olive, were added.

In the 1980s, the ticket sales counters were extended, which provided the impetus for commissioning eleven new images, as well as the renovation of the old ones. These tasks were entrusted to the Genovesio workshops, specialists in the restoration of old paintings and murals. The new panels were executed by the artist-painter Jean-Paul Letellier, between April 1980 and March 1981. The national rail company (Société Nationale de Chemin de Fer or SNCF) chose which sites were to be featured in the Paris-Lyon part of the mural. The 11 panels cover an area of 165 m2 (3 meters high x 55 meters long) and the work took place between April 1980 and March 1981. Two models were first made (one 0.15 m x 2 m and the other 0.50 m x 7 m) in order to find the right balance between landscapes and cities.

The gallery of frescoes was included on the French Ministry of Culture's list of historical monuments on 28 December 1984, along with other architectural elements of the gare de Lyon.

The frescoes were the subject of restoration work between 2014 and 30 June 2021.

== Description ==
=== Overview ===
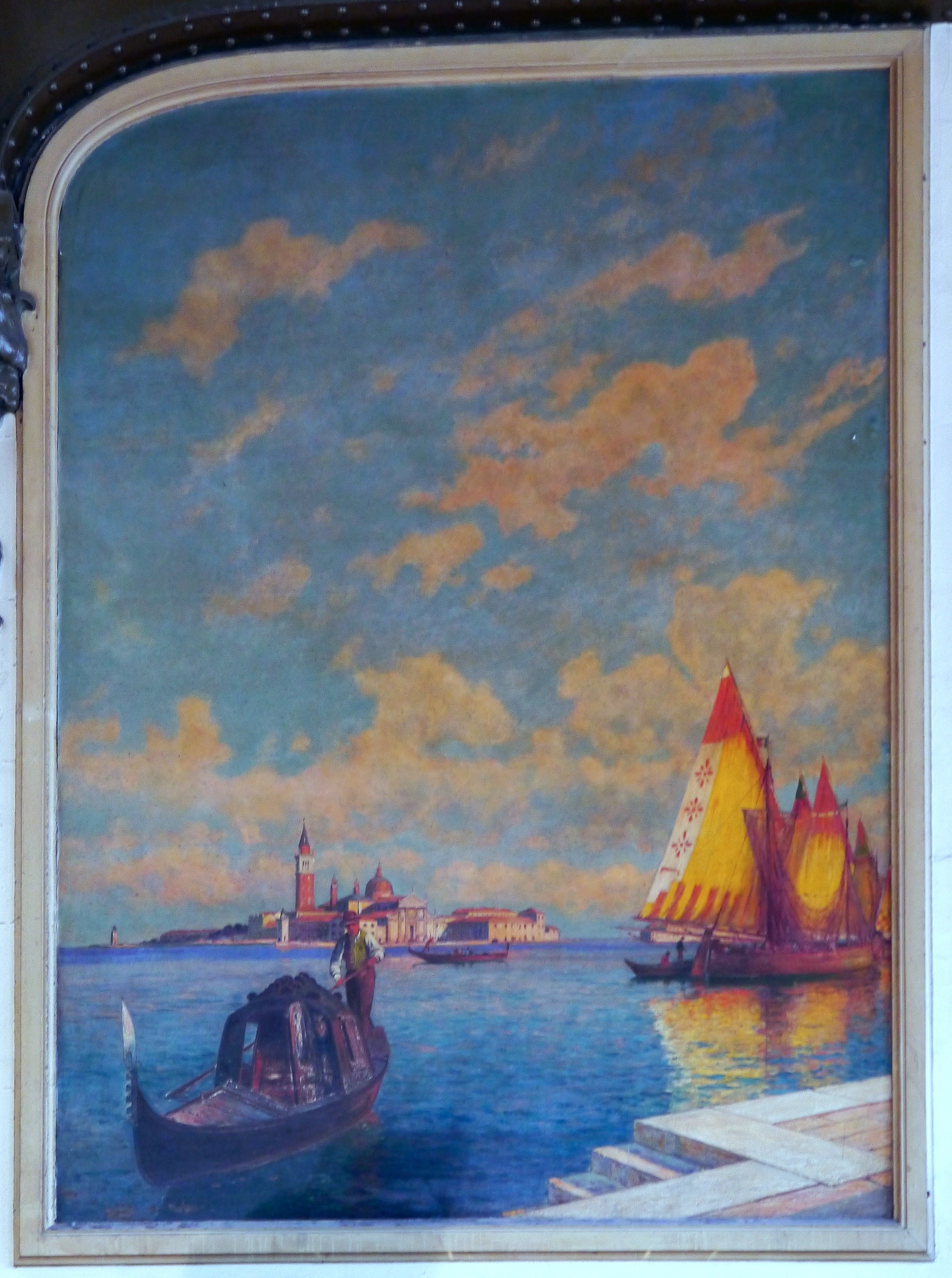
Supplemental panel depicting the lagoon of Venice

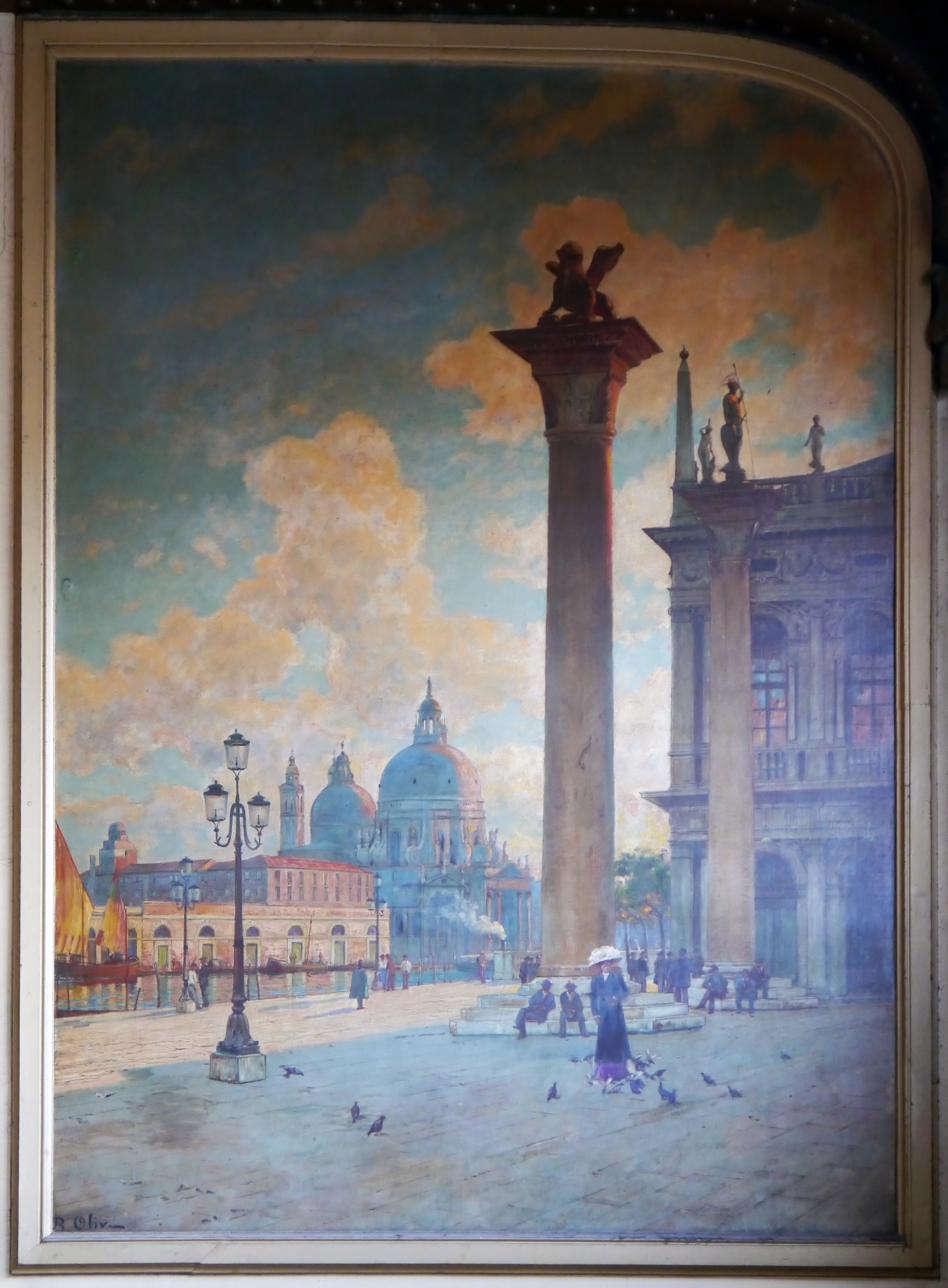
Another supplemental panel depicting St. Mark's Square and the Doge's Palace in Venice

The mural is technically not a fresco since it was not executed in wet plaster. It was painted on linen canvases that were then mounted on the wall (this technique is called marouflage). Although the mural was painted in three separate stages, the unity of the whole is reinforced by the repeated use of frames and imitations of pillars done in painted plaster.

The mural occupies the entire length of the gallery and depicts, in sequence, the main destinations and tourist sites accessible by train from the gare de Lyon. Seen from the perspective of the viewer, it begins on the left in Paris. More distant sites appear to the right of Paris. The final city is Menton, located on the border with Italy. Cities are represented with their characteristic geographical and architectural elements (churches, castles, etc.); their names are indicated at regular intervals above the painting, under the ceiling.

At the end of the room, on the Menton side, on the wall perpendicular to the fresco, are two panels of the same style. They represent Venice: the lagoon, a gondola and the island of San Giorgio Maggiore on the left panel, the Doge's Palace and St. Mark's Square on the right panel.

The original paintings (from 1900 and 1920–1930) represent only the Lyon-Menton section. The people depicted in these panels wear attire that clearly indicates they are from the wealthy segments of early 20th century society. Although painted much later, the 1980 panels appear to the left of the earlier paintings, thereby preserving the logical order of the mural since they represent the Paris-Lyon section of the rail line. The 1980 panels contain a number of anachronisms; contemporary cars and people in modern dress share the landscape with older rural images (such as a horse drawn hay cart shown in the Tournus panel). In addition, they depict certain cities that are not directly located on the Paris-Menton line, such as Vézelay and Semur-en-Auxois.

=== Cities and sites represented ===
From left to right, the fresco represents the following cities:

The panels executed in 1900 and 1920-1930: Lyon (Basilica of Notre-Dame de Fourvière); Avignon (fort Saint-André); Nîmes (Magne Tower); Montpellier (promenade de Peyrou); Marseille (Notre-Dame de la Garde); Toulon; Nice (promenade des Anglais); Monte Carlo; Menton; Venice (on two supplemental panels).

The panels executed in 1980: Paris (Pantheon, Eiffel Tower, Sacré-Coeur, Notre Dame, Opera Garnier); Fontainebleau (Chateau); Auxerre (cathedral Saint-Etienne); Vezelay (Sainte-Madeleine); Semur-en-Auxois (ramparts and dungeon); Dijon (cathedral Saint-Bénigne); Beaune (Hospices); Autun (cathedral Saint-Lazare, Porte d'Arroux); Tournus (abbey Saint-Philibert); Cluny (Abbey); Paray-le-Monial (basilica of Sacré Coeur).
