= Marouflage =

Technique for affixing a painted canvas to a wall

Marouflage is a technique for affixing a painted canvas (intended as a mural) to a wall, using an adhesive that hardens as it dries, such as plaster or cement.

== History ==
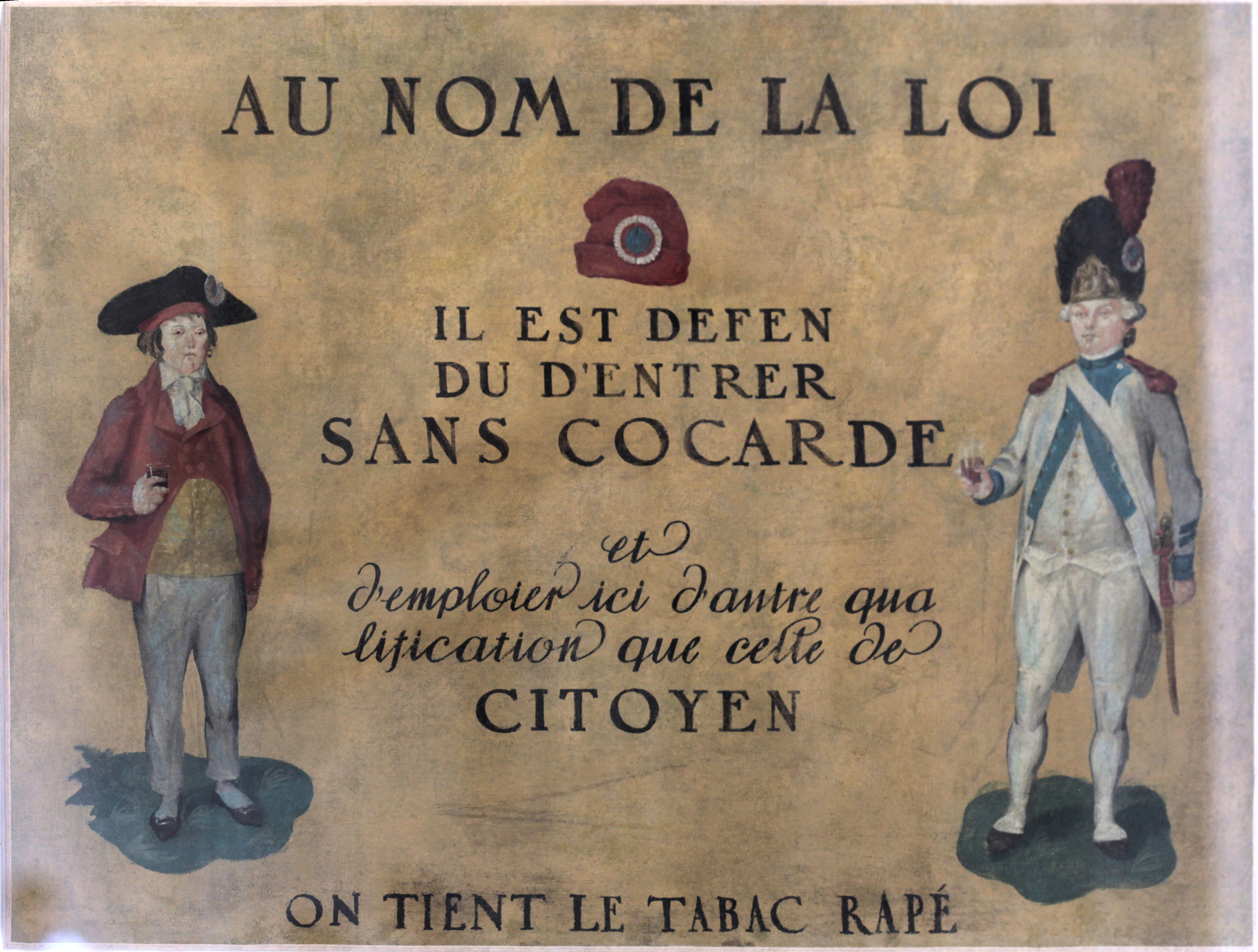
Interior sign of a Parisian pub, oil on canvas, marouflage on cardboard, (Musée de la Révolution française)

A French word originally referring to sticky, partly hardened scraps of paint, marouflage is a 3,000-year-old technique. Historically, artists used several types of adhesives including a rabbit-skin glue. White lead ore was used in the 19th and 20th centuries in the mixture to help it dry.

A thin coat of the adhesive is applied to both the wall and the canvas. Once the canvas is mounted to the wall, pressure is exerted with rubber hand rollers to smooth the canvas and remove any bubbles.

== Uses ==
=== Conservation ===
In art conservation, the word can be term of art meaning the removal of the painted surface from its underlying support, usually a stretched canvas. The process is more typically called transferring and can cause significant damage. Twenty-first century conservators seldom need to resort to this technique.

== Murals ==
Intended murals are normally painted on large canvases in the studio and attached to the wall on site, using a starch based glue (applied to the wall only). The murals can then be moved (by a professional) and reinstated elsewhere if required. The damage caused to the painting if removed using this technique is minimal.

== See also ==
- Grande fresque de la gare de Lyon
