= Grande Poste d'Alger =

Office building for postal services in Algiers, Algeria

Algiers Central Post Office
- بريد الجزائر المركزي
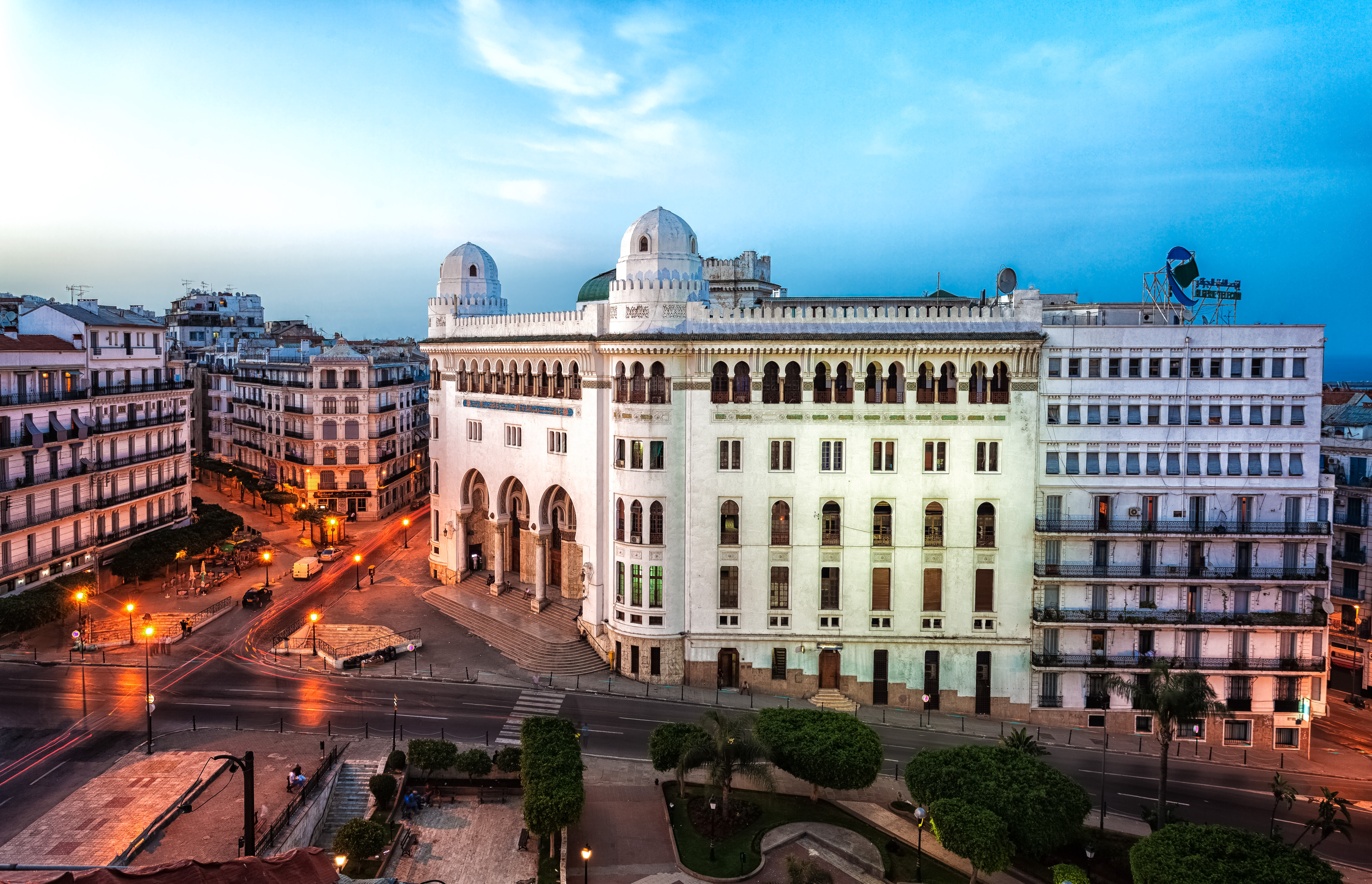
- Interactive map of the Algiers Central Post Office area

General information
- Architectural style: Algerian, Neo-Moorish
- Coordinates: 36.7731°N 3.0594°E

The Algiers Central Post Office, (Arabic: بريد الجزائر المركزي, French: Grande Poste d'Alger) is an office building for postal services located on Boulevard Mohamed-Khemisti, Alger Centre municipality in Algiers, Algeria. It was designed by architect Jules Voinot and Marius Toudoire and was constructed in 1910. It is Algeria's largest post office building, In 2015, the state turned it into a museum.

== Image Gallery ==
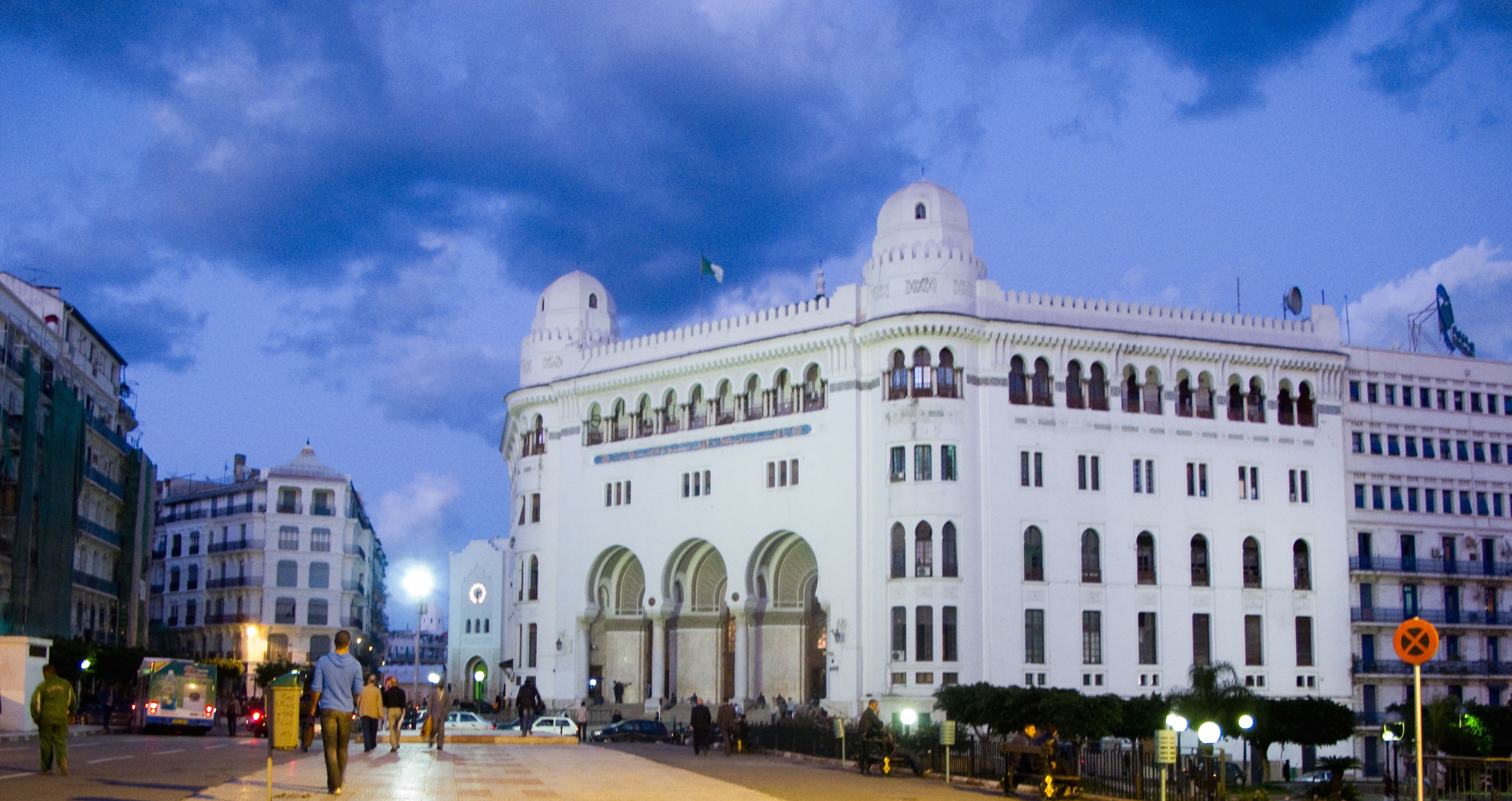

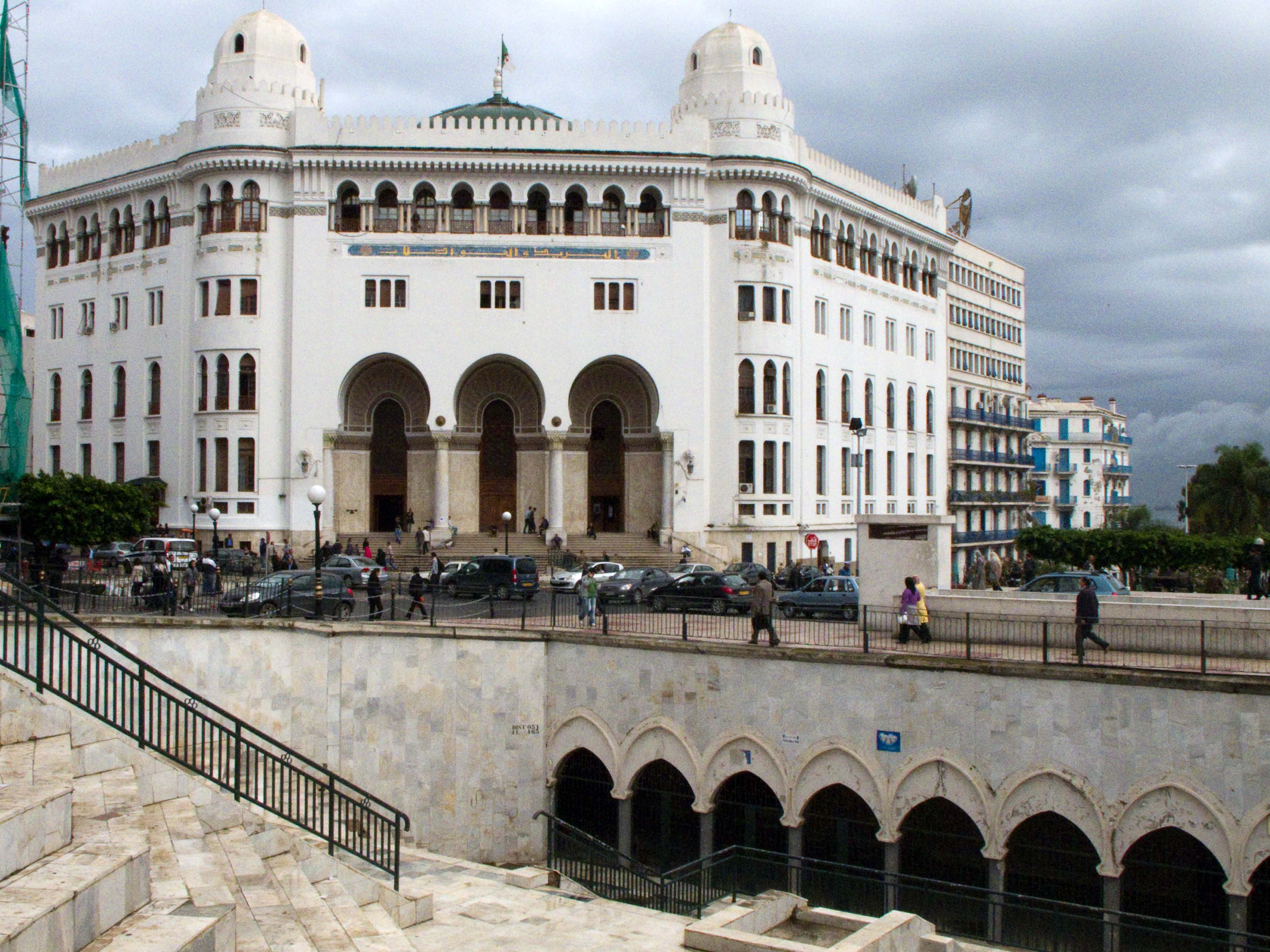

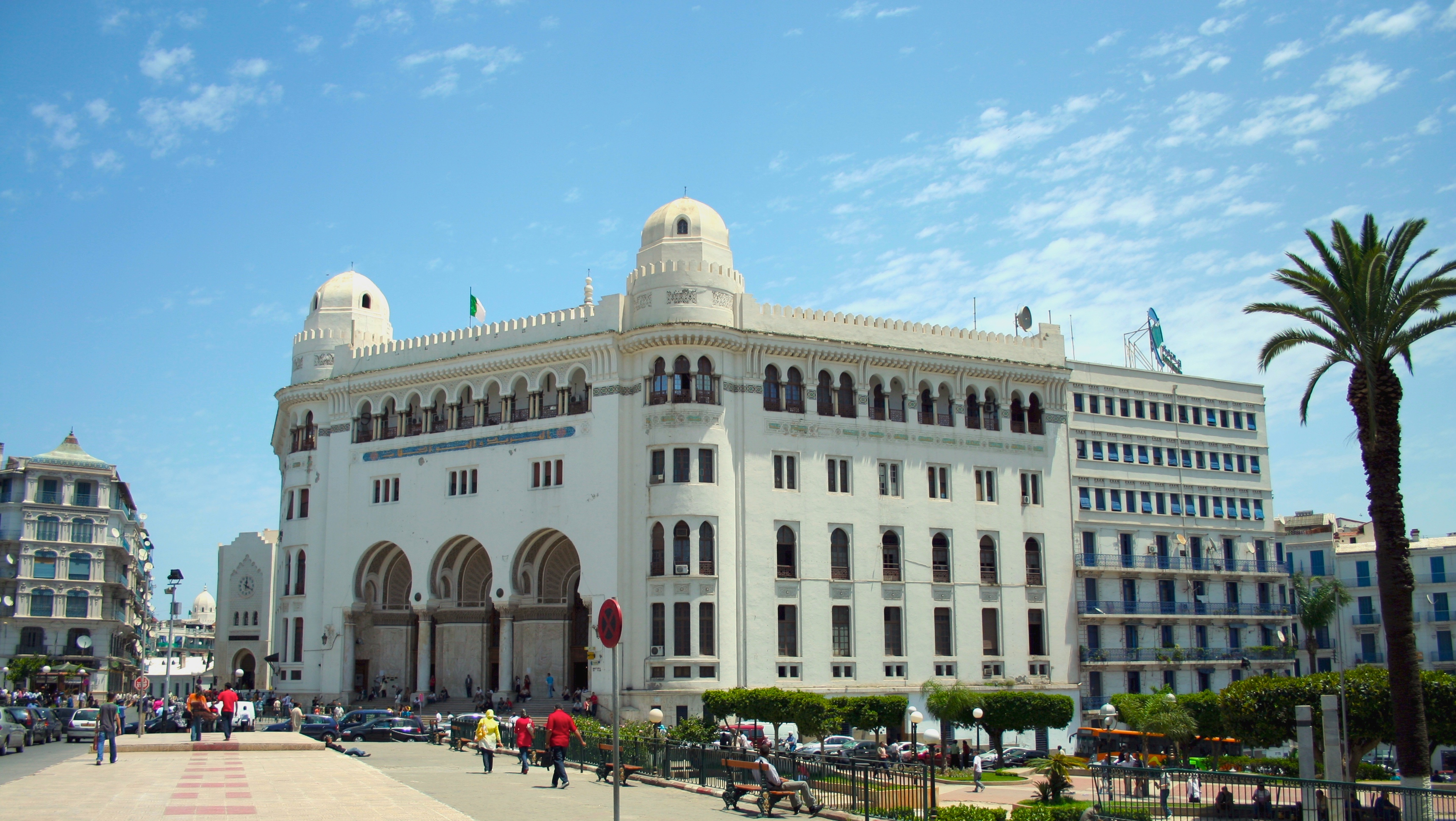

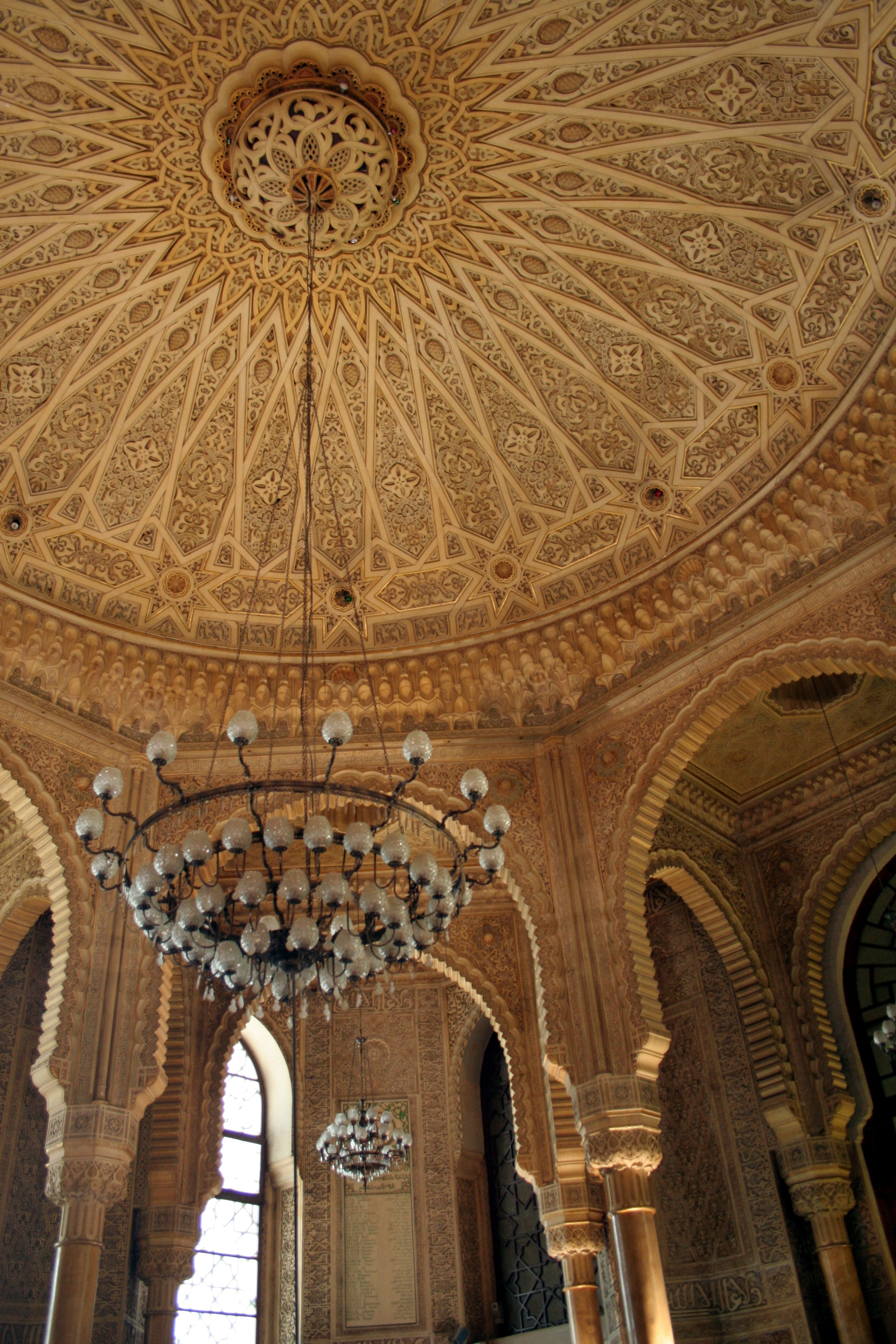

== See also ==
- Algérie Poste
