= Marius Toudoire =

French architect (1852–1922)

Denis Marius Toudoire (Toulon, November 15, 1852 - Paris, March 11, 1922) was a French architect. In particular, he built stations for the Compagnie des chemins de fer de Paris à Lyon et à la Méditerranée (PLM), including the main stations: Paris Lyon to Paris, Bordeaux-Saint-Jean and Toulouse-Matabiau. He also realized the Grande Poste d'Alger.

== Biography ==
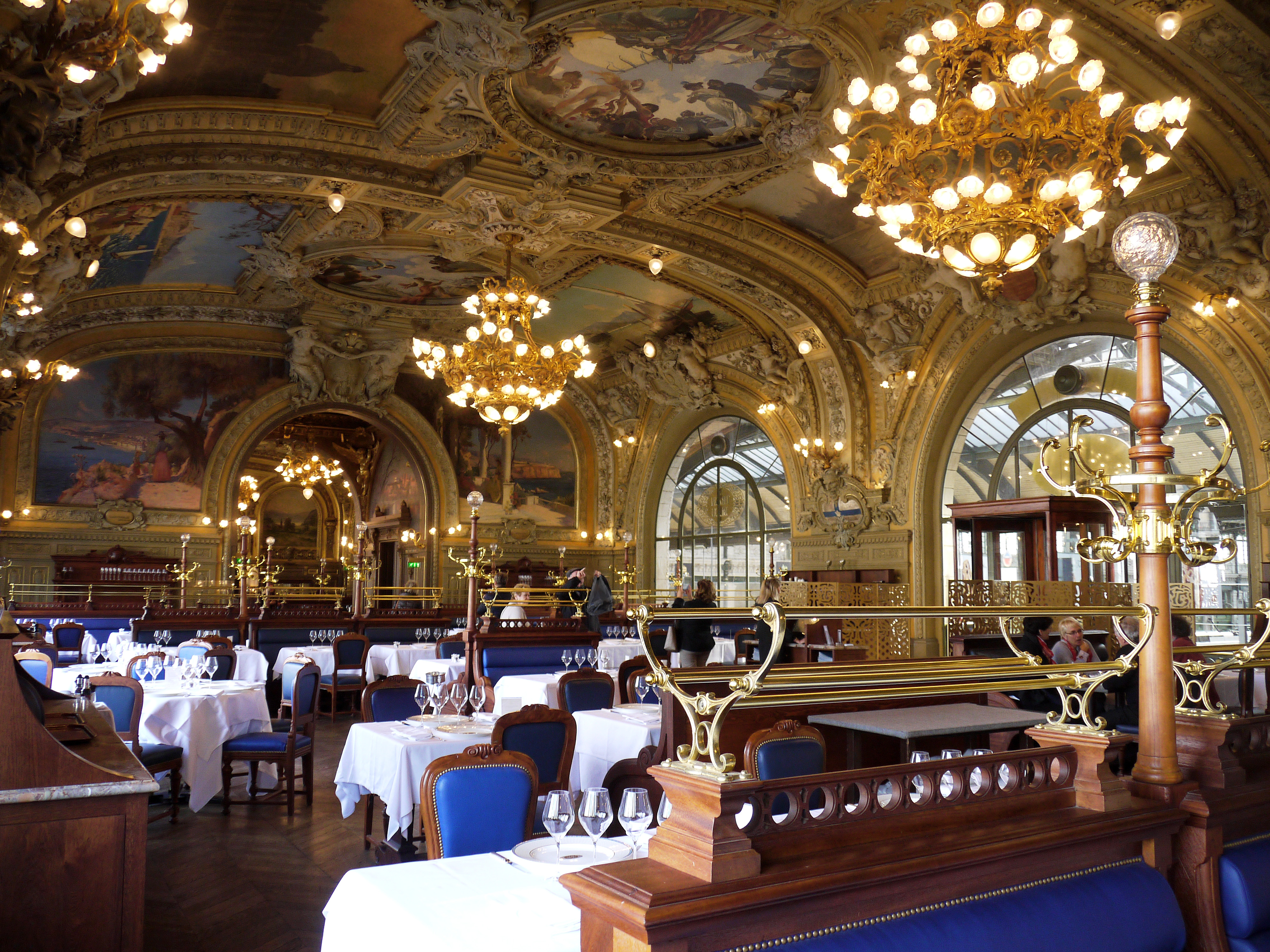
Restaurant Le Train bleu, Paris, Gare de Lyon.

Marius Toudoire was the son of Augustin Martin Toudoire and Chritine Élisabeth Joye.

He enrolled at the École nationale supérieure des beaux-arts in Paris where he studied with Charles-Auguste Questel (1807-1888), he came second at the Prix de Rome, and with his student Jean-Louis Pascal (1837-1920) he came first at the Prix de Rome in 1866. He graduated in 1879.

He was entrusted by the board of directors of the Compagnie des chemins de fer de Paris à Lyon et à la Méditerranée (PLM), chaired by Stéphane Adolphe Dervillé, with the construction of the Gare de Lyon in Paris and to have a keen eye on the decoration of this building, particularly in the choice of artists and the execution of the works according to the prescriptions of the Board.

He had his offices in 1895 at 88, rue Saint-Lazare.

He was the inspector of Civil Construction for the ministry of defence, he was the architect of the Palace of the National Manufactures at the 1900 World's Fair.

He died on March 11, 1922, at his home at 4, rue Sainte-Anne in the 1st arrondissement of Paris. A religious service was held on March 14 at the church of Saint-Roch, followed by a burial in the Garches cemetery.

== Works ==
- 1889 to 1898: Bordeaux Station of Bordeaux-Saint-Jean.
- 1895: Construction for Higarède at 172, rue Marcadet in Paris.
- 1895-1902: Gare de Lyon in Paris (including the restaurant Le Train bleu).
- from 1903 to 1905: Toulouse-Matabiau station.
- 1905 to 1908: Some thirty buildings for the 1908 Franco-British exhibition at Shepherd's Bush near London, in collaboration with Imre Kiralfy.
- 1910-1913:
- The Grande Poste d'Alger in collaboration with Jules Voinot;
- Town hall at Bône in Algeria;
- Prefecture of Constantine in Algeria.
- 1910: Station of Cusset (Allier).
- 1912: Station of Châtel-Guyon (Puy-de-Dôme).
Railway stations

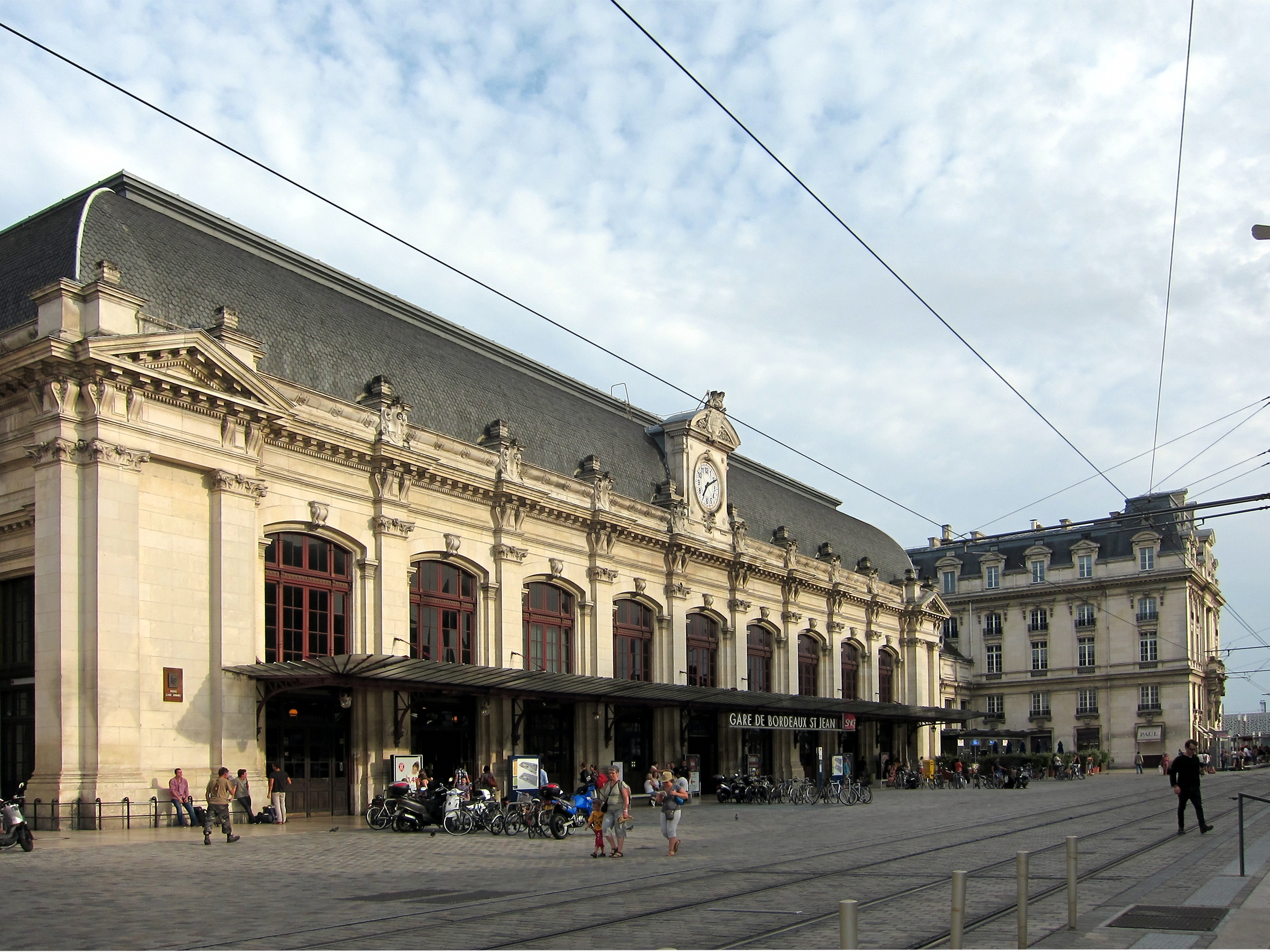
Bordeaux-Saint-Jean station

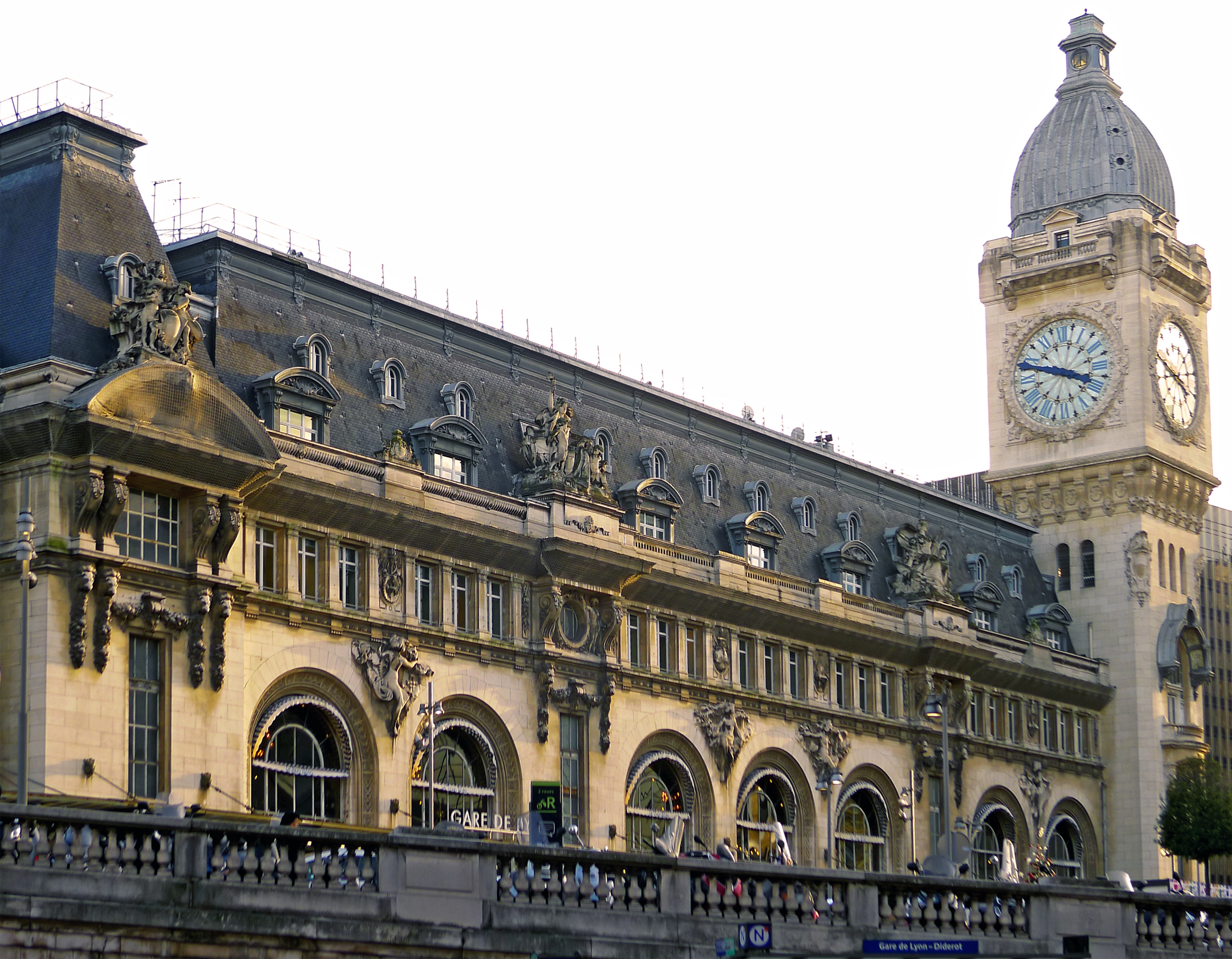
Gare de Lyon

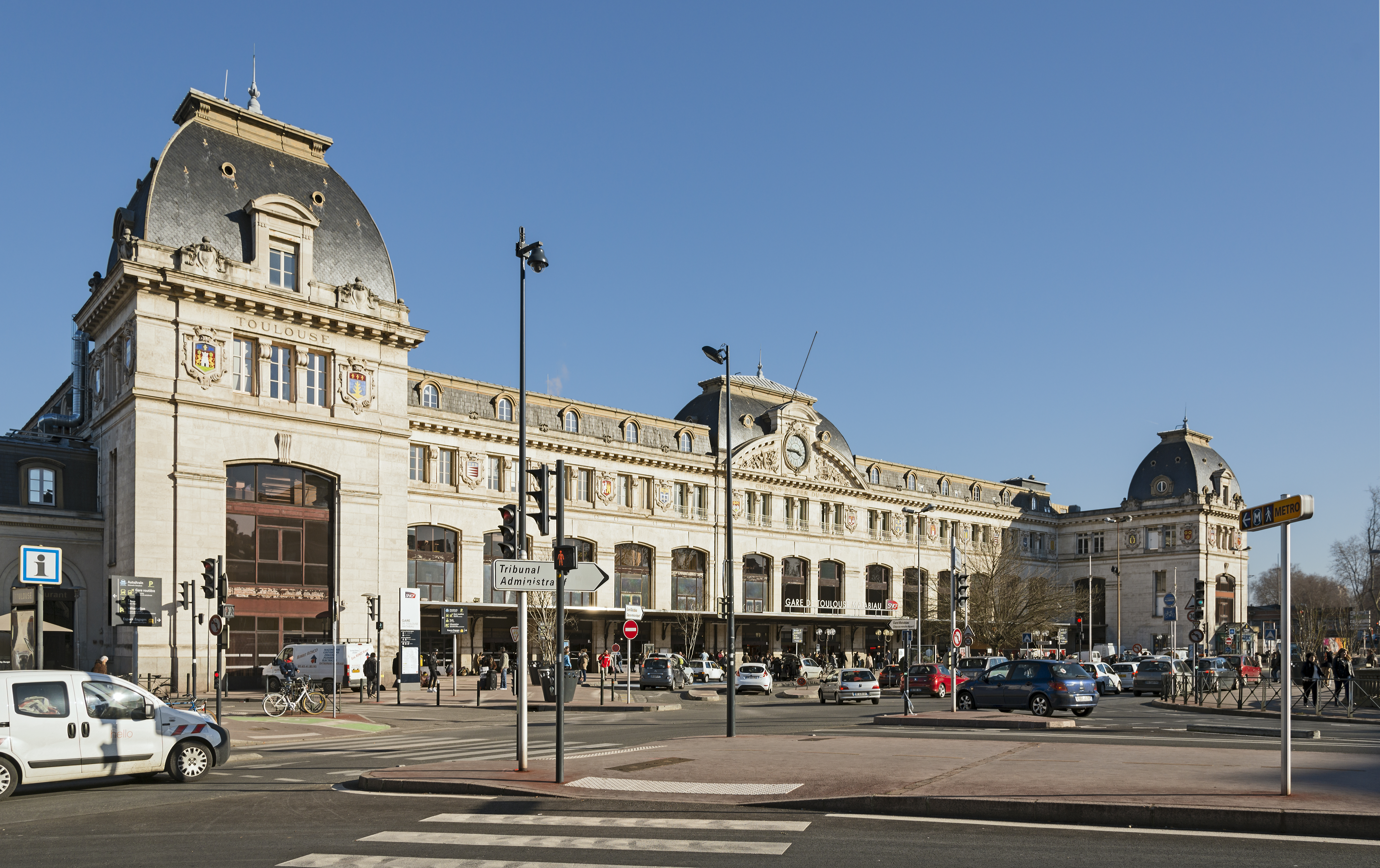
Toulouse-Matabiau station

== Acknowledgments ==
On August 14, 1900, he was named Knight of the Legion of Honor for his participation in the 1900 World's Fair in Paris as architect of the Palace of the National Manufactures.

The Palace of National Manufacturers

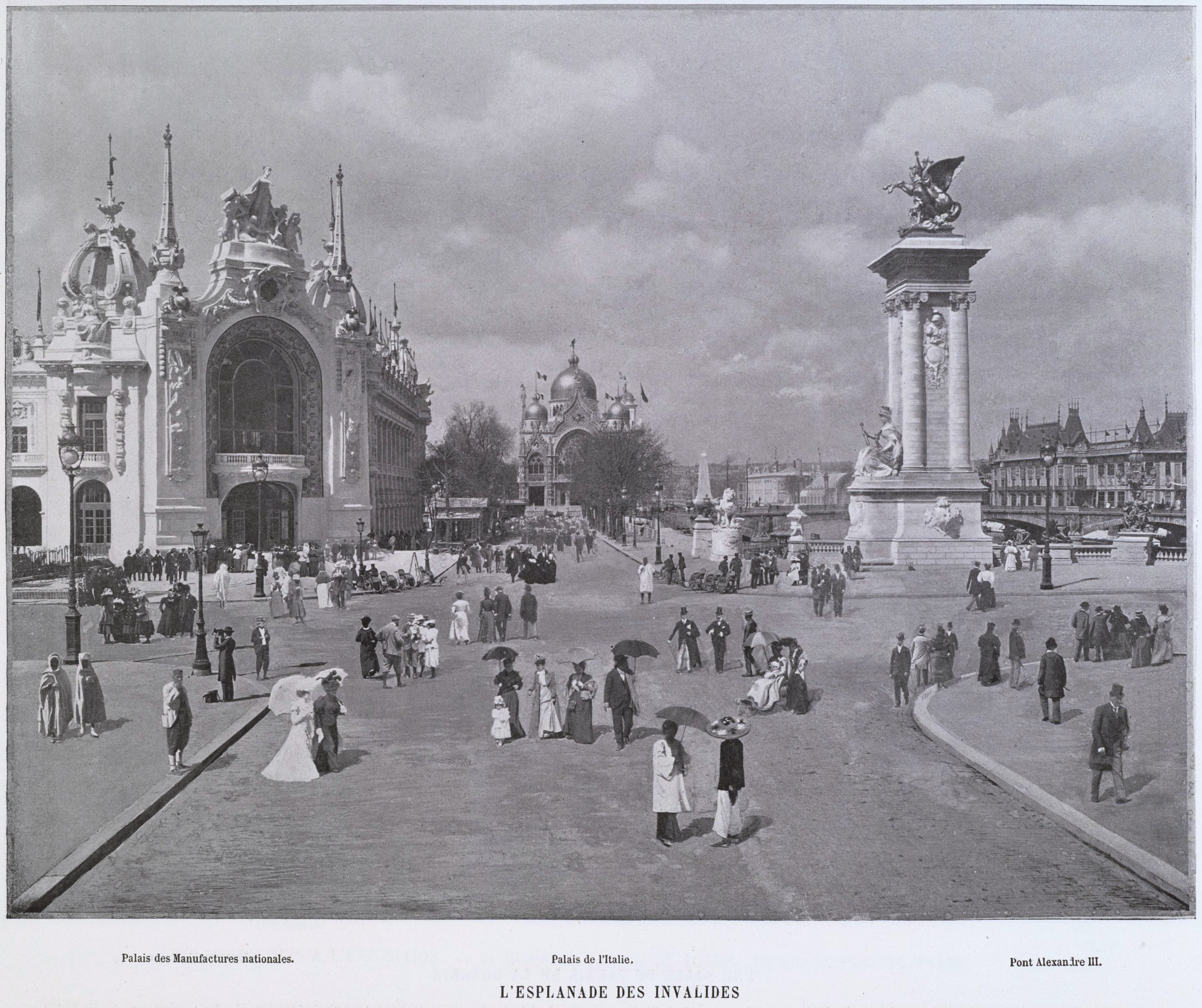

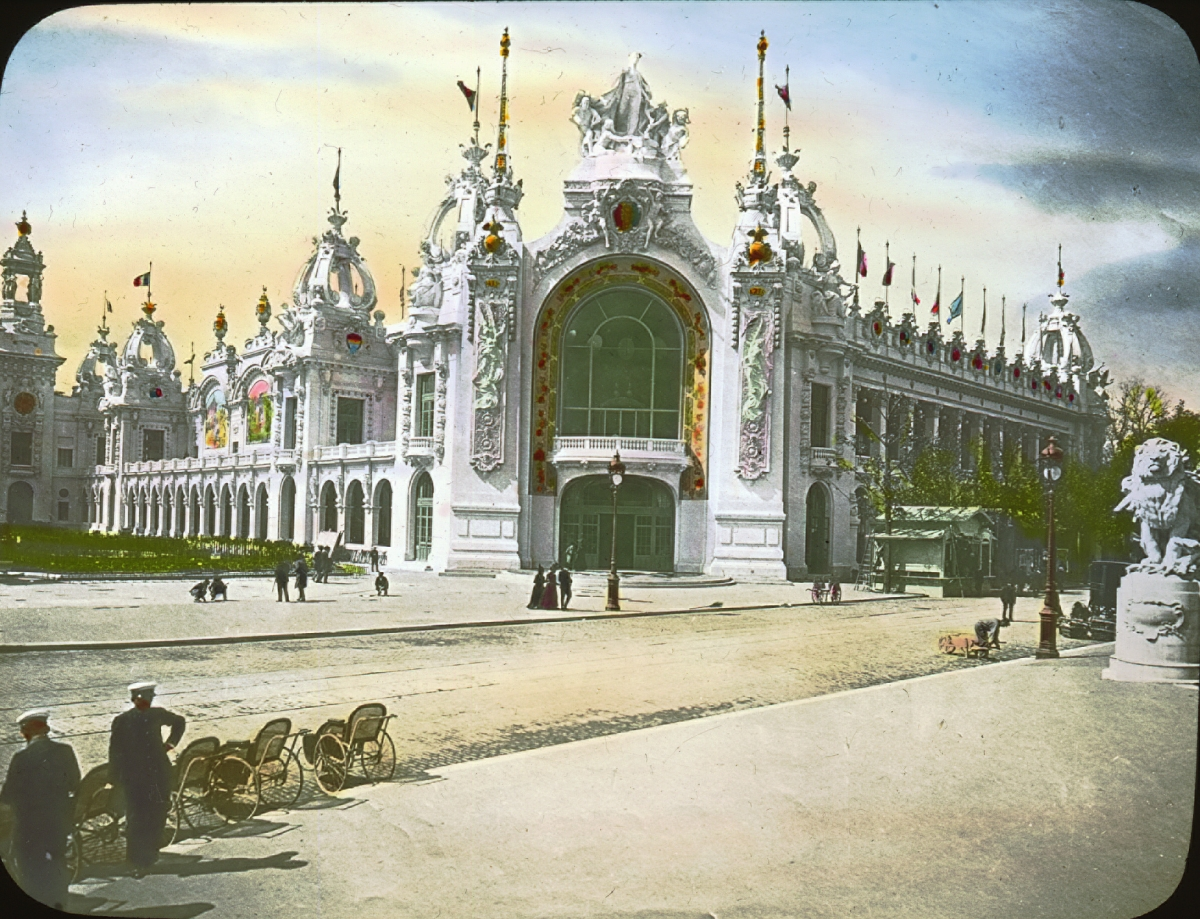

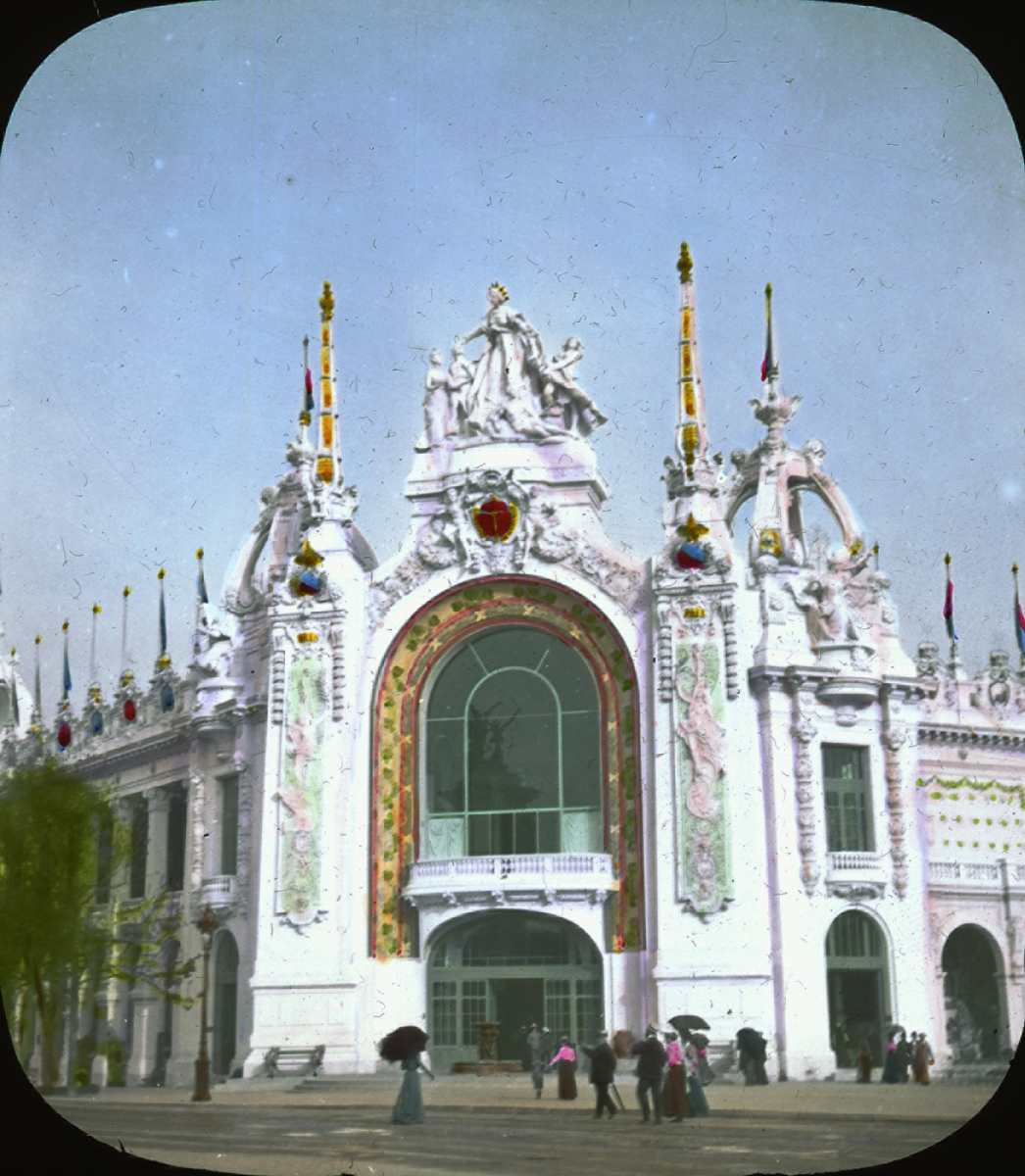

== See also ==
- Grande fresque de la gare de Lyon

== Bibliography ==
- "Denis Marius Toudoire". Base Léonore. Archives nationales.

== Related articles ==
- Chemins de fer de Paris à Lyon et à la Méditerranée
