= Bailhache =

Bailhache (from Norman French baille hache 'give axe', perhaps used as an occupational surname for an executioner or a woodman) is a surname known from Jersey, England, and elsewhere.

== Notable people with the name ==
- Alain Bailhache (born 1937), French painter
- Clement Bailhache (1856–1924), English lawyer and judge
- Jean Bailhache (1911–?), French author and translator
- John Bailhache (1787–1857), 10th mayor of Columbus, Ohio
- Sir Philip Bailhache (born 1946), Jersey politician and lawyer, Bailiff of Jersey
- Robin Bailhache (born 1937), Australian cricket umpire
- Sir William Bailhache (born 1953), Jersey lawyer, Bailiff of Jersey, brother of Philip
