= Octave Gallian =

French painter (1855–1918)

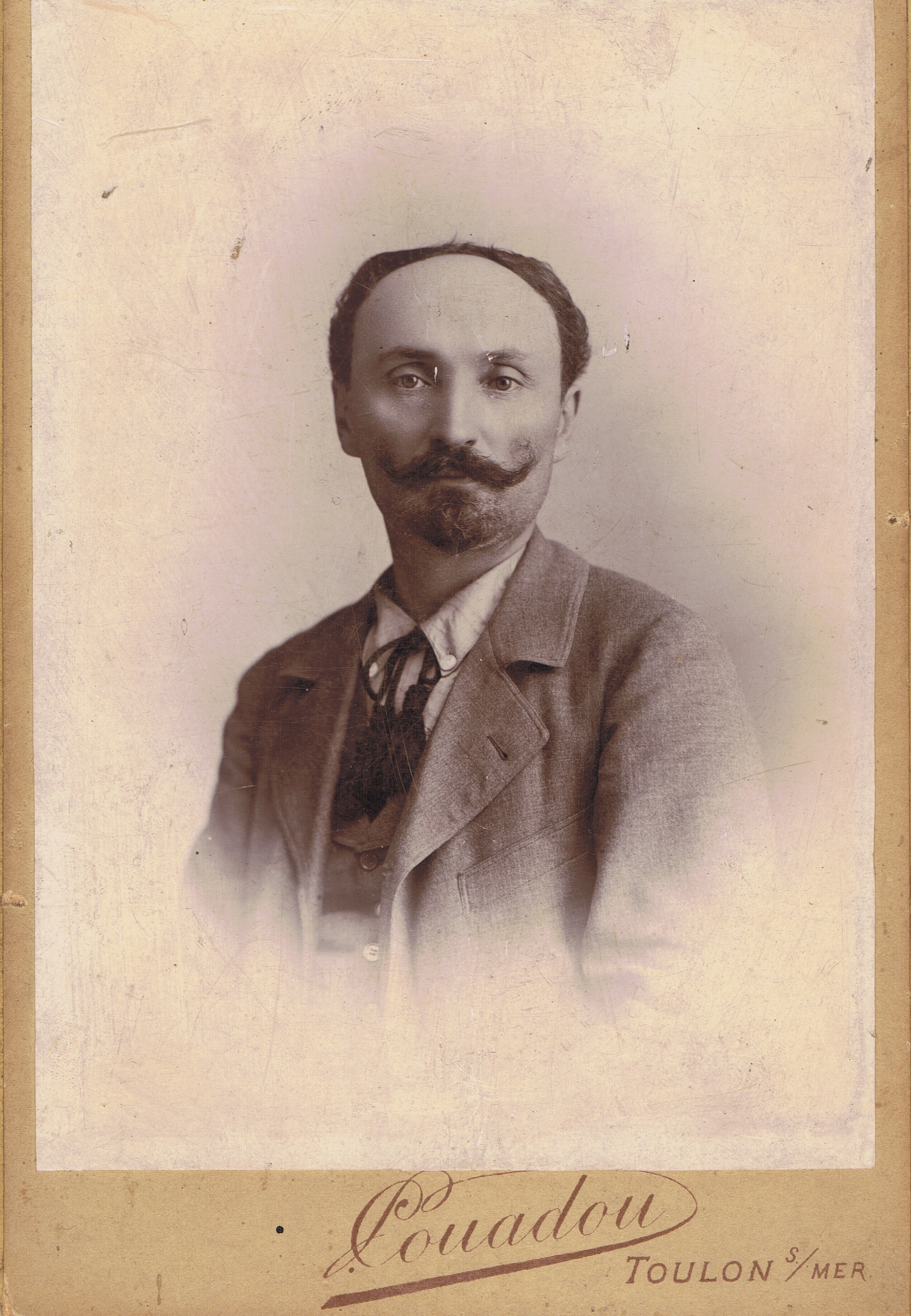
Octave Gallian (1890)

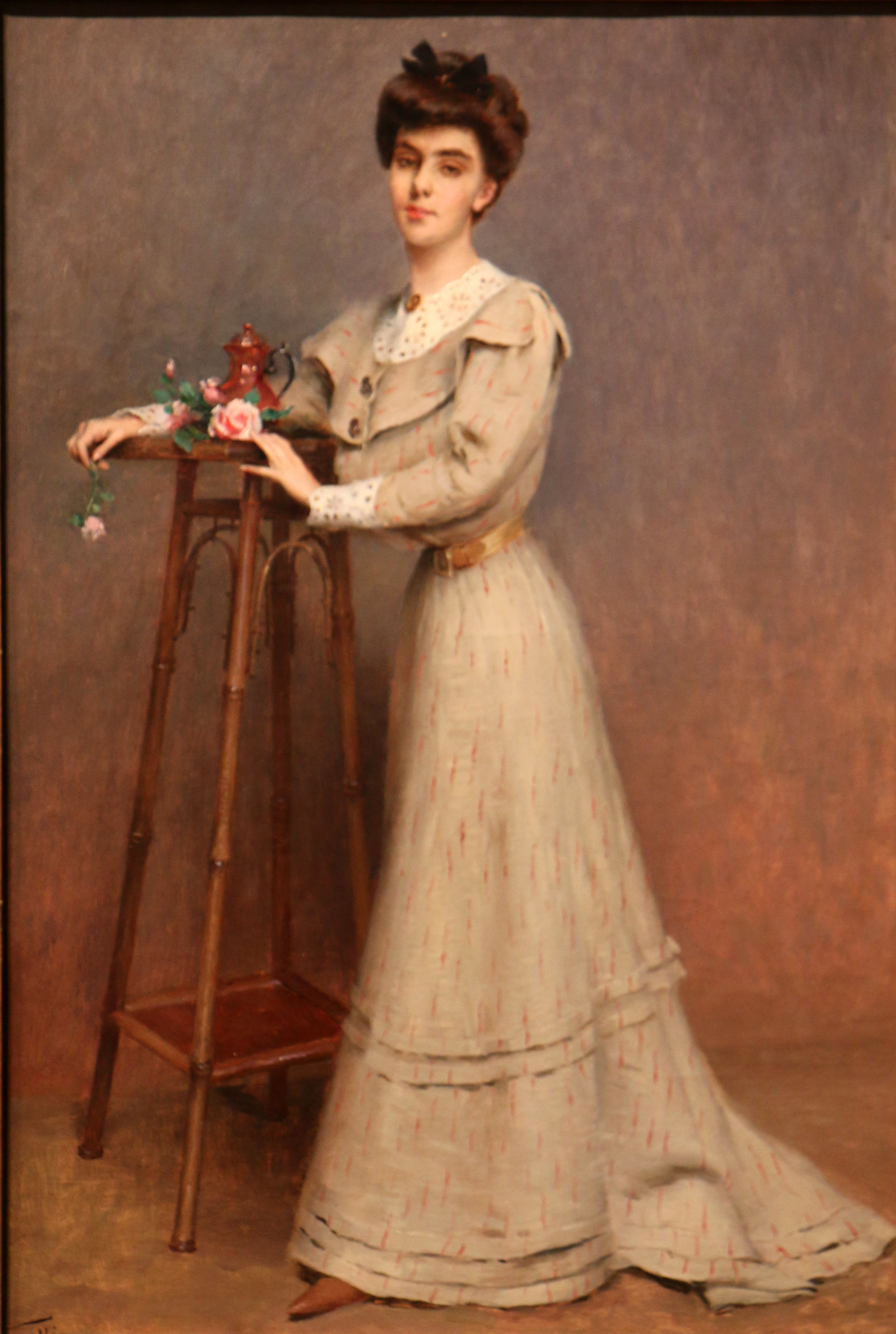
Woman at a Sellette
(a type of small turntable)

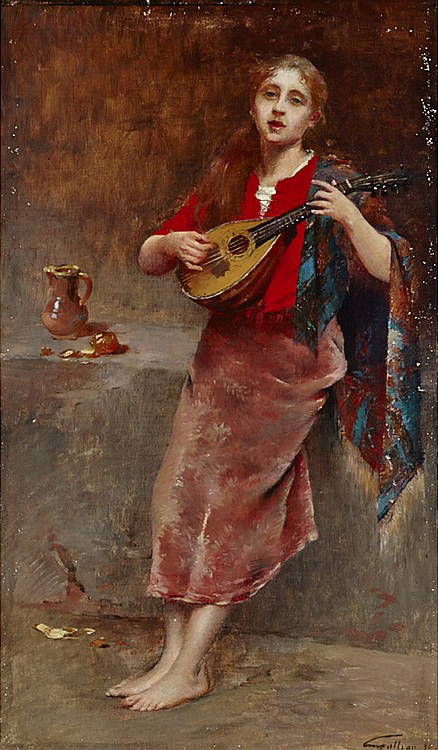
Peasant Girl Playing a Mandolin

Lazare Octave Georges Victor Gallian (21 July 1855, Toulon – 10 January 1918, Paris) was a French painter, known for portraits and landscapes.

== Biography ==
He was born to an industrialist who originally came from Vaucluse. Raised in an affluent environment, he initially showed great talent for playing the violin and piano, but eventually chose to pursue a career in art. In 1873, aged only eighteen, he became an associate in a workshop in Toulon, operated by Frédéric Montenard and Gustave Garaud.

To improve his skills, he attended at the École des Beaux-Arts in Paris, then enrolled at the Académie Julian, where he studied with Jules Lefebvre, Gustave Boulanger and Charles Ginoux.After graduating, he established his studio on the Rue du Faubourg Saint-Honoré, focusing primarily on female portraits. He maintained ties to his hometown, however, as a member of the "Atelier des Beaux-Arts de Toulon".

Between 1878 and 1905, he was a regular exhibitor at the Salon. In 1884, he was given honorable mention for a painting of buoys in Toulon harbor. This work was later purchased by the government and donated to the Musée de la Castre in Cannes. His wife, Honorine Lambert, appeared as a model in many of his paintings.

In 1887, he received a commission for two decorative panels in the staircase of the Musée d'art de Toulon, depicting a fisherman and a winnower. They were destroyed during a bombardment in World War II.

Both of his sons were taken prisoner in World War I and placed in remote camps. This put a strain on his already fragile health and resulted in his death.

His works may be seen at the Musée d'Angoulême, Musée de la Castre, Musée d'art de Toulon and the Musée de la Marine.
