= Verdoorn =

Verdoorn is a surname. Notable people with the surname include:

- Dirk Verdoorn (born 1957), Dutch-born French painter
- Inez Clare Verdoorn (1896–1989), South African botanist and taxonomist

== See also ==
- Verdoorn's law, economics law named after Dutch economist Petrus Johannes Verdoorn
