= Peintre de la Marine =

French honorary title

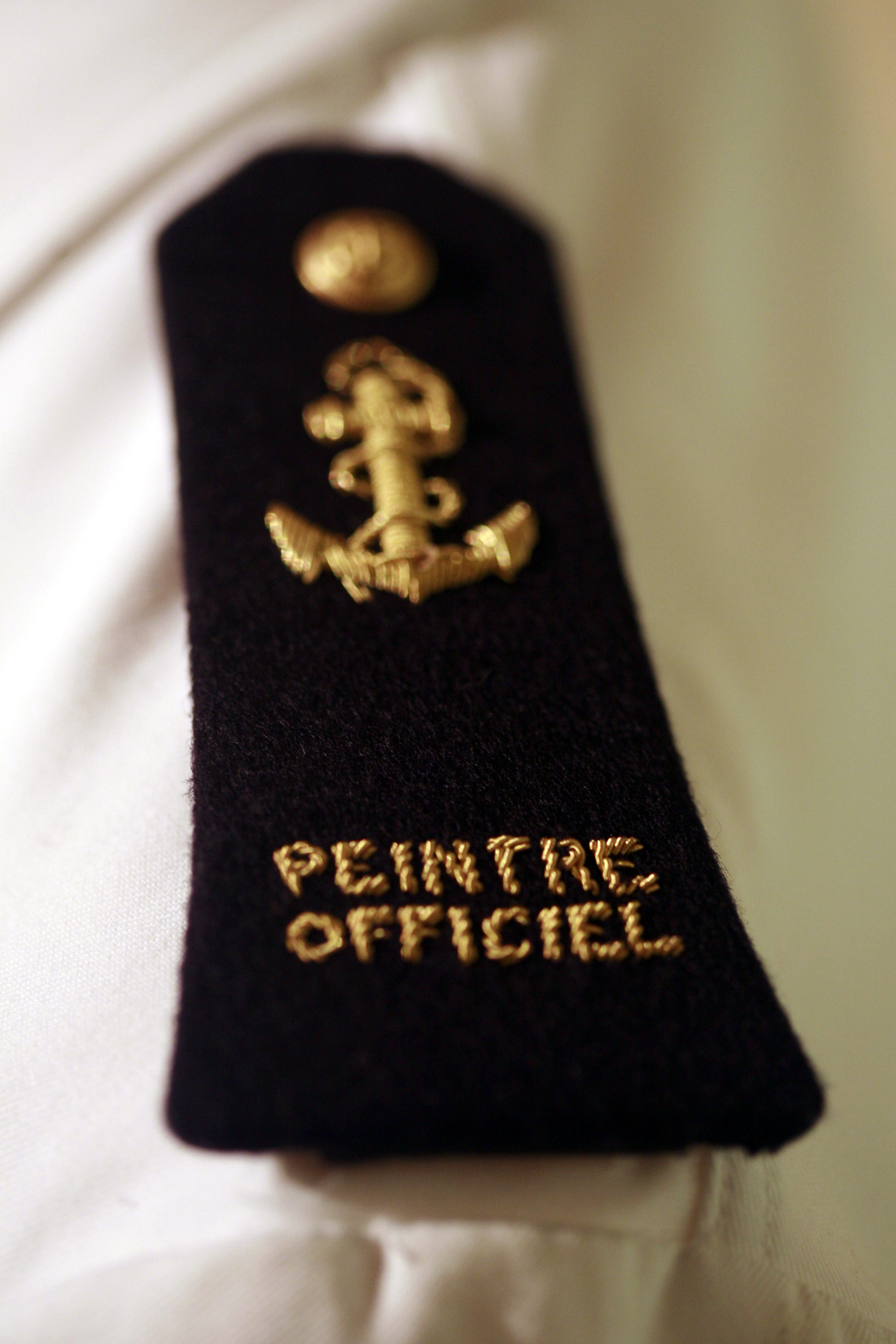
Peintre officiel de la Marine Shoulder insignia of André Hambourg.

Peintre de la Marine (French pronunciation: [pɛ̃tʁə də la maʁin], Painter of the Fleet) is a title awarded by the minister of defence in France to artists who have devoted their talents to the sea, the French Navy and other maritime subjects. It was set up in 1830 by the July Monarchy and can be awarded to painters, photographers, illustrators, engravers, and sculptors.

== Rights and privileges ==
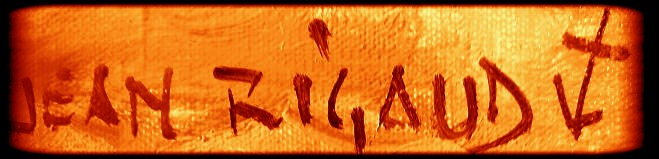
Signature of Jean Rigaud as Peintre de la Marine

The title is unpaid but does grant certain facilities and privileges:

- being able to embark on French Navy vessels
- wearing a uniform
- being allowed to follow one's artistic signature with an anchor
- belonging to the Service historique de la Marine.

The peintres agréés are named for a 3-year term by a jury of naval officers and peintres titulaires and presided over by a general officer of the Navy. To become a peintre titulaire, one has to serve as a peintre agréé for more than 4 consecutive terms (12 years).

== Peintres de la Marine since 1830 (by date of appointment) ==
=== 1830-1899 ===
- 1830 : Louis-Philippe Crépin, Théodore Gudin
- 1849 : Eugène Lepoittevin
- 1854 : Antoine Léon Morel-Fatio
- 1867 : P. de Crisenoy
- 1875 : C. Longueville
- 1876 : F. Roux
- 1880 : F.-P. Barry
- 1882 : L. Le Pic, P. Gaillard, Lepinay
- 1883 : M. Willenich, Pompon
- 1885 : Gaston. Roullet, E. Adam
- 1886 : T. Weber
- 1887 : G. Bourgain
- 1888 : M. N. Saulnier de La Pinelais
- 1889 : Eugène Dauphin
- 1890 : Léon Couturier, G. Le Sénéchal de Kerdreoret, A. Marcottes de Quivières, O. de Champeaux, La Boulaye, E. d'Argence
- 1891 : E. Maillart, L. Dumoulin, Eugène Chigot, P. Jobert, P. Bertrand
- 1892 : Moisson
- 1893 : T. Poilpot
- 1895 : P. Marsac, P. Liot
- 1896 : C. Bellenger, G. Ravanne
- 1898 : G. Vient, Arvid Johanson
- 1899 : François Charles Cachoud, E. Noirot, M. Perret
- 1900 : G. Galland, F. Legout-Gérard, P. Merwart, R. de Villars

=== 1901-1950 ===
- 1901 : M. Roy, Félix Ziem
- 1902 : P.-H. Simons
- 1903 : F. Regamey
- 1904 : G.-H Aubain, P. Place-Canton, A. Berthon
- 1905 : Gustave Fraipont, L. E. de Jarny, M. Noire, F. Olivier, F. Guey
- 1906 : P. La Gatier, A. Sébille
- 1908 : E. Berthélémy, E. Chevalier, A. Delaistre, Charles Fouqueray
- 1909 : R. Dumont-Duparc
- 1910 : A. Chanteau, G. Chanteau, F.-H. Gauthier, L. P. Félix, H. Farre, Eugène François Deshayes
- 1911 : L. Laurent-Gsell, A. Moreaux
- 1912 : L.-E. Dauphin, F. Salkin
- 1914 : A. Nivard, C. Cazes
- 1915 : Paul Signac
- 1916 : M. Maufra, L. Jonas, R. Desouches
- 1917 : G. Taboureau, dit Sandy Hook
- 1918 : A. Roux-Renard, L. Haffner, J. Lancelin, Gabriel-Hippolyte Lebas
- 1919 : A. Matisse
- 1921 : Charles Millot alias H. Gervèse, G. Arnoux, Pierre Bodard, L. Bonamici, E.-L. Gillot, P. Morchain, R. Pinard, H.-E. Callot, P.-E. Lecomte, Mathurin Méheut, Frédéric Montenard
- 1922 : André Dauchez, B. Lachèvre, F. Lantoine, C. Martin-Sauvaigo, J.-L. Paguenaud
- 1923 : Llano Florez, G. F. Roussel, Du Gardier
- 1924 : E. Barbaroux, J. R. Carrière, Paul Levéré, M. Moisset, R. Quillivic, G. Rollin de Vertury, Jean Roque, A. Theunissen, P. Leconte,
- 1925 : L. Madrassi, Vitalis Morin, G. Cochet, G. Drageon
- 1926 : G. Alaux, J. B. Roubaux
- 1927 : J. Gaboriaux
- 1928 : A. Silice, A. Gaussen, M. Gaussen
- 1929 : M. Guyot, dit Guy Loe
- 1930 : F. Alaux
- 1931 : V.-L. Delpy
- 1933 : J.-G. Daragnes, B. Roy, P. Roy, L. Simon, M. Vilalta
- 1934 : E. Blandin
- 1935 : Durand Coupel de Saint Front, dit Marin-Marie
- 1936 : Albert Brenet, F. Pascal, M. Menardeau, P. Bertrand, L. Dalloz, P. Bompard, Roger Chapelet, René-Yves Creston, Jim Sévellec, A. Verdihlan, J. Lacombe
- 1938 : J. Maxence
- 1940 : A. Goichon
- 1942 : E. Berthier de Sauvigny, J. Bouchaud, H. Cahours, H. Cristol, G. Guiraud, M. Laurent, Pierre Péron
- 1943 : Lucien Martial, P. Perraudin
- 1944 : L.-M. Bayle, Fernand Herbo, P. Noël
- 1945 : E. Ceria, J. Helleu, A. Lemoineau, A. Marquet, L. Pascal
- 1947 : H. F. Baille, V. Barbey, F. Decaix, A. Bizette-Lindet, G. Fouille, Henri de Waroquier
- 1948 : P. Dauchez, Charles Lapicque

=== 1950-99 ===
- 1952 : C. Cerny, F. Desnoyers, Jean Even, André Hambourg
- 1955 : R. Bezombes
- 1956 : J. Delpech, Jean Rigaud
- 1957 : Louis Chervin
- 1959 : Jacques Boullaire, L. Gambier
- 1960 : M. Douguet
- 1962 : Albert Decaris
- 1963 : G. Hervigo
- 1973 : François Baboulet, M. Depré, Michel King, Jacques Bouyssou, Henri Plisson, Gaston Sébire, R. Yan
- 1975 : Jean-Pierre Alaux, François Bellec, Jean Dieuzaide, J. Courboules
- 1977 : Michel Hertz, Jean-Jacques Morvan
- 1979 : Jean Le Merdy, J. Peltier, Roger Montane
- 1981 : Arnaud d'Hauterives, Marc Monkowicki, Claude Schürr
- 1983 : André Bourrié, Jean-Marie Chourgnoz, Serge Marko
- 1987 : Michel Bernard, Michel Bez, R. Savary
- 1989 : J. Cluseau Lanauve, Jean-Gabriel Montador, Michel Tesmoingt, Jean-Paul Tourbatez
- 1991 : Marc-Pierre Berthier, Michel Jouenne, Philip Plisson, Stéphane Ruais
- 1993 : Paul Ambille, Pierre Courtois, F. Perhirin
- 1995 : Jacques Coquillay, Christiane Rosset
- 1997 : Claude Fauchère, Christoff Debusschere, Jean-Pierre Le Bras, Alain Bailhache
- 1999 : Roland Lefranc

=== 21st century ===
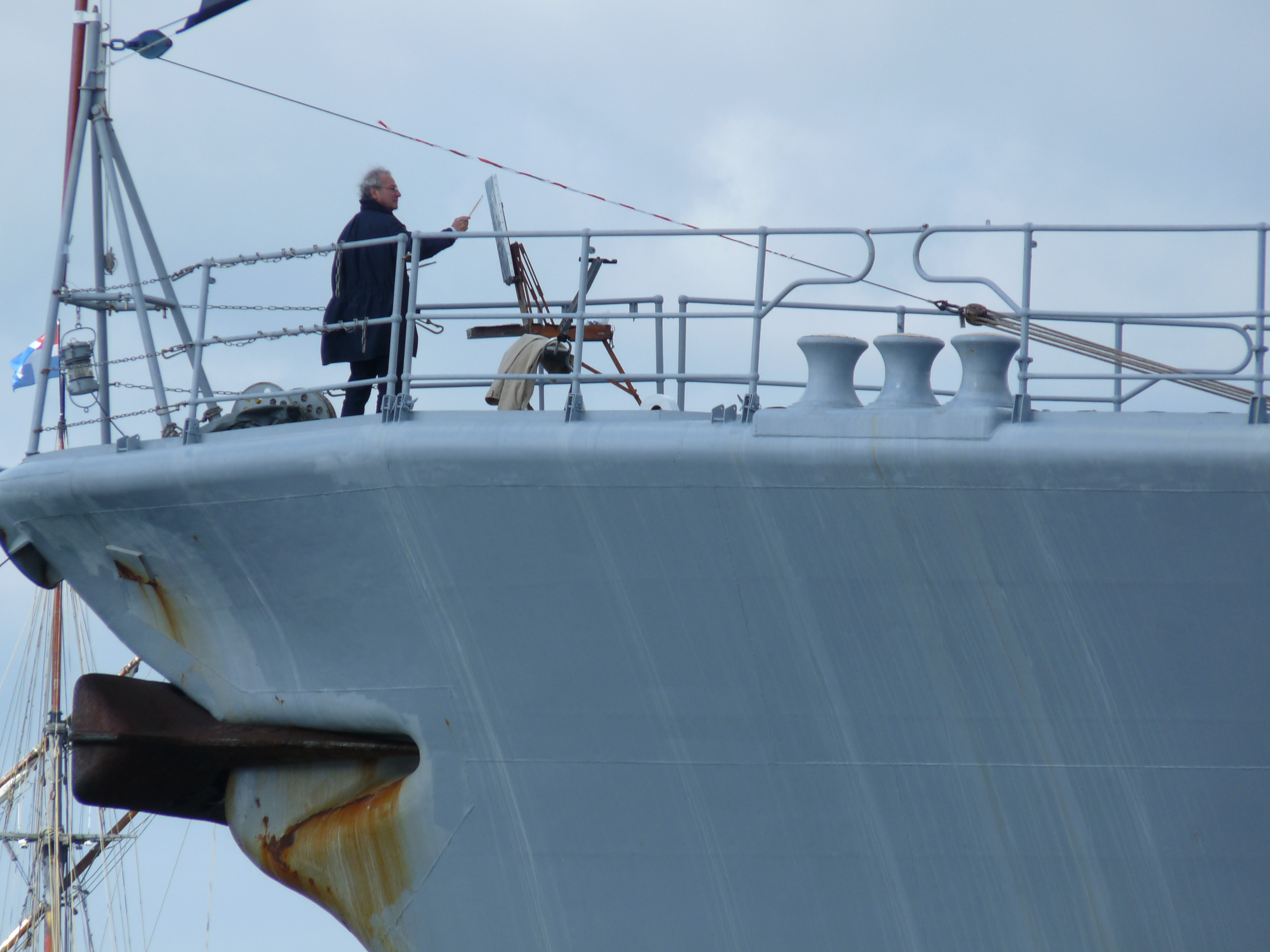
A painter aboard De Grasse.

- 2001 : Patrick Camus, John Pendray, Ronan Olier
- 2003 : Michèle Battut (painter), Michel Bellion, Titouan Lamazou, Christian Le Corre, Richard Texier, Jean-Marie Zacchi
- 2005 : Yann Arthus-Bertrand (photographer), Éric Bari, Jean Lemonnier (sculptor), Anne Smith, Dirk Verdoorn,
- 2008 : Jean Gaumy, Nicolas Vial.
- 2010 : Marie Détrée-Hourrière, Jacques Rohaut, Olivier Dufaure de Lajarte, Guy L'Hostis
- 2012 : Sylvie Du Plessis, Jean-Pierre Arcile, Yong-Man Kwon
- 2015 : François Legrand, Jacques Perrin
- 2018 : Olivier Desvaux, Alain Jamet, Hélène Legrand, Bertrand de Miollis, Thierry des Ouches
- 2021 : Emmanuel Lepage, Raphaele Goineau, Jonathan Florent, Ewan Lebourdais
