= Frédéric Montenard =

French painter (1849–1926)

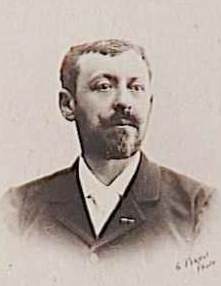
Frédéric Montenard (date unknown)

Frédéric Montenard (17 May 1849, Paris – 11 February 1926, Besse-sur-Issole) was a French landscape and seascape painter.

== Biography ==
He came from an old Provençal family, and his uncle was the sculptor Jean-Baptiste Giraud. His art studies began at the École des Beaux-arts, where his teacher was Pierre Puvis de Chavannes. He made his début at the Salon in 1872 with landscapes and seascapes; participating in their exhibitions on a regular basis for many years. In 1873, he joined with fellow painters Gustave Garaud and Octave Gallian to establish a workshop in Toulon, and was joined there in 1878 by Eugène Dauphin, .

He achieved his first career breakthrough in 1883 when two of his paintings were purchased by the French government. Six years later, he won a Gold Medal at the Exposition Universelle. Together with his mentor, Puvis de Chavannes, he helped create the Société nationale des beaux-arts in 1890. That same year, he was named a Chevalier in the Légion d'honneur. The following year, he introduced the famous Brazilian painter Giovanni Battista Castagneto to François Nardi, the maritime painter, who took Castagneto on as a student.

After 1892, he stopped painting along the Atlantic coast, in favor of Provence, where he painted landscapes and scenes of village life. He also became a teacher at the "École supérieure d'art Toulon Provence Méditerranée". In 1894, he was given a commission to decorate the Palais des Arts in Marseille. Six years later, he produced two large paintings for Le Train Bleu, a famous restaurant filled with the work of notable painters, near the Gare de Lyon in Paris.

After World War I, he became a permanent resident at the château "Croix de Bontar", which had been built by his father, in Besse-sur-Issole, with a first floor museum devoted to the history of Brignoles. In 1921, he was named an official Peintre de la Marine and, the following year, he provided 34 illustrations for a new edition of Mireille by Frédéric Mistral, an author he greatly admired.

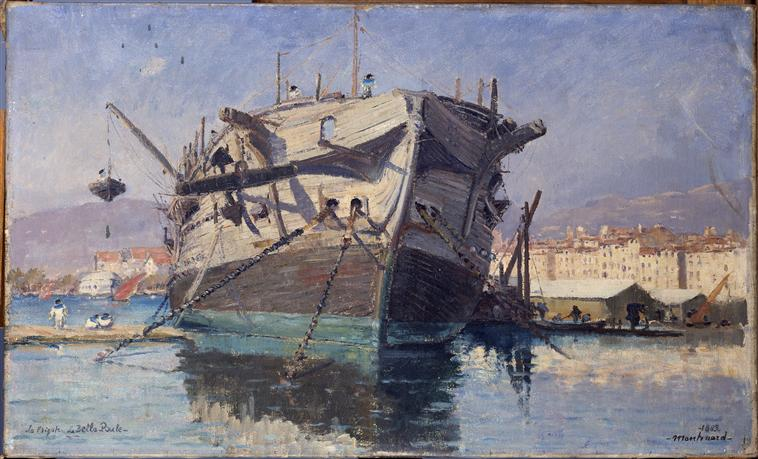
The Belle Poule at the Port of Toulon (1883)

A street and a small college in Besse-sur-Issole are named after him.
