= Rhône's 5th constituency =

Constituency of the National Assembly of France

5th constituency of Rhône
- inline Constituency of the National Assembly of France

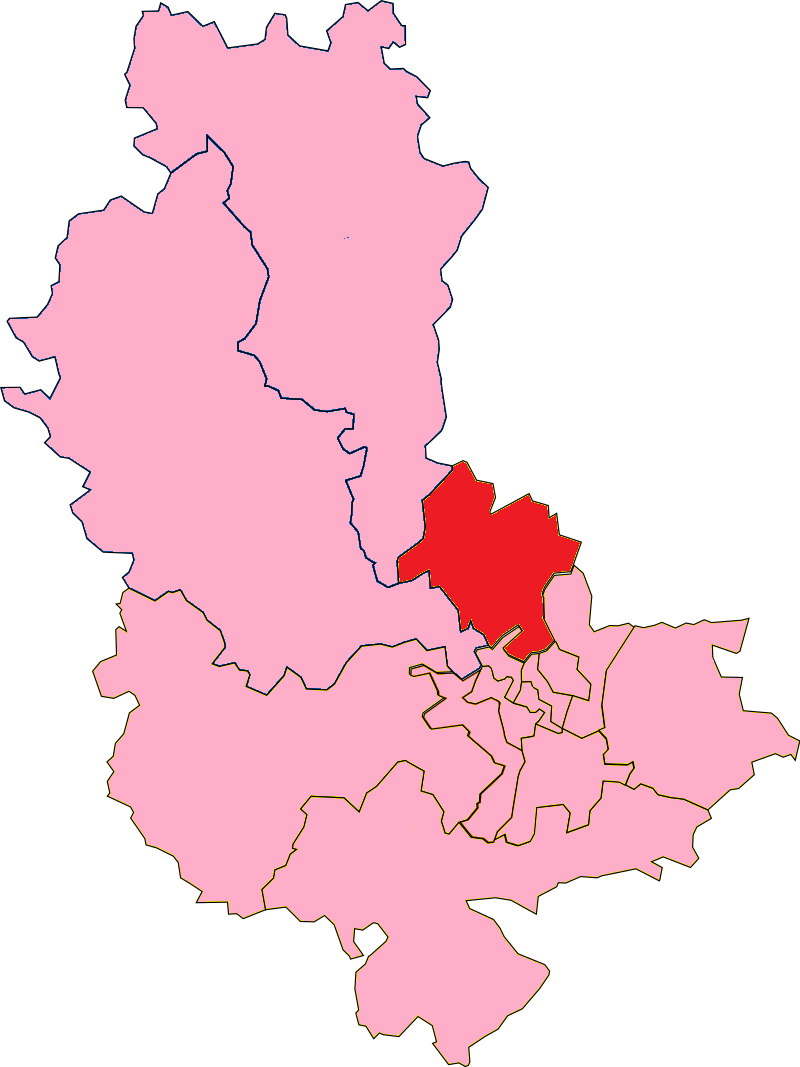
- Rhône's's 5th Constituency shown within Rhône
- Deputy: Blandine Brocard; MoDem
- Department: Rhône
- Cantons: Caluire-et-Cuire, Limonest, Neuville-sur-Saône
- Registered voters: 88072

The 5th constituency of the Rhône (French: Cinquième circonscription du Rhône) is a French legislative constituency in the Rhône département. Like the other 576 French constituencies, it elects one MP using a two round electoral system.

== Description ==
The 5th constituency of the Rhône lies to the north east of Lyon. The seat includes the town of Caluire-et-Cuire a suburb of the city as well as Neuville-sur-Saône further to the north on the Saône river.

Until 2017 the voters in the 5th had consistently supported candidates from the centre right when it fell to the En Marche! coalition along with all but two seats in the whole of the Rhône.

== Assembly Members ==
Election	Member	Party
1988	Jean Rigaud	UDF
1993	Jean Rigaud	UDF
1997	Jean Rigaud	UDF
2002	Philippe Cochet	UMP
2007	Philippe Cochet	UMP
2012	Philippe Cochet	UMP
2017	Blandine Brocard	LREM
2022	Blandine Brocard	MoDem
2024	Blandine Brocard	MoDem

== Election results ==
=== 2024 ===
Legislative Election 2024: Rhône's 5th constituency
Party	Candidate	Votes	%	±%
MoDem (Ensemble)	Blandine Brocard	21,552	32.01	-4.11
PS (NFP)	Fabrice Matteucci	17,831	26.48	+3.66
RN	Sasha Bitoum	17,090	25.38	+13.28
LR	Bastien Joint	9,431	14.01	−3.42
REC	Mathieu Bazin	1,009	1.50	−4.81
LO	Hélène Rivière	413	0.61	N/A
Turnout		66,797	98.68	+29.99
Registered electors		90,607		
2nd round result
MoDem	Blandine Brocard	29,758	45.61	+13.57
PS	Fabrice Matteucci	16317	25.01	−1.49
RN	Sasha Bitoum	19170	29.38	+3.99
Turnout		65,245	98.09	+46.94
Registered electors		90,622		
MoDem hold		Swing		

=== 2022 ===
Legislative Election 2022: Rhone's 5th constituency
Party	Candidate	Votes	%	±%
MoDem (Ensemble)	Blandine Brocard	17,508	36.12	-9.68
PS (NUPÉS)	Fabrice Matteucci	11,063	22.82	+7.33
LR (UDC)	Bastien Joint	8,449	17.43	−8.90
RN	Yves Duigou	5,865	12.10	+4.33
REC	Cédric Le Bel	3,058	6.31	N/A
DVE	Stéphanie Bouard	1,442	2.97	N/A
Others	N/A	1,093	-	−
Turnout		48,478	54.32	+2.54
2nd round result
MoDem (Ensemble)	Blandine Brocard	29,199	67.32	+7.06
PS (NUPÉS)	Fabrice Matteucci	14,175	32.68	N/A
Turnout		43,374	51.15	+9.04
MoDem gain from LREM				

=== 2017 ===
Legislative Election 2017: Rhône's 5th constituency
Party	Candidate	Votes	%	±%
LREM	Blandine Brocard	20,890	45.80	
LR	Philippe Cochet	12,007	26.33	
LFI	Céline Bernardi	3,552	7.79	
FN	Cécile Bene	3,544	7.77	
EELV	Jérôme Trotignon	2,769	6.07	
Others	N/A	2,847		
Turnout		45,609	51.78	
2nd round result
LREM	Blandine Brocard	22,348	60.26	
LR	Philippe Cochet	14,740	39.74	
Turnout		37,088	42.11	
LREM gain from LR				

=== 2012 ===
Legislative Election 2012: Rhône's 5th constituency
Party	Candidate	Votes	%	±%
UMP	Philippe Cochet	23,486	47.78	
PS	Jacky Darne	14,034	28.55	
FN	Alain Chevalier	5,835	11.87	
EELV	Véronique Toutant	2,098	4.27	
FG	Véronique Chiavazza	1,945	3.96	
Others	N/A	1,760		
Turnout		49,158	61.03	
2nd round result
UMP	Philippe Cochet	27,362	61.29	
PS	Jacky Darne	17,283	38.71	
Turnout		44,645	55.42	
UMP hold				

=== 2007 ===
Legislative Election 2007: Rhône's 5th constituency
Party	Candidate	Votes	%	±%
UMP	Philippe Cochet	29,258	55.92	
PS	Marie-France Lambert	10,385	19.85	
MoDem	Yves-Marie Uhlrich	4,451	8.51	
LV	Etienne Boursey	2,145	4.10	
FN	Marie-Christine de Penfentenyo	1,983	3.79	
Far left	Fabien Malvaud	1,046	2.00	
Others	N/A	2,012		
Turnout		52,760	62.90	
UMP hold				

=== 2002 ===
Legislative Election 2002: Rhône's 5th constituency
Party	Candidate	Votes	%	±%
UMP	Philippe Cochet	16,879	31.84	
PRG	Francoise Mailler	11,440	21.58	
FN	Marie-Christine de Penfentenyo	6,323	11.93	
UDF	Gilles Vesco	6,201	11.70	
DVD	Jacques Meyer	5,311	10.02	
DVD	Agnes Gardon-Chemain	1,898	3.58	
PCF	Madeleine Jorand	1,086	2.05	
Others	N/A	3,876		
Turnout		53,617	67.78	
2nd round result
UMP	Philippe Cochet	29,989	65.47	
PRG	Francoise Mailler	15,817	34.53	
Turnout		47,119	59.57	
UMP gain from UDF				

=== 1997 ===
Legislative Election 1997: Rhône's 5th constituency
Party	Candidate	Votes	%	±%
UDF	Jean Rigaud	13,632	27.80	
PS	Madeleine Petitjean	10,923	22.27	
FN	Pierre Terrier	8,763	17.87	
UDF	Bernard Roger-Dalbert*	5,978	12.19	
PCF	Madeleine Jorand	2,851	5.81	
LV	Etienne Tête	1,723	3.51	
DVD	Philippe Lamy	1,612	3.29	
GE	Jean-Pierre Allegre	1,161	2.37	
MEI	Anne Romer	1,130	2.30	
Others	N/A	1,266		
Turnout		50,988	66.93	
2nd round result
UDF	Jean Rigaud	31,161	61.26	
PS	Madeleine Petitjean	19,707	38.74	
Turnout		53,701	70.50	
UDF hold				

* UDF dissident
