= Luc-Marie Bayle =

French painter

- Born: 30 January 1914; Malo-les-Bains, Paris, France
- Died: 11 October 2000 (aged 86); Paris, France
- Known for: Painting

Luc-Marie Bayle (30 January 1914 – 11 October 2000) was a French naval officer, painter, and artist.

== Career ==
=== Youth and military career ===
Bayle was born in Malo-les-Bains. He began his military career in 1932 when he entered the École Navale. After promotion he sailed on various ships and conducted campaigns to China and Africa. After attending further marine school training in Lorient, Bayle completed two missions, one in 1948 the other in 1949, to Adélie Land on the Commandant Charcot for which he became the on-board photographer, historian, and official painter. He commanded the French Navy in Polynesia from 1956 to 1958. In 1975 he was elected to the Académie de Marine.

=== Museum and historical work ===
In 1954 Bayle created a large model aircraft carrier on the Seine in order to demonstrate the complexity of the equipment and electronics involved. He was the director of the Musée national de la Marine in Paris from 1972 to 1980 and created the concept of a "port-museum", especially in Port-Louis, near Lorient. He was particularly interested in historic ships such as the Großherzogin Elisabeth, a three-masted war-damaged ship which was brought back to Brest in 1946 and renamed the Duchesse Anne. After serving in the Navy the ship sank into neglect. After an initial restoration project funded by the Port-Louis museum, Bayle launched a new call for the rescue of the Duchess Anne in February 1979, deeming her condition to be critical. It was ultimately Dunkirk that restored the ship in 1980/81, where it remains on display. Bayle founded the French maritime heritage preservation association "AMERAMI" in 1975.

=== Artistry ===
Bayle drew and painted, mostly in watercolors, beginning with his first expedition to China where he developed his talent in this discipline. Other locations included in this collection are Tahiti, Moorea, Bora Bora and Mangareva, as well as the less frequented Île Saint-Paul, Macquarie Island, Kerguelen Islands, and the Balleny Islands. His works are complemented by rag sewn tapestries, posters, and advertisements. He also illustrated many books.

Bayle was appointed Peintre de la Marine in 1944. After the war ended he received an order for a tapestry for the officers of the Rue Royale. Due to his lack of funds, the Naval police provided him with a bundle of material and a team of seamstresses to perform the work. In the 1948 mission to Adélie Land, Commander Max Jacques Henri Douguet accepted Bayle on board with the prevision that he learn how to use a film camera. During the three months of travel Bayle not only learned how to film, he also composed a tapestry commemorating the arrival of Jules Dumont d'Urville to the territory in 1840. In addition to writing a diary covering the first two Adélie Land expeditions, Bayle wrote Le Voyage de la Nouvelle Incomprise recounting the same events. From 1960 to 1972, with Hervé Baille Bayle, he created a publishing company (B & B). After designing the logo for the legendary ship Calypso, he conceived and designed the crystal sword used for Jacques Cousteau's official Académie française reception in 1989.

== Death an legacy ==
Bayle died on 11 October 2000 in Paris. On 1 January 2003, the Universal Postal Union issued a stamp in his honour.

== Awards ==
- Officier de la Légion d'honneur
- Officier du Ordre du Mérite Maritime
- Officier des Ordre des Palmes Académiques

== Works ==
=== Illustrated books ===
- Marcelle Vioux, Jeanne d'Arc, 1942
- Jean Variot, Les Coursiers de Sainte-Hélène, 1944
- Pierre Dubard, Le Charcot et La Terre Adélie, France Empire, 1951
- Jacques Mordal, La Marine en bois, Paris, Fayard, 1975

=== Bibliography ===
- Luc-Marie Bayle, Chemin de Croix, Paris : ed. Lahure, 1943
- Luc-Marie Bayle, in collaboration with Pierre Dubard, Le Charcot et la Terre Adélie, Paris : France-Empire, 1951
- Luc-Marie Bayle, Le Voyage de la Nouvelle-Incomprise, Paris : ed. Ozanne, 1953
- Luc-Marie Bayle, Les corvettes FNFL, Paris : Service historique de la marine, 1966
- Luc-Marie Bayle, in collaboration with Hervé Cras, La Marine en bois, Paris : Fayard, 1978
- Luc-Marie Bayle, Mathurin Méheut, Rennes : Éd. Ouest-France, 1984

=== Film ===
Bayle directed and edited a 25 minute film depicting the 1948 and 1949 Adélie Land missions. The film is held at ECPAD.
