= Plisson =

Plisson is a surname and may refer to:

- Auguste-Arthur Plisson (died 1832), French chemist
- Jules Plisson (born 1991), French rugby union player
- Louane Plisson (born 2012), French artistic gymnast
- Pascal Plisson, French screenwriter and documentary filmmaker
- Patrick Plisson (born 1952), French Grand Prix motorcycle road racer
- Philip Plisson (born 1947), French maritime photographer
- Philippe Plisson (born 1951), French politician
