= Blandine Brocard =

French politician (born 1981)

- Brocard in 2026

Member of the National Assembly for Rhône's 5th constituency
- Incumbent
- Assumed office 21 June 2017
- Preceded by: Philippe Cochet

Personal details
- Born: 3 November 1981 (age 44) Strasbourg, France
- Party: La République En Marche! (2017–2020); Democratic Movement (2020–present)
- Education: University of Lyon
- Profession: Jurist

Blandine Brocard (French pronunciation: [blɑ̃din bʁɔkaʁ]; born 3 November 1981) is a French politician of the Democratic Movement (MoDem) who was elected to the National Assembly in the 2017 legislative election, representing Rhône's 5th constituency. She is formerly affiliated with La République En Marche!, which she left in 2020.

== Political career ==
From 2014 to 2017 Brocard was a deputy mayor of Saint-Germain-au-Mont-d'Or. In the 2017 legislative election, she ran for La République En Marche! and defeated outgoing deputy Philippe Cochet of The Republicans in the 5th constituency of Rhône with 60.2% of the second-round vote.

In Parliament, Brocard has served on the Committee on Foreign Affairs (2017), the Committee on Social Affairs (2017–2020) and the Committee on Laws (2020–present). In late 2020, Brocard left the LREM group and instead joined the MoDem group. She was re-elected in the 2022 and 2024 elections.

In 2026, Brocard was second on the list for the Senate in Rhône led by Bernard Fialaire of the Radical Party.

== Political positions ==
In October 2017, Brocard joined forces with Éric Alauzet to call for a moratorium on the government's plans for extending vaccination requirements for young children.

In July 2019, she decided not to align with her parliamentary group's majority and became one of 52 LREM members who abstained from a vote on the French ratification of the European Union's Comprehensive Economic and Trade Agreement (CETA) with Canada.

In September 2019, Brocard voted against the party line and opposed new rules on providing access to assisted reproductive technology (ART) to all women.

In July 2026, she supported the appointment of François-Noël Buffet of The Republicans as Defender of Rights by President Emmanuel Macron.
