= The Reformers =

French political party faction

The Reformers (Les Réformateurs) is a libertarian and liberal faction within The Republicans, formerly called the Union for a Popular Movement (UMP).

The Reformers supported laissez-faire and a free market economy. It is led by Hervé Novelli and most members of it come from Liberal Democracy, a right-liberal party which merged into the UMP in 2002. Many of its members are also close supporters of Nicolas Sarkozy within the party.

== Members ==
- Philippe Auberger
- Jean Auclair
- Jean-Claude Beaulieu
- Marc Bernier
- René Bouin
- Loïc Bouvard
- Philippe Briand
- Jacques Briat
- Bernard Brochand
- Chantal Brunel
- Dominique Caillaud
- François Calvet
- Bernard Carayon
- Olivier Carré
- Luc Chatel
- Gérard Cherpion
- Jean-Louis Christ
- Philippe Cochet
- Édouard Courtial
- Paul-Henri Cugnenc
- Olivier Dassault
- Bernard Deflesselles
- Lucien Degauchy
- Francis Delattre
- Jean-Jacques Descamps
- Patrick Devedjian
- Jacques Domergue
- Jean-Pierre Door
- Gérard Dubrac
- Yannick Favennec
- Daniel Fidelin
- Jean-Michel Fourgous
- Claude Gatignol
- Bruno Gilles
- Maurice Giro
- Louis Giscard d'Estaing
- Claude Goasguen
- François-Michel Gonnot
- Jean-Pierre Gorges
- François Goulard
- Claude Greff
- Arlette Grosskost
- Louis Guédon
- Jean-Jacques Guillet
- Sébastien Huyghe
- Édouard Jacque
- Aimé Kergueris
- Pierre Lang
- Marc Le Fur
- Pierre Lellouche
- Jean-Claude Lenoir
- Jean-Louis Léonard
- Lionnel Luca
- Daniel Mach
- Alain Madelin
- Richard Mallié
- Hervé Mariton
- Fernand Siré
- Christian Vanneste
- Philippe Vitel
- Gérard Longuet
- Hervé Novelli

Alain Madelin, the leader of Liberal Democracy and former deputy, was also a notable member of the club. Jean-Pierre Gorges left the club in 2006.
