= Richard Texier =

French painter and sculptor (born 1955)

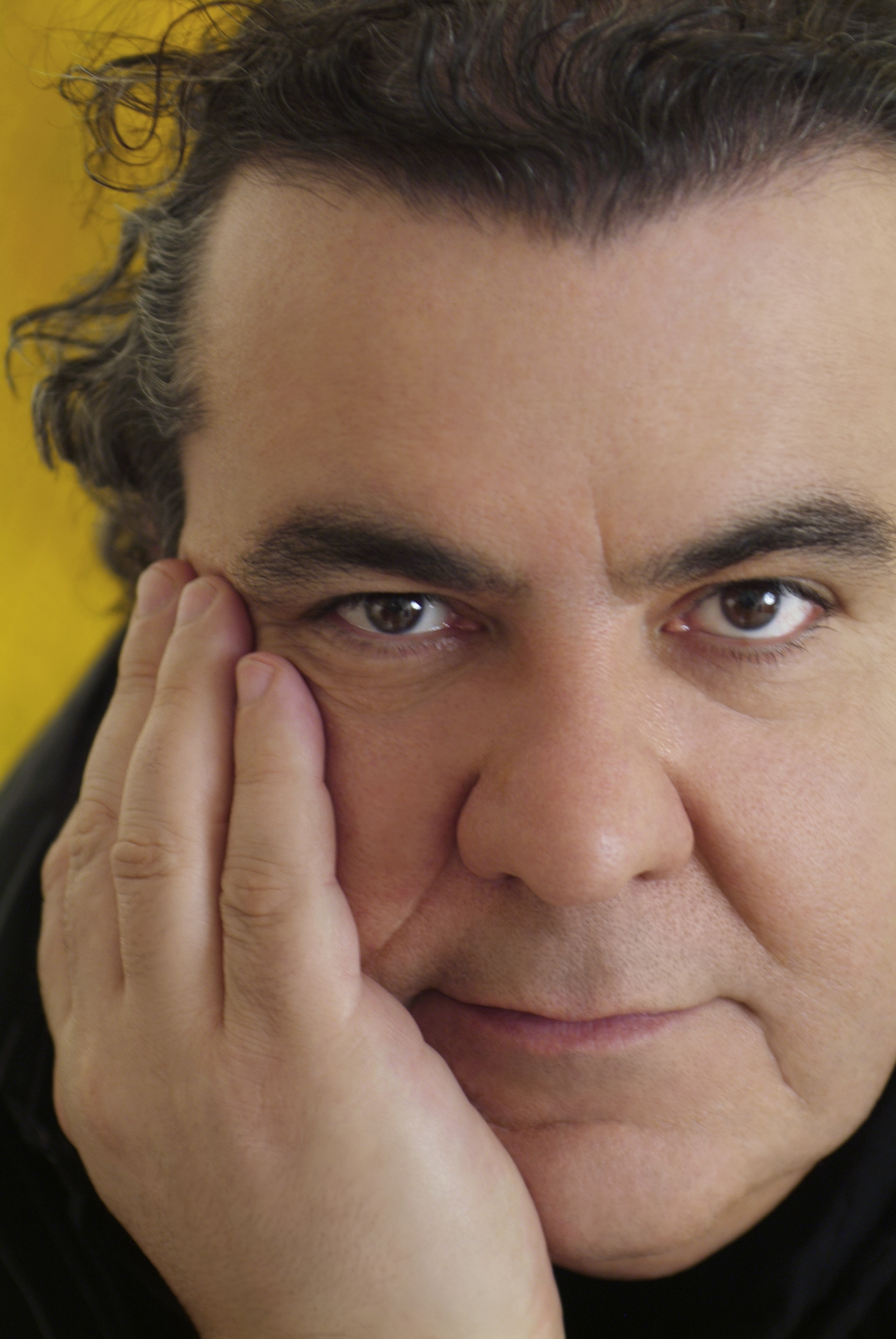
Portrait of Richard Texier

Richard Texier (born 28 June 1955) is a French painter and sculptor. He lives and works in Paris.

== Biography ==
Texier spent his childhood in the Poitevin region of Western France. In 1973, Texier went to college in Paris. He graduated with a degree in art and architecture from the École spéciale d'architecture and later received a doctorate in plastic art from the Sorbonne.

In 1979, Texier moved to New York City, where he initiated a nomadic strategy of creation which he called "Nomadic Workshops". This strategy subsequently enabled him to multiply his workshop space to venues all over the world:

- 1992: House of Culture, Moscow, Russia
- 1993: Manufacture des œillets, Ivry-sur-Seine, France
- 1998: Villa Noailles, Hyères, France
- 2002: Starrett-Lehigh Building, Chelsea, New York City
- 2003: Tour de Cordouan (Cordouan Lighthouse), France
- 2004: Liu Foundry, Shanghai, China
- 2012: Rangoon, Burma

In 1982, Texier exhibited for the first time at the Foire Internationale d'Art Contemporain in Paris with the Claudine Bréguet gallery.

In 1989, the French government commissioned Texier to create a series of tapestries on the theme of the 1789 Declaration of the Rights of Man and of the Citizen to celebrate the 200th anniversary of the French Revolution. The tapestries were exhibited at the Opéra Bastille, La Grande Arche de la Défense, the National Assembly of France, the International Tapestry Museum in Aubusson, France, the European Parliament and the Musée du Luxembourg in Paris.

Texier's most recent works include Chaosmos 2009, Pantheo Vortex 2011, and Elastogénèse 2013.

Chaosmos

In 2009, Texier began a series of special paintings entitled Chaosmos. This ongoing work includes more than a hundred paintings. The word Chaosmos was first used in 1939 by James Joyce in Finnegans Wake, whereby he states that the universe cannot function without embracing the concept of chaos. Moreover, the cosmos and chaos are indissolubly united in a vast continuum of order and disorder. At the beginning of the 1970s, Gilles Deleuze and Félix Guattari revisited the Joycian cosmos, notably in their "Mille Plateaux", affirming that "chaos is not the opposite of rhythm, it is more the center of all centers". It is literally this center of all centers that Texier, as an artistic astrophysicist attempts to define, and restore. Chaosmos is none other than a celebration of energy as a concentration of the history of the world. Zéno Bianu « une autre entrée dans le cœur du monde », p. 52, Art press No. 413, "Supplément Richard Texier", July–August 2014, ISSN 0245-5676

Pantheo-Vortex

- « Pantheo Vortex is a collection of paintings begun in 2011. The series is based on the principle of The Cathedral of Rouen by Monet, or by the limitless modern artistic propositions of a conceptual nature. The paintings in this series are both photos and paintings. The image is obtained by using a digital graphic palette and aims to confuse by placing the real in the false and vice versa. The intention is not to trouble or perplex but rather to inspire and encourage the viewer to look beyond simple appearances. The choice of "vortex" in the naming of the work is explicit. According to the dictionary definition a vortex is a human pictorial interpretation which enables the viewer, via IT, to formulate a description of the infinite, and that of mystery.» (…) »

Citation de Paul Ardenne « faire de l’essentiel une œuvre d’art à la mesure », p. 14, in Art press No. 413, "Supplément Richard Texier", July–August 2014, ISSN 0245-5676

- « Ce projet [Pantheo-Vortex] est une stratégie de création pour aborder le mystère et la dimension magique de l’existence. (…) L’art est le seul espace non dogmatique, non religieux où il semble possible d’aborder un sujet qui se dérobe, par définition, aux tentatives d’exploration. (…) »

Citation de Richard Texier, p. 12, in Art press No. 413, "Supplément Richard Texier", July–August 2014, ISSN 0245-5676

Elastogénèse

- «(…) This new series explores the elasticity of the imaginary, the emptiness of the early times of consciousness and cosmos, where all is real as the world invents itself. I baptised it Elastogénèse as it is firstly an artistic rendering of dreams, Yves Tanguy never called it that even if he used it frequently. It is also a tool, a means of embracing reality. It is very different from the virtual world which attempts to dematerialise reality, Elastogénèse on the contrary chooses matter. It is, however something soft, elastic, in motion and restless. This form of movement exists already in nature, and these natural elements prove in a dazzling manner that the soft is stronger than the hard, and that the proof of their elastic, changeable and adaptable nature is finally more elegant than the rigidity of the real.(…) The art world was the first to discover and explore this nature. The sculptures of Arp, the soft watches of Dali, the expansions of Cèsar, and the silicons of Matthew Barney are all intuitive versions I offer a principal of mental resolution, a means of magical thinking.(…)»

Citation de Richard Texier, dans Nager, p. 129-130, a story, published by Éditions Gallimard in Collection Blanche, Paris, ISBN 978-2-07-014962-9.

=== Distinctions ===
- Officier of the Ordre National du Mérite May 2016
- Chevalier de l'Ordre des Arts et des Lettres July 2014
- Peintre officiel de la Marine titulaire en 2015

== Works ==
=== Selected personal exhibitions ===
- 1982: FIAC, Gallery Claudine Bréguet, Paris, France
- 1983: Exhibition Space, Leo Castelli, 112 Greene Street, New York City, United States
- 1985: Gallery Kouros, Madison Avenue, New York City, United States
- 1985: Exhibition at the museum of fine art of La Rochelle & Sainte-Croix museum, Poitiers, France
- 1986: "Richard Texier: el continente de la peonza", Museo Casa Natal de Jovellanos, Gijón, Spain
- 1986: La Roche-sur-Yon museum, France
- 1987: Sawaya & Moroni, Milan, Italy
- 1988: Galerie Lea Gredt, Luxembourg
- 1988: Gallery of Applied Arts, New York City, United States
- 1989: Galeria Ciento, Barcelona, Spain
- 1991: "Territoires nomades" at the Musée des beaux-arts d'Angers, France
- 1992: Galerie Mobile & Galerie Hadrien- Thomas, Paris, France
- 1992: "Moscou 92" VDNKh in Moscow, Russia
- 1992: "Histoire du Ciel", Galleria La Bussola, Turin, Italy
- 1992: Contemporary Art Center of Moscow, Russia
- 1993: The Botanique museum, Brussels, Belgium
- 1994: Gallery Nii Osaka, Japan
- 1994: Château de Chambord, France
- 1994: Institut français de Taipei, Taiwan
- 1994: Galleria Grafica Tokyo, Japan
- 1995: the Bouvet-Ladubay Contemporary Art Center, Saumur, France
- 1995: Gallery Garando Nagoya, Japan
- 1995: Gianni Piretti Gallery, Stockholm Art Fair, Stockholm, Sweden
- 1996: Museum of Fine Art of Taiwan, Taipei
- 1996: Manufacture des œillets, Ivry-sur-Seine, France
- 1996: Galerie Virus, Antwerp, Belgium
- 1997: Galerie Reflex, Amsterdam, Netherlands
- 1997: Suzanne Tarasiève, Barbizon, France
- 1998: Feria Internacional de Arte Contemporáneo, Madrid, Spain
- 1998: Musée national de la Marine, Palais de Chaillot, Paris, France
- 1999: Carrousel du Louvre, Art Paris Art Fair, Paris, France
- 1999: Villa Noailles, Hyères, France
- 2000: "Sculptures", Galerie Artcurial, Paris, France
- 2001: Galerie J. Bastien Art, Brussels, Belgium
- 2002: "Suite des droits de l'homme", 7 Aubusson tapistries, Musée du Président-Jacques-Chirac, France
- 2002: "Nomadic Atelier", Gallery Atelier 14, New York City, United States
- 2004: "Les îles de la destinée", Galerie Tessa Herold, ARCO, Madrid, Spain
- 2004: Creation of 8 stained glass windows, Abbaye d'art de Trizay, Trizay, France
- 2005: Fine art museum of Shanghai (Shanghai Meishu Guan), China
- 2006: "5 large bronze sculptures", Grand Palais, Paris
- 2007: “Opere recenti”, Galleria San Carlo, Milan, Italy,
- 2007: "Paintings on Chinese Nautical Charts - New York by Richard Texier", Alice King Gallery, Hong Kong
- 2008: "Créatures mythiques", M Art Center of Shanghai, China
- 2011: "Theoria Sacra", Galerie Pierre Levy, Paris
- 2013: 11 monumental sculptures Orchard Road, Singapore
- 2014: "Pantheo-Vortex", Gallery Guy Pieters, Saint-Paul-de-Vence, France
- 2019: "Light", Galerie Downtown, Paris, France

=== Publications ===
- 1979 : Constructions d’après nature, a work in three parts edited with the participation of the National Center for Contemporary Art of France.
- 1981 : Lune, l’autre le paysage, a publication in three periods.
  - 1: Research and technical approach to landscape
  - 2 : Precise verified astronomy and representation of the lunar cycle
  - 3: Presentation of various attitudes, installations, and representations in landscape
- 1983 : Petit Précis cosmographique, a collection composed of 12 celestial diagrams
- 2015 : Pantheo Vortex, a portfolio of photographs by Richard Texier, with a text by Catherine Millet, Art Press editions and Eric Higgins
- 2015 : Nager, story, published by Gallimard, collection Blanche, Paris, ISBN 978-2-07-014962-9.
- 2017: The Big M, roman publié chez Gallimard, collection Blanche, Paris, (ISBN 978-2-07-270200-6)
- 2018: Theirs, publié chez Gallimard, collection Blanche, Paris, (ISBN 978-2-07-279172-7)
- 2018: Manifesto of Elastogenesis, publié chez Éditions Fata Morgana, (ISBN 978-2-37792-030-3)
- 2019: The glowworm hypothesis, publié chez Gallimard, collection Blanche, Paris, (ISBN 978-2-07-285279-4)

=== Films ===
- 2008 : Rouge très très fort on the works of Zao Wou-Ki, available on DVD by éditions Biro and aired on ARTE
- 2013 : The Death of Cleopatra, Youtube and aired on France2
- 2013 : Gabrielle d'Estrée, Youtube
- 2015 : Le signe Nomade, documentary on Farid Belkahia available on DVD

=== Selected public works ===
The Tools of the Navigator

In 1996, a monumental chariot on the site of l'Arsenal de Rochefort-sur-Mer, à deux pas de la Corderie royale, including a sextant, a coil of rope, and a turn pin.

The Spirit of Time

In 2005, a monumental sculpture on the pediment of the K.WAH center in Shanghai, 1010 Huaihai Zhong Lu, China

Angel Bear

In 2015, a special commission by the SNCF for the COP21, Angel Bear is permanently installed on the place Napoleon III in front of the railway station of Paris Nord. It was while reading a report in Paris Match on the plight of polar bears that Richard Texier was inspired to create the work.

Representing a winged bear of 7 meters in height and weighing 4.8 tons, the statue invites passers by to reflect upon the dangers facing our planet.
It is a mythological and hybrid creature delivering a political and ecological message on the fragility of our planet and the importance of COP21.

Unicorna Celeste

In 2016, Richard Texier receives two commissions for bronze sculptures, of which one,Unicorna Céleste will decorate the garden of the new building "Esprit Sagan" in Paris. IUnicorna Celeste is an evocation of Françoise Sagans’ Le Cheval Evanoui.

== Selected bibliography ==
=== Hors-Série Magazines ===
- Art press N° 413, "Supplément Richard Texier", July–August 2014, ISSN 0245-5676
- Beaux Arts Magazine Hors Série, "Richard Texier Œuvres récentes", July 2008, ISBN 978-2-84278-643-4
- Connaissance des arts Hors Série N° 222, "Richard Texier, l'arpenteur des rêves", 2004, ISBN 978-2-903808-01-3

=== Selected Monographs and books on Richard Texier ===
- Zéno Bianu, Eric Fottorino, Sylvie Germain, Jean-Marie Laclavetine & Denis Montebello, "Richard Texier - Territoire d'hybridation", Éditions Palantines, 2014, ISBN 978-2-35678-099-7
- Henri Belbéoch, "Les ateliers nomades - Richard Texier", text by Michel Butor & Daniel Pennac, Éditions Palantines, 2012, ISBN 978-2-35678-085-0
- Zéno Bianu & Pascal Bonafoux, "Richard Texier Sculptures", Éditions du Patrimoine, Centre des monuments nationaux, 2011, ISBN 978-2-7577-0168-3
- Jean-Marie Laclavetine, "Richard Texier, Œuvres récentes", Éditions Le Temps qu'il fait, 2007, ISBN 978-2-86853-499-6
- Gérard de Cortanze, "Richard Texier, La route du Levant - L'œuvre gravé", Somogy éditions d'art, 2006, ISBN 978-2-85056-968-5
- Daniel Pennac, "Richard Texier - De l'abondance au Zénith", Flammarion, 2004, ISBN 978-2-08-011321-4
- Kenneth White, "Richard Texier - Atlantic Latitude", Éditions Palantines, 2001 ISBN 978-2-911434-18-1
- Patrick Grainville, "Richard Texier", Éditions de la Différence, 2e édition revue et augmentée 1999, ISBN 978-2-7291-1274-5
- Jean-Marie del Moral, "Richard Texier", Éditions Aaltus Cassendi, 1991, ISBN 2-9503946-2-0
- Christine Buci-Glucksmann, Philippe Carteron, Michel Cassé & Michel Enrici, "Richard Texier Peintures 1989-1990", Éditions Aaltus Cassendi, 1990 ISBN 2-9503946-2-0

=== Selected Exhibition Catalogs ===
- Collectif, "Richard Texier - Exposition à la Galerie Pierre Levy", Biro éditeur, 2011, ISBN 978-2-35119-094-4
- Philippe Le Guillou, "Richard Texier - Theoria sacra", Éditions Le temps qu'il fait, 2008, ISBN 978-2-86853-514-6
- Zao Wou-Ki & Daniel Pennac, "Richard Texier - Créatures Mythiques", Edited by M Art Center Shanghai, 2008,
- Alice King Gallery, "Paintings on chinese nautical charts - Richard Texier", Alisan Fine Arts, 2007, ISBN 978-988-99761-2-5
- Martina Corgnati, "Richard Texier, Opere recenti", Edited by Galleria San Carlo Milan, 2007
- "L'Ouest céleste" Edited by the Museum of fine Art Shanghai, 2005 ASIN B00BQALKH0
- Serge Raffy, "Richard Texier, Les îles de la destinée", Edited by Galerie Thessa Herold, 2004
- Marie Lavandier & François Haquin, "Les droits de l'homme - Richard Texier", Éditions du musée du président Jacques Chirac, 2001, ISBN 2-9515809-2-4
- Alexandre Grenier, "Homo Stella: Le nouveau système du monde", Edited by Galerie Thessa Herold, 2001
- François Carrassan & Daniel Dobbels, "Richard Texier à la Villa Noailles", Éditions Plume, 1999, ISBN 2-84110-104-5
- Jean Pierre Verdet, "Richard Texier, Le centre, le cercle et la périphérie", Éditions Le temps qu'il fait, 1998, ISBN 2-86853-299-3
- Emmanuel de Fontainieu & Préface d'Erik Orsenna, "Richard Texier, Les outils du navigateur",Éditions Le temps qu'il fait, 1998, ISBN 2-86853-299-3
- "Richard Texier - Peintures Récentes 1996", Edited by Galerie Virus Antwerp, 1996
- Catherine de Braeckeleer, Victor Miziano, Leonid Bajanov & Stéphane Penxten, "Richard Texier - Moscou' 92", Le Botanique Éditions, 1993
- Jean-Louis Giovannoni, "Richard Texier, Sculptures", Les Éditions du Cinq, 1993
- Denis Montebello, "Richard Texier ou Le droit d'épave", Éditions Le temps qu'il fait, 1989, ISBN 2-86853-075-3
- Bertrand Gibert, "Richard Texier", Edited by Lea Gredt, Luxembourg, 1988
- Pierre Restany, Peter Frank, "Richard Texier- Codex Mira", Edited by the Sainte-Croix de Poitiers, Donjon de Niort, la Rochelle & la Roche sur Yon museums, 1985
- Cherry Barbier & J-L Chalumeau, "Richard Texier - Mutus Luner", Simon Chaput Editor, 1983

=== Selected Illustrated Books ===
- 1988: C'est comme ça, Georges-L. Godeau, Éditions Le dé bleu / Le Castor astral, ISBN 978-2-900768-68-6
- 1989: La Danse, suivi de Débris reconstruits, Lokenath Bhattacharya, French text by Franck-André Jamme, Éditions Festina Lente
- 1989: "Les Chambres de l’œil", Franck André Jamme, Éditions Fata Morgana
- 1990: Bois de lune, Franck André Jamme, Éditions Fata Morgana, ISBN 978-2-85194-235-7
- 1990: Une petite affaire un peu spirituelle, Franck-André Jamme, Éditions SLM
- 1992: Pas japonais, Jean-Louis Giovannoni, Éditions Unes
- 1992: Le Roi du bois, Pierre Michon, Éditions Infernales
- 1994: Nicolas de Staël, André Du Bouchet, Éditions Au Fil de l’Encre
- 1996: L’horizon est plus grand, Patrick Deville, Éditions Le Petit Jaunais
- 1996: Le Navire poulpe, Gilbert Lascault, Éditions Le Petit Jaunais
- 1998: Traité des possibles, Zéno Bianu, Éditions Fata Morgana
- 1998: Se noyer en eau sèche, Salah Stétié, Éditions R.L.D.
- 1999: Codex oceanicus, Kenneth White, Éditions R.L.D.
- 1999: Rêves, Ernst Jünger, Éditions Fata Morgana, ISBN 978-2-85194-481-8
- 2001: Ex-voto, Richard Texier, Éditions R.L.D.
- 2001: Fugue, Zéno Bianu, Éditions Maeght
- 2002: Pierre ouverte, Zéno Bianu, Éditions R.L.D.
- 2002: Exercices d’aimantation, Zéno Bianu, Éditions Les Petits Classiques du grand pirate
- 2003: In situ, Richard Texier, Éditions R.L.D.
- 2003: Une bouteille à la mer, Gérard Macé, Édition Les Presses de Sérendip
- 2006: L’Ouest céleste, Isabelle Autissier, Éditions R.L.D.
- 2012: Éloge des survivants, Zéno Bianu, Éditions Les Cahiers du Museur

== Documentaries ==
=== Radio ===
"Nager - Richard Texier" Livres et vous, France Bleu, 17 August 2015
""Nager" de Richard Texier par la librairie Comme un roman à Paris" Le Temps des libraires, France Culture, 30 June 2015
"L'amour des commencements" Carnet Nomade, France Culture, 20 June 2015
"Création" Le temps des écrivains, France Culture, 20 June 2015
"Social Club" Social club, Europe 1, 3 June 2015
"Social Club" Social club, Europe 1, 15 September 2014
"Richard Texier, un artiste nomade" Culture Vive, RFI, mercredi 9 May 2012

=== Video ===
"Rencontre avec Richard Texier" Festival de Saintes, Connaissance des Arts, 11 July 2016
"Découvrez l'immense atelier parisien du peintre Richard Texier" LostParadise, Huffington Post, 3 June 2016
"Histoire de l'oeuvre Angel Bear par Richard Texier" YouTube, SNCF Gares & Connexions, 4 February 2016
"Richard Texier au travail" Documentaire, Benoit Labourdette, 7 October 2014
"Barbara Polla nous passionne pour Richard Texier et Pascal Convert" YouTube, Ouvre tes yeux, 5 July 2014
"Chaosmos" Documentaire, Benoit Labourdette, 18 June 2014
"Peinture" YouTube, Richard Texier, 17 March 2014
"A Poitiers et Niort" CULTURE T, Public Sénat, 19 April 2013
"Les Ailes" Documentaire, Benoit Labourdette, 11 July 2011
"Expo Richard Texier au Département de Seine-Maritime" Dailymotion, J'aime Département de Seine-Maritime, 26 June 2008
"Les tapisseries des droits de l'homme" Documentaire, Luc Héral, 2002
"Portrait du peintre Richard Texier" Journal de 20H, France 2, 1 June 1998 L'Arpenteur Celeste, a film by Camille Guichard, Production and distribution, Terra Luna Films, 1991
