= Philippe Cochet =

French politician (born 1961)

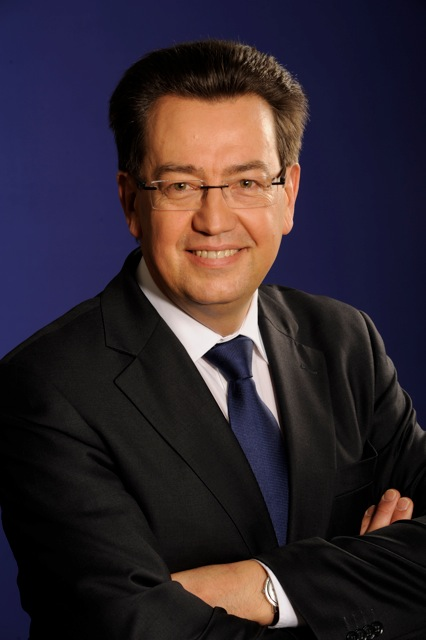

Member of the Metropolitan Council of Lyon
- In office 1 January 2015 – 16 July 2025

Mayor of Caluire-et-Cuire
- In office 16 March 2008 – 16 July 2025

Member of the National Assembly for Rhône's 5th constituency
- In office 19 June 2002 – 20 June 2017
- Preceded by: Jean Rigaud
- Succeeded by: Blandine Brocard

Personal details
- Born: 23 May 1961 (age 64) Lyon, France
- Party: Republican Party (until 1997); Liberal Democracy (1997–2002); Union for a Popular Movement (2002–2015); The Republicans (2015–present)

Philippe Cochet (French pronunciation: [filip kɔʃɛ]; born 23 May 1961) is a French politician.

== Career ==
He has been a member of the French National Assembly since 2002, most recently re-elected in 2007 for the Rhône department. He is a member of the mainstream conservative party, the UMP.

He is a member of the National Assembly Committee on foreign relations, and the President of the France-Iran Parliamentary Committee.

Within the UMP, Philippe Cochet is part of the libertarian faction called The Reformers. He has been one of the 21 members of the UMP National Committee (Comité directeur) since July 2007.

He is also, since March 2008, the mayor of Caluire-et-Cuire, a city in the Northern suburbs of Lyon.

== Political positions ==
Cochet was a notable opponent to the 2013 legalisation of same-sex marriage under a government bill presented by Justice Minister Christiane Taubira; he supported La Manif pour tous. He used controversial language in the National Assembly, accusing the government of "assassinating children". He later said the term was "not appropriate", but maintained the government would be "weakening children".
