= Léon Couturier =

French painter (1842–1935)

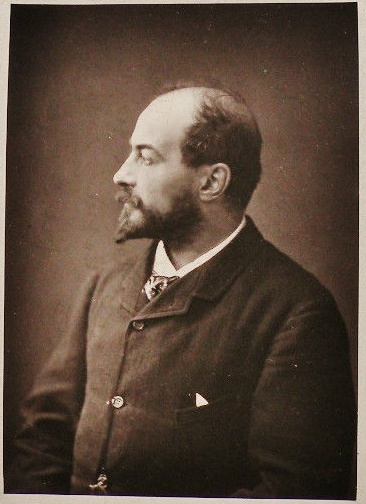
Photograph by Ferdinand Mulnier (1817-1891)

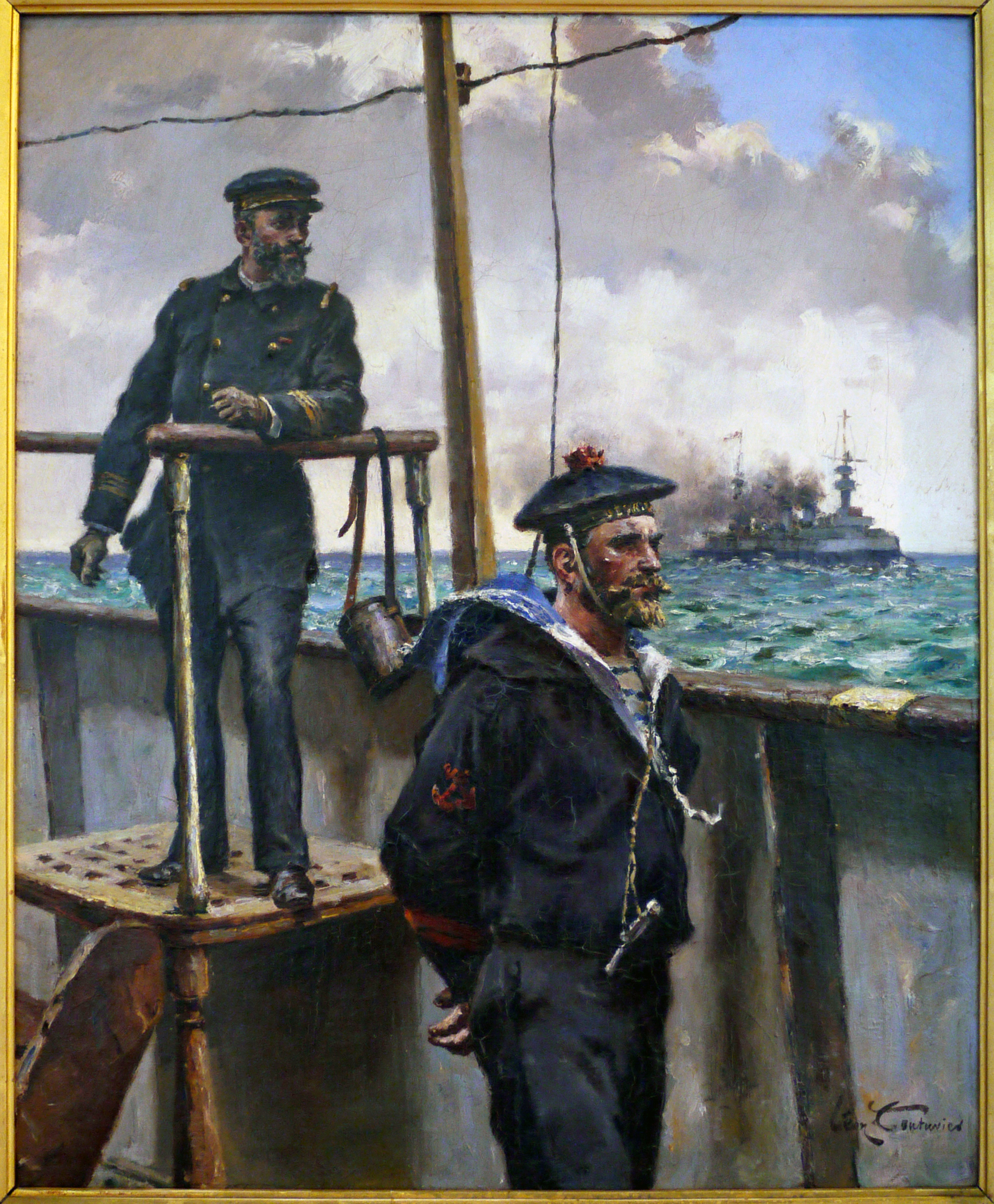
On the Bridge (date unknown)

Léon Antoine Lucien Couturier (French pronunciation: [leɔ̃ ɑ̃twan lysjɛ̃ kutyʁje]; 29 December 1842 in Mâcon – 21 December 1935 in Neuilly-sur-Seine) was a French painter in the naturalistic style, who specialized in maritime and military subjects.

== Biography ==
His father was a merchant. He was originally admitted to the École nationale des beaux-arts de Lyon in 1860, then moved to Paris in 1864 to serve an apprenticeship in the studios of Alexandre Cabanel. In the Franco-Prussian War, he helped defend the barricades during the Siege of Paris. This experience inspired his first series of paintings devoted to military life. A holiday in North Africa inspired a similar series of works devoted to the Colonial Troops.

Beginning in 1880, he devoted himself almost exclusively to painting the ships and sailors of the French Navy, which earned him official recognition. He was appointed a "Peintre de la Marine" ("Painter of the Navy") in 1890 and awarded the Légion d'honneur in 1897. Later, he sketched the French soldiers of World War I. Towards the end of his life, he abandoned naval subjects in favor of fishing and fishermen. He exhibited regularly at the Salon.

He also worked as an illustrator, contributing to three volumes of poetry by "Yann Nibor" (Jean Albert Robin, 1857-1947), "The Sailor Poet" of Brittany; La Marine Française by the military historian Maurice Loir (1893) and La Guerre Fatale France-Angleterre by "Capitaine Dirant" (Émile Driant, 1900, 2 vols.). Also adept at engraving, he reproduced many of his works to be distributed as lithographs. One of his more unusual projects involved designing menus for the official dinner hosted by President Félix Faure in honor of Tsar Nicholas II and the Tsarina in 1896. Several illustrations in anarchist publications of the 1900s (including Les Temps Nouveaux of Jean Grave) are attributed to him, but that is generally believed to be incorrect, or they were used without permission.
