= Pierre Bodard =

French painter (1881–1937)

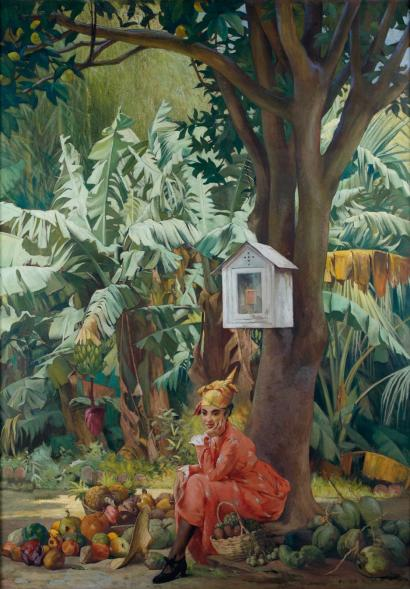
Tropical Flora

Pierre Bodard (15 April 1881 – 18 June 1937) was a French painter, best known for his scenes depicting the West Indies.

== Biography ==
He began his studies at the School of Fine Arts in his native Bordeaux with Paul François Quinsac and continued at the École des Beaux-Arts with Gabriel Ferrier. In 1909, he was awarded the Prix de Rome for his depiction of Ceres saving the life of a child. While at the French Academy in Rome, he studied with Carolus-Duran and Paul-Albert Besnard. From Rome, he travelled throughout the Mediterranean, visiting North Africa, Greece, Turkey and Spain; all the while sketching and painting.

He was mobilized in 1915, stationed on Martinique, and married in Fort-de-France. As a result, he did not return to Paris until 1920. He remained emotionally attached to the island for the rest of his life, and was an active participant in events and exhibitions related to the "Outre Mer", notably the 1931 Paris Colonial Exposition.

He was an Associate of the Society of French Artists and exhibited regularly at the Salon from 1908 to 1932. In addition to his paintings of the West Indies, he created scenes from the Basque Country. After many years as a history and genre painter, he gradually focused on orientalist and marine painting, as well as portraits.

In 1921, he was officially named a "Peintre de la Marine". Five years later, he was awarded the Ordre des Palmes Académiques (Silver Palm). In 1933, he received the Gold Palm. He died in Paris in 1937.
