= François Nardi =

French painter

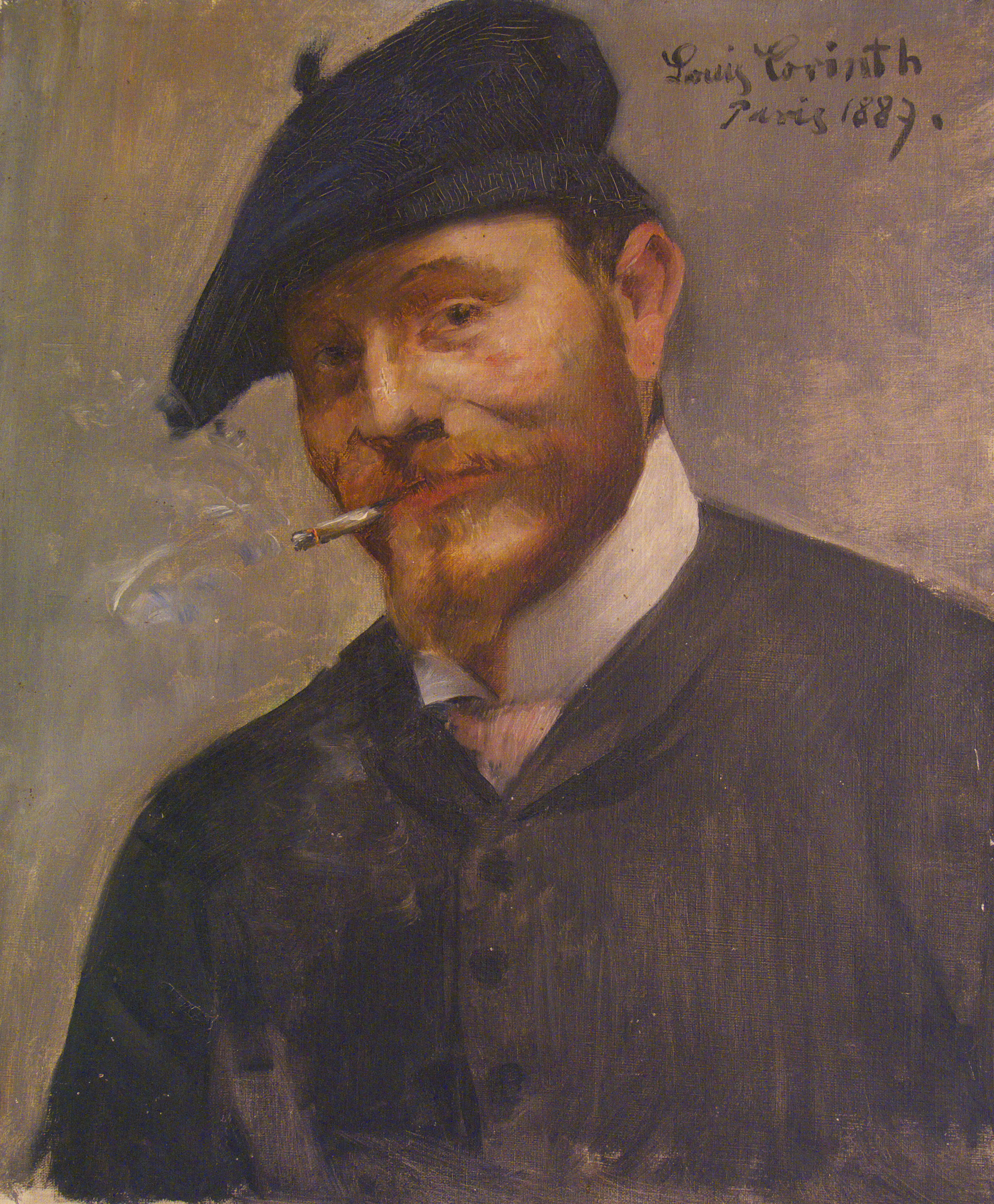
François Nardi; portrait by Lovis Corinth (1887)

François Nardi (7 December 1861, Nice – 28 November 1936, Toulon) was a French painter of Italian heritage who specialized in maritime scenes.

== Biography ==
His parents were Italian immigrants from Campi Bisenzio, near Florence. He displayed an early talent for art and left the family's millinery business to paint in the countryside. There, he was noticed by Frédéric Montenard, the noted Provençal painter, who was impressed with his work and encouraged him to study in Paris.

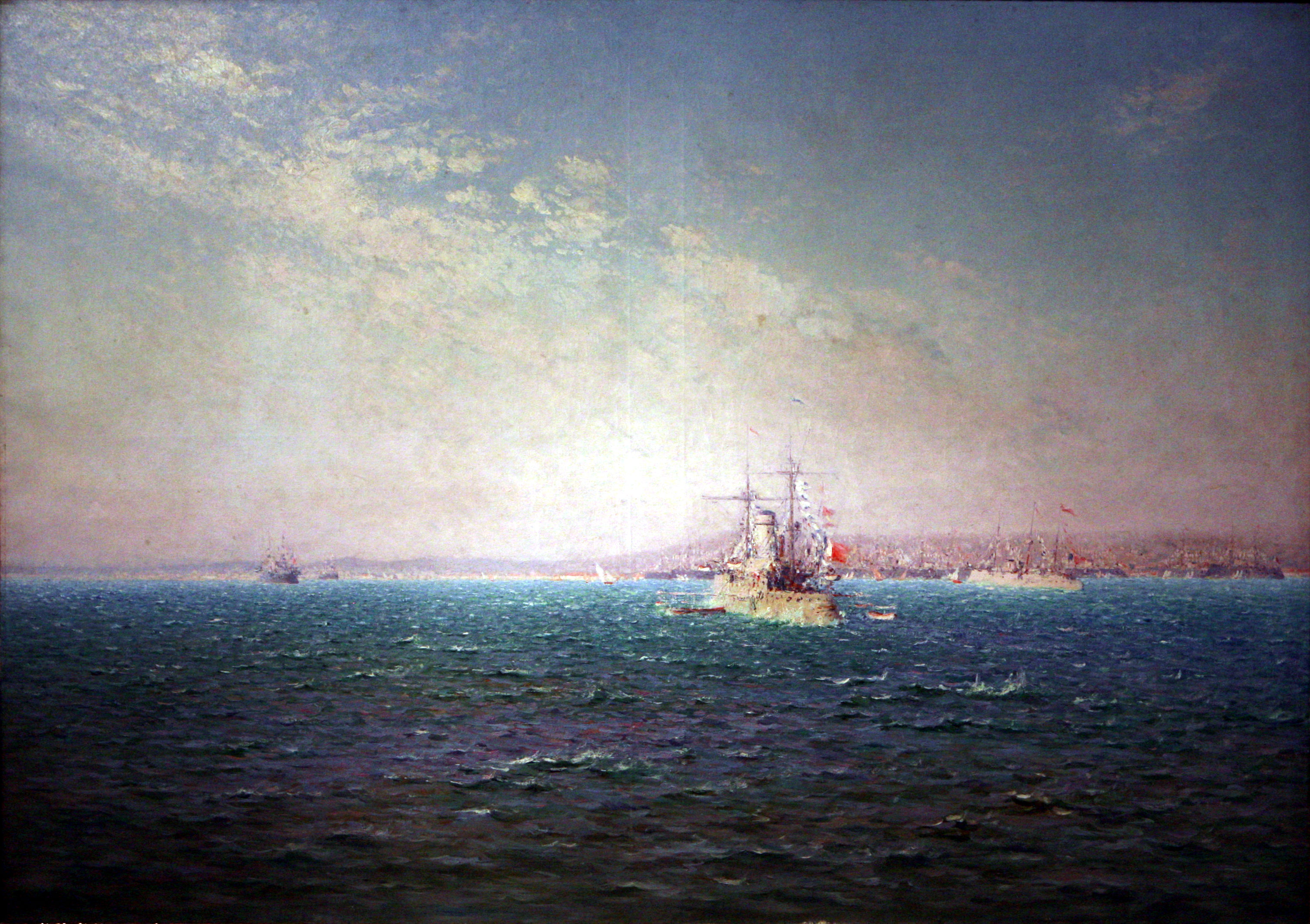
Squadron in Toulon Harbor, Mistral Effect (1895)

In 1887, he enrolled at the Académie Julian, where he studied with Tony Robert-Fleury. Two years later he won first prize at the Academy's exhibition and displayed his work at the Salon des Artistes Français. In 1890, his canvas "La rade de Toulon : effet de mistral" (The Harbor at Toulon, Mistral effect) was purchased by the French government and his career was launched. Over the next ten years, he was invited to participate in several international exhibitions, including the World's Columbian Exposition in Chicago.

The details of his life at this time are sketchy, but he appears to have divided his time between Toulon and his studios in Paris on Montmartre where he met with colleagues from the Académie Julian. He was especially supportive of foreign artists studying in France, such as Emanuel Phillips Fox, E. Irving Couse and Umberto Veruda. In 1891, upon the recommendation of Montenard, he accepted the well-known Brazilian painter Giovanni Battista Castagneto as a student, showing him how to brighten his palette and paint maritime subjects.

He married in 1899, but soon experienced a series of misfortunes. Both his parents died and he lost his first child in the same year. In 1907, his daughter died from scarlet fever, at age five. In 1909, he suffered an attack of hemiplegia which restricted his ability to paint, especially outside of his studio. President Jean Jaurès paid a visit during a campaign tour to offer his sympathy.

Retiring to Toulon, he lost all interest in his old associates, exhibitions and honors of any sort, although he continued to paint and give art lessons to a few selected students. He returned to Paris only once, in 1931, at the urging of his friends, to participate in a show at the Salon des Artistes Français. But, by then, he was virtually forgotten. Five years later, he died in his studio. An elementary school in Toulon has been named after him.

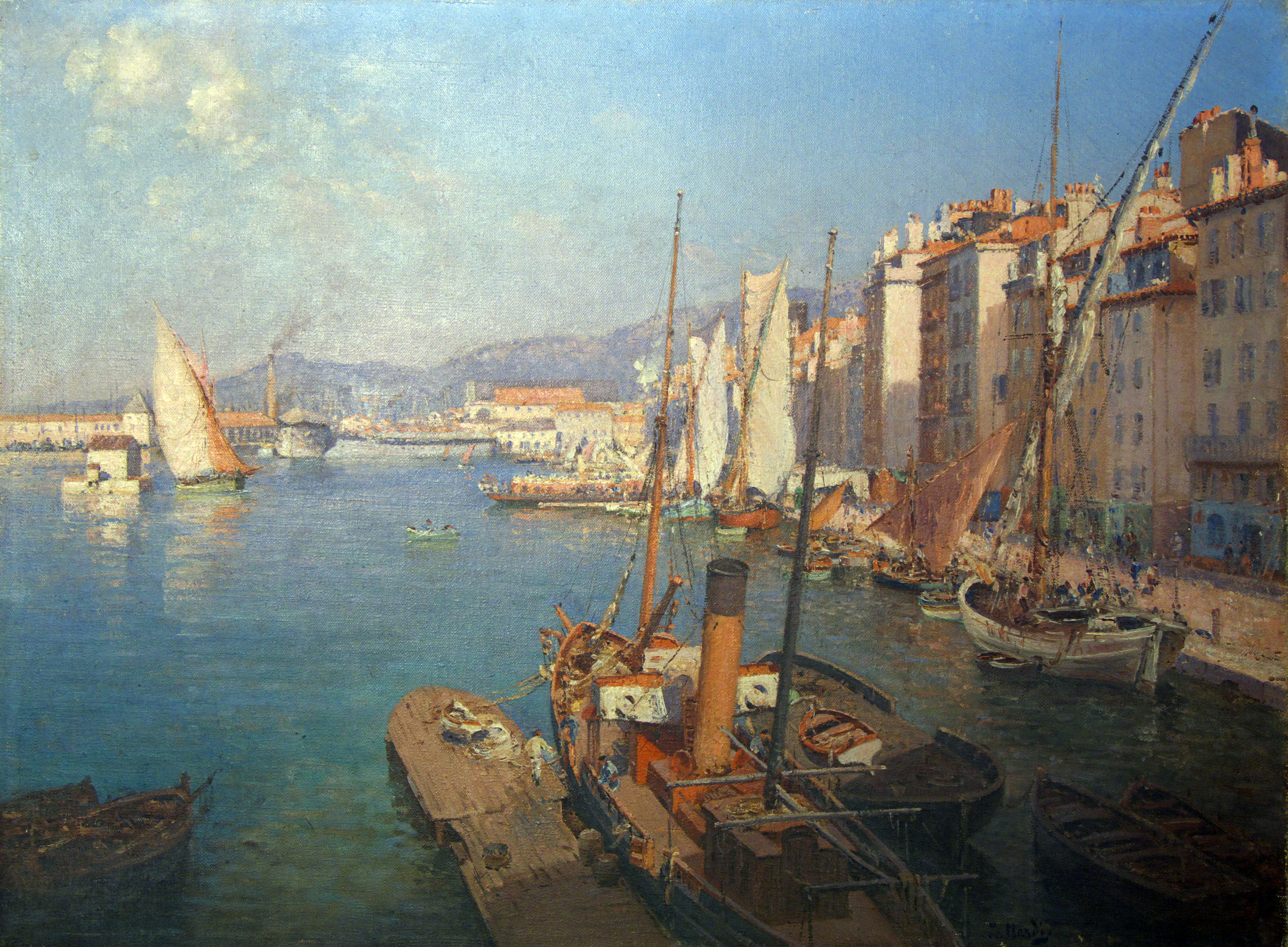
The Port of Toulon (date unknown)
