= John Pendray =

Franco-British painter

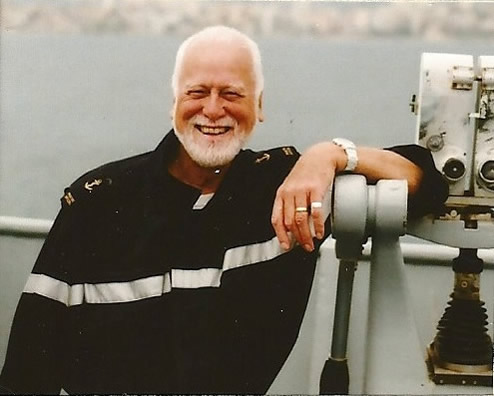
- John Pendray, Official Painter of the French Navy.
- Born: 12 July 1937 (age 89); London, England
- Education: Saint Martin's College of Art, London, University of London Institute of Pedagogy
- Known for: Painter

John Pendray (born 12 July 1937 in the city of London, England) is a Franco-British painter. Graduated from the Saint Martin School of Art and the University of London Institute of Pedagogy, he taught painting, sculpture and ceramics during 11 years. Then he moved to Marseille, France, where he first worked as an independent designer. He's a professional painter since 1990. In 2000 he obtained French nationality and, in 2001 he was appointed Official Painter of the French Navy.

== Biography ==
=== Training ===
John Pendray was born in 1937 in England. He studied Fine Art, specialising in painting at the Saint Martin School of Art in London. He completed his studies at the University of London Institute of Pedagogy obtaining his ATC (Lond). For eleven years he taught painting, sculpture and ceramics at a large London secondary school.

=== Independent Designer/Artist ===
In 1969 he met and married a young French girl from Marseille, Michèle. They left London to establish their home in Marseille, France, where he worked in design and architecture. As an independent designer/ artist he created sculptures and mural designs for the EDF state electricity company, notably establishing the chromatics and a mural design of 8000m2 for the nuclear power station at Tricastin in France. Other projects were graphics and mural designs for GDF, the state gas company. He also did graphic and mural works for three stations of the RTM, the Marseille Metro network and their headquarters building, also including design conceptions for the entire system. He did intensive interior design work for hospitals, restaurants, retirement homes, private villas and the Metro of Singapore. His work also included signalisation systems for metro train networks, power stations, festival halls and industrial research sites. His work as a perspective artist was appreciated by major architectural offices and property developers in France.

=== Painter ===
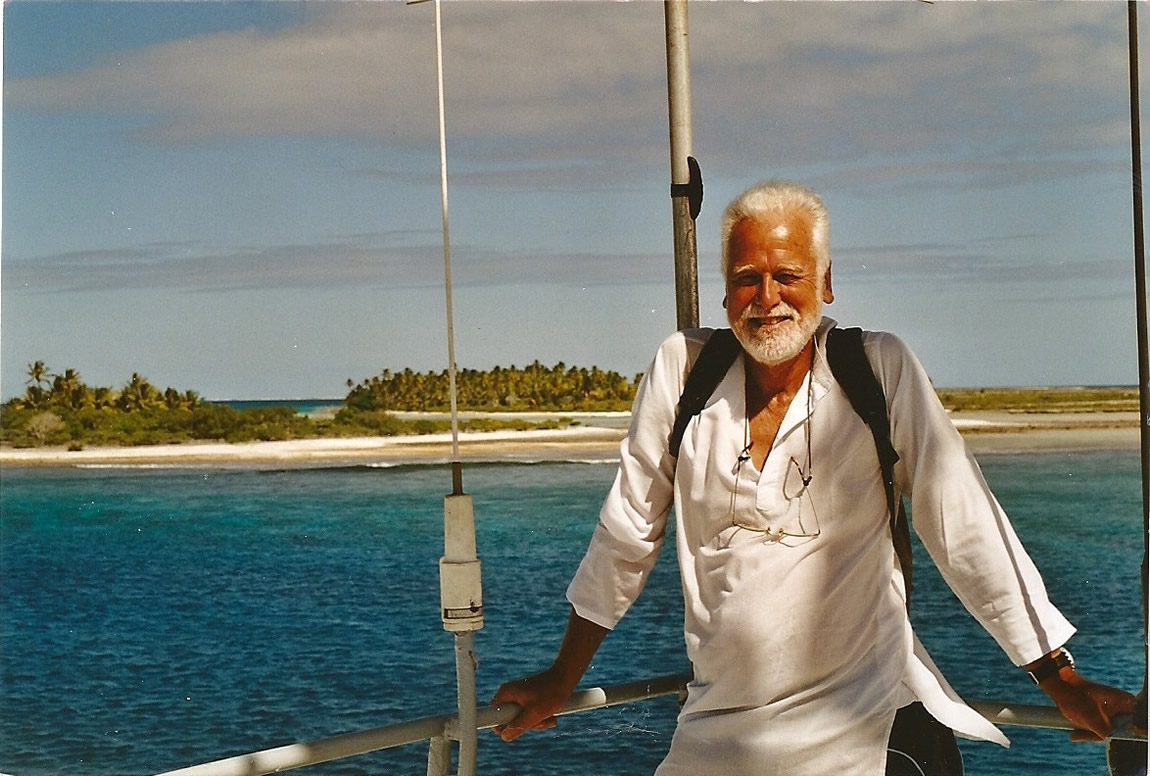
John Pendray on a boat.

In 1990 he started to paint professionally, choosing as his subject his passion since earliest childhood, boats and the sea.

In 2000 he obtained French nationality and in 2001 he was appointedOfficial Painter of the French Navy.

He now works exclusively as marine painter in his studio in Marseille. He travels extensively aboard ships of the French Navy to all oceans of the world, recording and bearing witness to the life of ships and seamen. Personal travels with his wife, Michèle to India, Canada, USA, Vietnam, Indonesia, Thailand, Egypt and North Africa are also sources of subjects for his work.

He has sailed since the age of sixteen and has always owned a sailing boat, either racing dinghies, keelboats or, as at present, a lateen rigged 'bette marseillaise' which he designed for the 'Chasse Maree' a major yachting magazine in France.

== Shows and exhibitions ==
=== Personal exhibitions ===
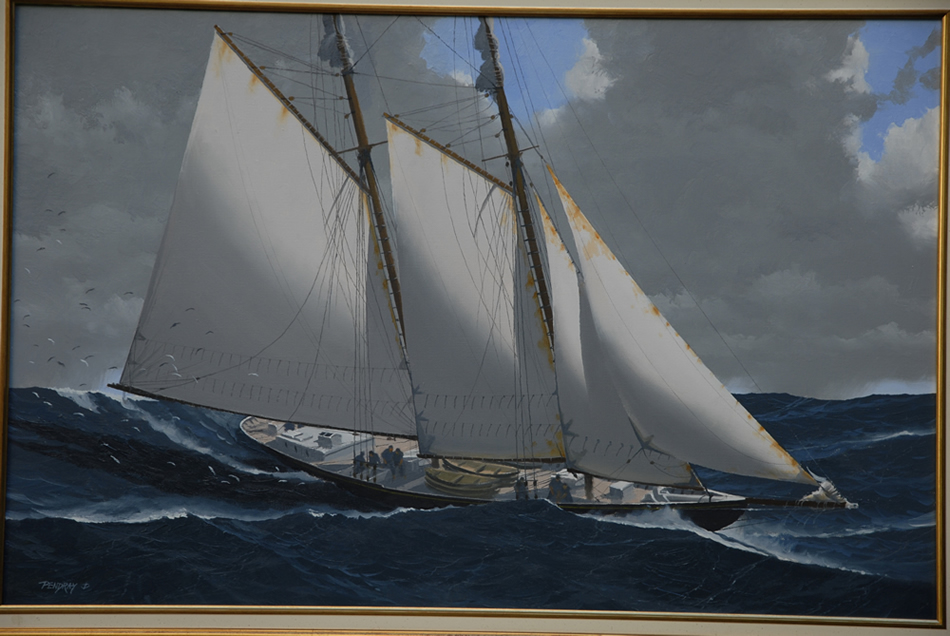
Goélette, John Pendray's painting.

- Galerie 26, place des Vosges, Paris, 2011–2012.
- Palais Bondy, Lyon, 2010.
- University of Nice, 2006.
- Villa Bagatelle, Marseille, 2003.
- Yacht Club de Monaco, 2001.
- Musée de la Marine, Saint-Tropez, 1999.
- Musée de la Tour Carrée, Sainte Maxime, 1996.
- Galerie Jeanne Laffitte, Marseille.
- Salle Pleyel, Paris.
- Yacht Club de France, Paris.
- Château de Berne, Lorgues.

=== Work exhibited ===
- Palais de Chaillot, French national Navy Museum, Paris.
- French national Navy Museum, Toulon, France.

== Awards ==
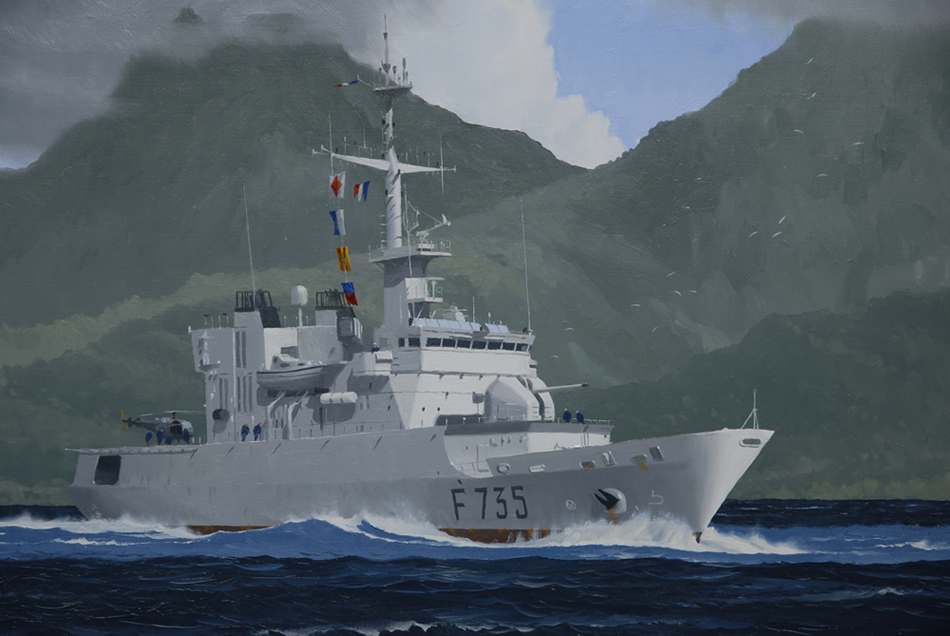
French Navy's Frigate "Germinal", John Pendray's painting.

- Bronze medal : French Navy meeting, French national Navy Museum, Palais de Chaillot, Paris, 1992.
- Bronze medal : French Navy meeting, French national Navy Museum, Palais de Chaillot, Paris, 1998.
- First prize, International Watercolour Competition, Tregastel, France
- French National Defense Medal, 2004.

== Publications ==
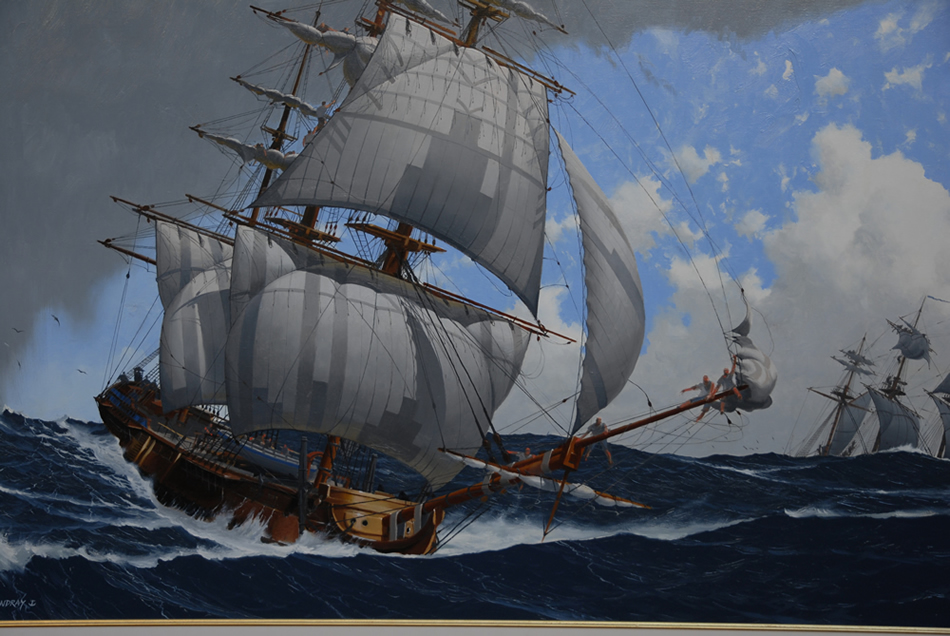
"La Boussole", Lapérouse's boat, famous French navy officer, John Pendray's painting.

- (in French) "Sur les traces de La Pérouse Carnets d'expedition à Vanikoro", John Pendray – Editions Glénat.

This sketch book was written and drawn by John Pendray during the French Navy's archaeological expedition to Vanikoro, one of the Solomon Islands, searching for traces of the tragic last voyage of the French explorer Lapérouse.

- (in French) "Les esprits de Vanikoro", François Bellec from "l'Académie de la Marine" – Editions Glénat.

There are several illustrations by John Pendray in this highly documented and precise history of Lapérouse's last voyage.

- (in French) "Les bateaux racontés aux Enfants", photographs by Philip Plisson, drawings by John Pendray – Editions De la Martiniere Jeunesse.

Also published in the US and UK as a children book, by Abrams Books with the title "Ships".

== Links ==
=== Related ===
- Official Painter of the French Navy
