= Jean Roque =

French painter

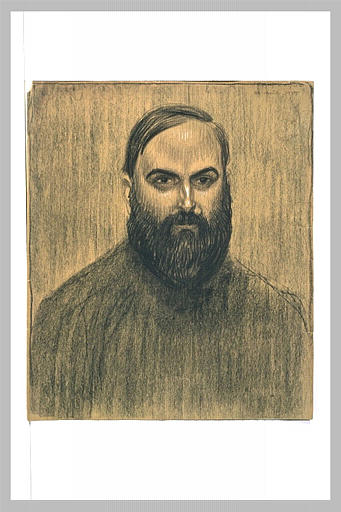
- Portrait of Roque by Theophile Steinlen on 30 August 1915
- Born: 8 January 1880; Marseille, Bouches-du-Rhône, France
- Died: 6 December 1925 (aged 45); Paris, France
- Occupation: Painter

Jean Roque (1880–1925) was a French painter.

== Biography ==
=== Early life ===
Jean Roque was born on 8 January 1880 in Marseille, Bouches-du-Rhône, France. He studied painting in Paris under the tutelage of Jean-Léon Gérôme (1824–1904) and Humbert.

=== Career ===
He became a professional painter. Early on in his career, he rejected the realism of Jean-Léon Gérôme, his teacher, and decided to focus on painting landscapes, especially the ones of Provence.

Most of his paintings were done from 1906 to 1924. In 1924, he became Peintre de la Marine.

Théophile Steinlen (1859–1923) painted his portrait in 1915.

=== Death ===
He died on 6 December 1925 in Paris. He was buried in the Cimetière Saint-Pierre in Marseille.

== Paintings ==
- Rochers en mer (1906–1908)
- Élégante sur la terrasse (1906–1908)
- Les Roches rouges à Agay (1908)
- Femme assise (1910)
- Piémontaise (1908–1910)
- Port de pêche animé (1911)
- Paysage provençal (1911)
- Village de pêcheur, bord de mer
- Le Retour (1913)
- Retour de pêche (1913)
- Le Port de Marseille (1914)
- Bateaux à quai (1915)
- Barque et pêcheurs au port (1919)
- Les Pêcheurs (1919)
- L'Intérieur du port de Marseille (1920)
- Le Port de Marseille, le bassin de la Joliette
- Bateaux dans le vieux port (1920)
- Cargo dans le port de Marseille
- Le Vieux port de Marseille et Notre-Dame de la Garde (1924)

== Gallery ==
Jean Roque
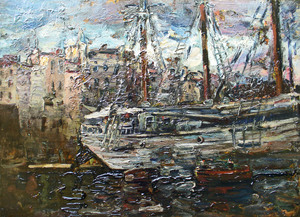
Le port de Marseille

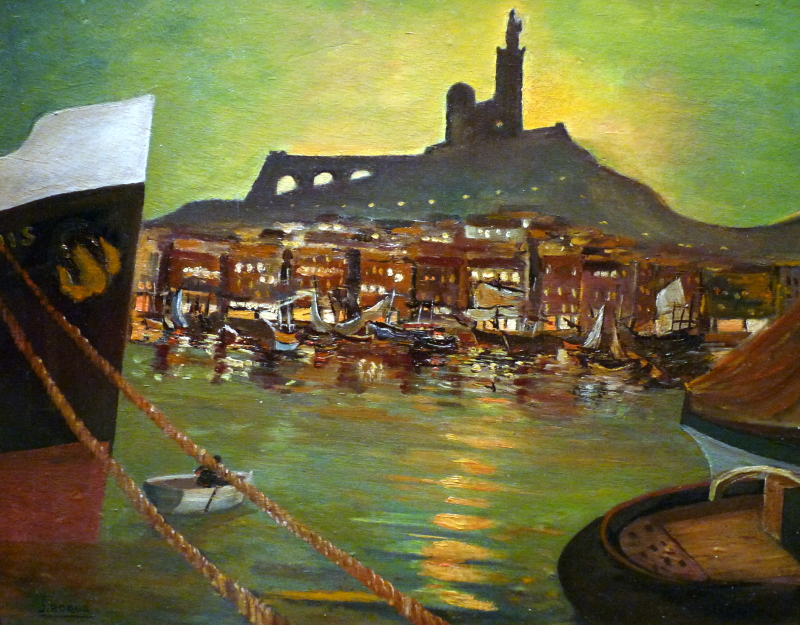
Le vieux port et Notre Dame de la Garde

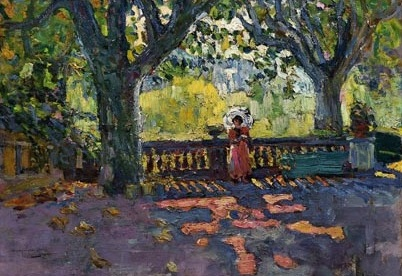
Elegante sur la terrasse

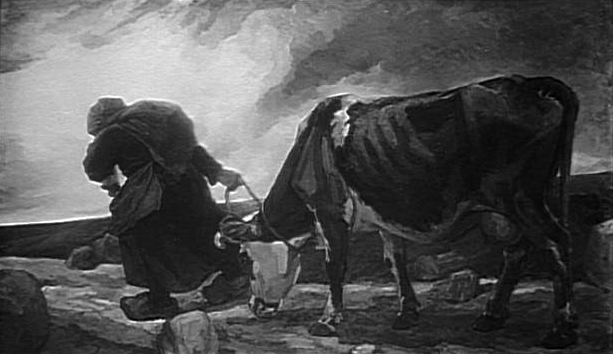
Le retour
