= Jean-Pierre Le Bras =

French painter

- Born: 5 February 1931; Pleumeur-Bodou, Côtes-d'Armor, France
- Died: 23 July 2017 (aged 86); Lannion, Côtes-d'Armor, France
- Occupation: Painter

Jean-Pierre Le Bras (5 February 1931 – 23 July 2017) was a French landscape and maritime painter. He was an official Peintre de la Marine from 1997 to 2017.
