= Arvid Johanson (painter) =

Swedish-French marine painter (1862–1923)

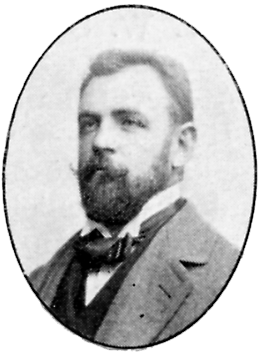
Arvid Johanson

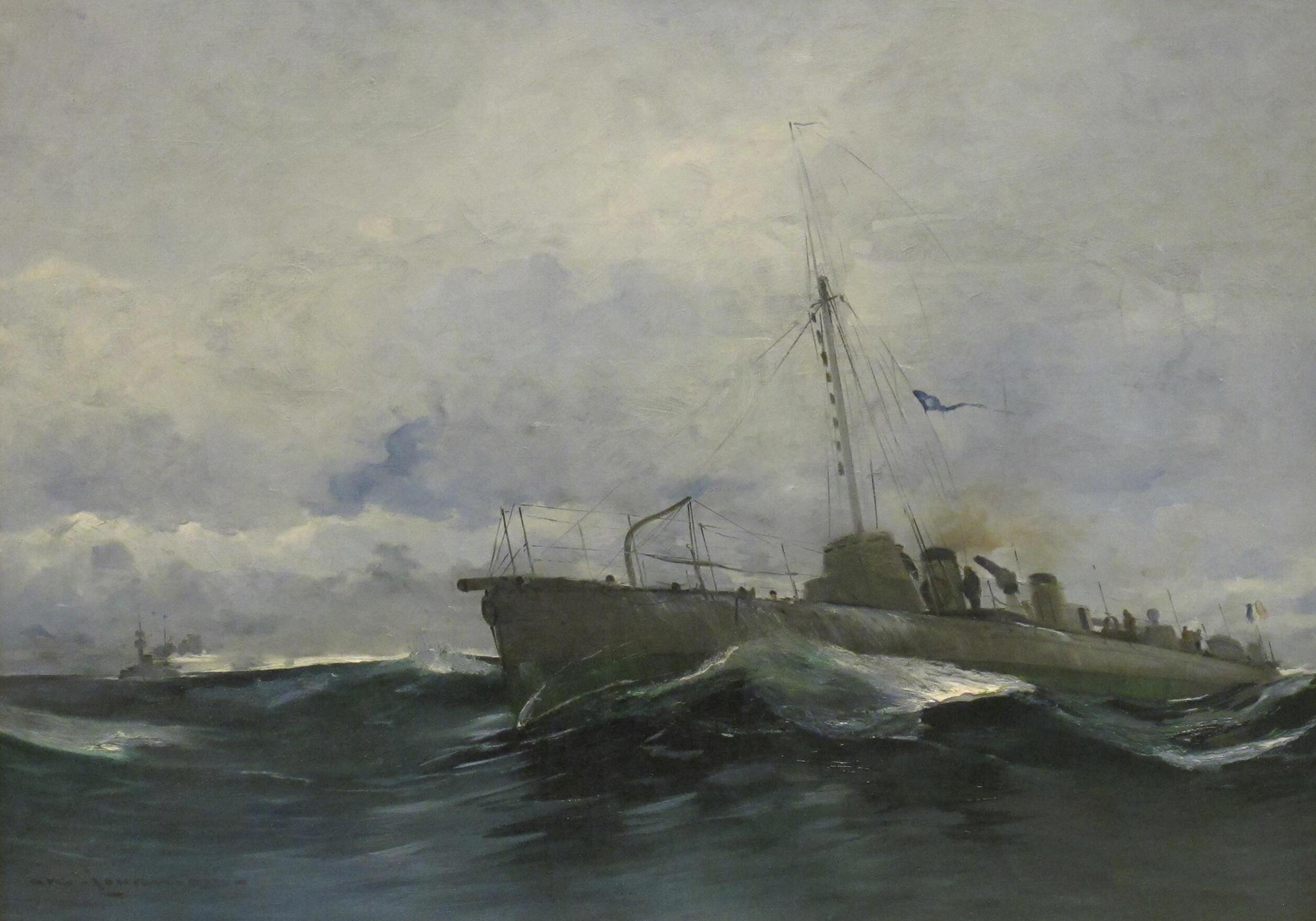
Painting of a French Navy torpedo boat by Johanson

Arvid Claes William Johanson (29 May 1862 – 25 March 1923) was a Swedish-French artist who specialised in marine art.

Johanson was born on Södermalm in Stockholm. His father was a painter employed by the Swedish Navy. Arvid Johanson began studying art at the Royal Swedish Academy of Fine Arts, but moved to Düsseldorf to continue his studies in 1882. He also studied for some time under Hendrik Willem Mesdag in The Hague, before settling in Paris. He would remain in Paris for most of his life. From 1907 onwards he spent many of his summers on the west coast of Sweden, where he found further inspiration for his art. He spent World War I in Sweden, as he was unable to go back to France. After the end of the war, he moved back to Paris. He died there in 1923.

After settling in France, Johanson soon established himself as an illustrator, contributing to French periodicals such as Le Monde illustré, Le Journal and L'Illustration. He also contributed to English periodicals. In his capacity as an illustrator for L'Illustration Johanson was allowed to accompany the French Navy on several journeys. He also began producing marine paintings through official commissions, and in 1897 Johanson was named Peintre de la Marine, or Painter of the Fleet.

Johanson exhibited his paintings in France, Valand Academy in Gothenburg, and in Stockholm; one of his paintings was rewarded with a medal at the 1900 Paris Exposition. Stylistically, he was a realist with impressionist influences. Paintings by Johanson are in the collections of Nationalmuseum (Stockholm), Gothenburg Museum of Art (Gothenburg), Musée national de la Marine de Paris (Paris), Marinmuseum (Karlskrona) and the Maritime Museum (Stockholm).
