= Dirk Verdoorn =

Dutch painter

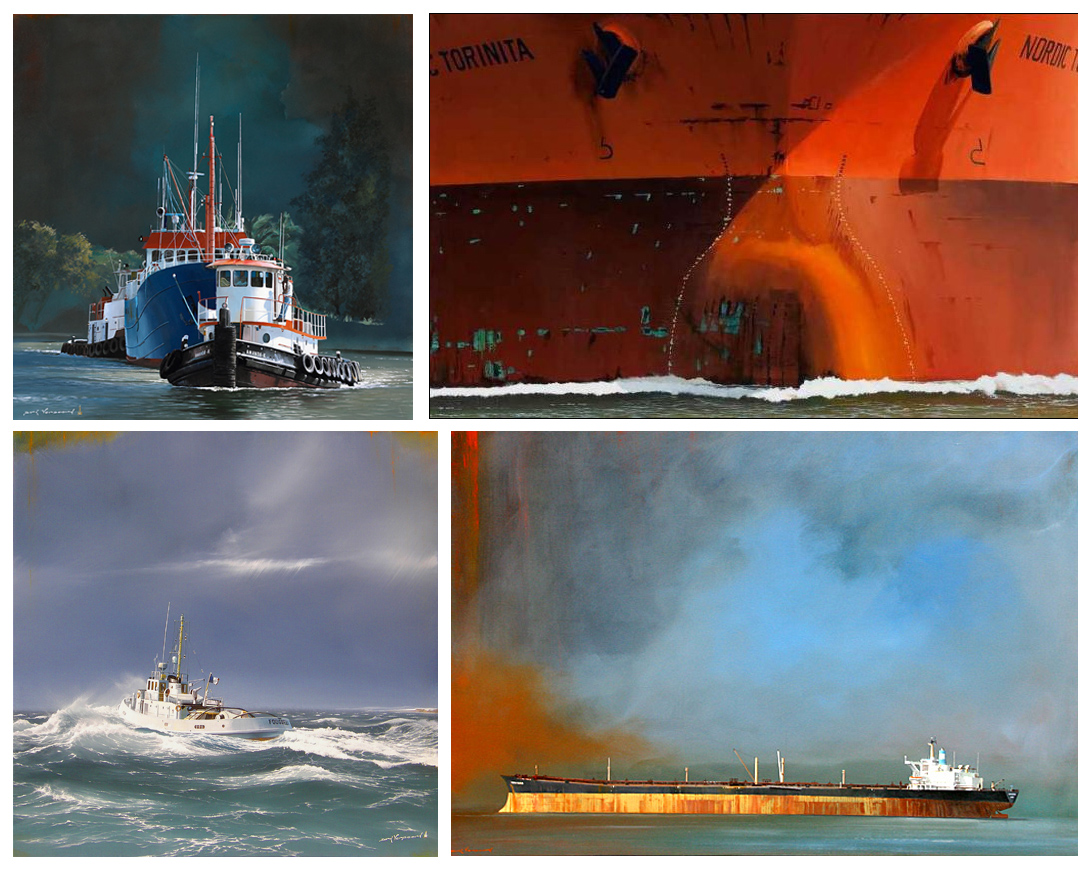
- Four paintings by Dirk Verdoorn : L'arrivée (2007) - Torinita (2005) - Le Fougueux (2009) - En rade (2006).
- Born: 1957 (age 68–69); Dordrecht, Netherlands
- Known for: Painter
- Notable work: Nordic Torinita, Pegasus au boulot
- Movement: Maxirealism
- Awards: Gold medalist at the Salon de la Marine (2005), peintre de la marine

Dirk Verdoorn (born 1957 in Dordrecht), is a French peintre de la marine from the Netherlands. He spent his childhood on a barge at the confluence of the Waal, the Meuse and the Merwede, before settling in France. He worked as an art teacher and stage designer before beginning to sell his paintings in 1997.

In 2001, he received the bronze medal at the Salon de la Marine, then the gold medal two years later. In 2005, he was appointed peintre de la marine agréé.

He currently lives in south Italy, along the Ionian Sea.

== Bibliography ==
- Dirk Verdoorn, Contemporary Sea Artist, Livre d'art, tome II, éditions Salentina, octobre 2012
- Dirk Verdoorn, Marines as Militant Art, portrait d'Andrée Maennel dans Dessins et peintures n^{o} 19, août-septembre 2009
- Dirk Verdoorn, Contemporary Sea Artist, Livre d'art, Editions Goss, octobre 2008
