= Philip Plisson =

French photographer (born 1947)

Philip Plisson (born 27 January 1947, Orléans, France) is a French photographer best known for his maritime photography. Together with his son Guillaume, who is also a photographer, he set up the publishing company Pêcheur d'Images. He has produced numerous books including collections of photographs featuring Brittany, Ireland, Scotland and the ocean liner Queen Mary 2. His 65th book, Les Marées, was named Maritime Book of the Year at the 2012 Paris Boat Show.

He is accused of rape by his niece and indicted in September 2010, for acts which allegedly took place in 1999 in a family home in Morbihan [1] A trial was held in May 2014 at the end of which he was sentenced by the Morbihan Assize Court to three years in prison . On 27 May 2014 he appealed against this judgment . an appeal which he renounced in November 2014 .

In 1991 he became one of the few photographers to be awarded the title Peintre de la Marine (Official Painter of the French Navy), a title later revoked in 2016 following his sentencing.

== Partial bibliography ==
- (1999) Phares Ouest. Les Phares Majeurs de l'arc Atlantique ISBN 978-2-8427-7116-4
- (2003) The Sea:Exploring Life on an Ocean Planet (with Robert Burleigh and Emmanuel Cerisier) ISBN 978-0-8109-4591-3
- (2004) Queen Mary 2: The Birth of a Legend ISBN 978-0-8109-5613-1
- (2004) The Sea:Day by Day ISBN 978-0-8109-4802-0
- (2005) Lighthouses ISBN 978-0-8109-5958-3
- (2006) Ocean (with Christian Buchet) ISBN 978-0-500-54324-5
- (2007) Sailor's Wisdom:Day by Day ISBN 978-0-8109-9448-5
- (2012) Les Marées ISBN 978-2-8123-0624-2
