= Alain Bailhache =

French painter and illustrator (1937–2025)

- Born: 27 November 1937; Guéret, France
- Died: 2 February 2025 (aged 87); Dinard, France
- Education: Interior architecture and decorative arts at École nationale supérieure des arts décoratifs
- Known for: Painting, illustration, watercolour and interior architecture
- Awards: Appointment as a Peintre de la Marine (1997)

Alain Bailhache (27 November 1937 – 2 February 2025) was a French painter, illustrator, children's-book author and interior architect. He spent a significant part of his career in Iran, where he taught interior architecture at the Tehran School of Decorative Arts and illustrated more than twenty Persian children's books.

His paintings and illustrations combined Persian visual traditions and Iranian architecture with European line drawing, perspective and luminous colour. After returning to France, maritime subjects, ships and the coastal architecture of Brittany became central to his work. He was appointed a Peintre officiel de la Marine, or official painter of the French Navy, in 1997.

== Early life and education ==
Bailhache was born on 27 November 1937 in Guéret, in the Creuse department of central France. He studied for four years at the École nationale supérieure des arts décoratifs in Paris, in the class known as the promotion Maillol, and trained in interior architecture and decoration. From 1962 until the late 1960s he worked on interior-design and hospital-renovation projects in Paris.

== Career in Iran ==
After travelling to the Middle East in 1967, Bailhache settled in Tehran. He taught interior architecture at the Tehran School of Decorative Arts for approximately twelve years and worked on architectural projects in Tehran and Isfahan. His projects included the interior design of two children's libraries operated by the Institute for the Intellectual Development of Children and Young Adults, commonly known as Kanoon, in Tehran and Karaj.

Bailhache became widely known in Iran through his illustrations for children's books. His illustrations for Baba Barfi (lit. Father Snow), written by Jabbar Baghtcheban and first published by Kanoon in 1970, began one of his best-known collaborations with the institute. By 2014, the book had reached its fifteenth printing and a cumulative circulation of more than 300,000 copies.

He illustrated more than twenty books published by Kanoon and other Iranian publishers. They included The Sea Shepherd, The Star, The Little Girl and the Narcissus, The Hope of the Goldfinch, The Thoughtless Man, Dew Rain, The Boatman of Anahid, The Wolf and the Hare, The Three Golden Hairs, and The Water of Life. Bailhache wrote as well as illustrated some of these books.

His book Two Friends follows French and Iranian characters travelling through Iran and encountering the country's architecture, customs and historical sites. Kanoon published the book in 2008 and presented it at the Tehran International Book Fair.

In December 2006, Kanoon presented 66 original illustrations from seven of Bailhache's books at its Centre for Cultural and Artistic Creations in Tehran.

== Painting and style ==
Iranian architecture, particularly the buildings and urban landscapes of Isfahan, Kashan, Yazd and the desert regions, remained central to Bailhache's work after his return to France. His watercolours typically combined precise ink lines and architectural perspective with saturated blues, ochres and turquoise tones. Critics and Iranian illustrators described his work as combining European draughtsmanship with the detail, symmetry and colour of Persian miniature painting.

His book Ispahan, l'espace voilé du désir, published in Persian as Isfahan, the Hidden Place of My Heart: Watercolours by the French Painter Alain Bailhache, assembled his paintings of Isfahan. A Persian edition, translated by Hamed Fouladvand and Karim Emami, was published by Yassavoli.

Five of Bailhache's Iranian watercolours are held by the Niavaran Cultural–Historical Complex in Tehran, in the collections of the Niavaran Palace private library, Niavaran Palace and the Jahan Nama Museum. The works underwent conservation treatment in 2015.

== Return to France and marine painting ==
Bailhache returned to France after the Iranian Revolution and settled in Brittany. He continued to work with Iranian publishers and made further professional visits to Iran, while developing a body of work devoted to Saint-Malo, Dinard, the Brittany coast, ports and naval vessels.

He participated in several Salons de la Marine and was admitted to the corps of official French Navy artists on 1 March 1997. His marine paintings continued the detailed line, bright colour and decorative organisation found in his Iranian work.

Bailhache collaborated with historian Gilles Foucqueron on two illustrated books about Saint-Malo and its architectural heritage. L'Épopée des Malouinières contains more than eighty of Bailhache's watercolours, while Saint-Malo en l'Isle includes more than seventy works.

Bailhache died in Dinard on 2 February 2025, aged 87. Later that year, the Centre Cristel Éditeur d'Art in Saint-Malo organised the retrospective Vents d'ouest et rêves d'Orient, focusing on the relationship between his Iranian imagery and the maritime landscapes of the Emerald Coast.

== Selected publications ==
=== Iranian children's books ===
- Baba Barfi (Father Snow), written by Jabbar Baghtcheban, illustrated by Bailhache, 1970
- The Sea Shepherd, written and illustrated by Bailhache, 1975
- The Star, written and illustrated by Bailhache
- Two Friends, written and illustrated by Bailhache, 2008
- Zhinzhanbar, the Nowruz Bird, written by Marjan Fouladvand and illustrated by Bailhache, 2015

=== Art and architectural publications ===
- Paris, Bretagne, Iran: itinéraire d'un peintre, 1995
- Ispahan, l'espace voilé du désir, 1995
- Chateaubriand: terres et demeures d'outre-temps, with Bernard Heudré, 1998
- Félicité de Lamennais, with Bernard Heudré, 2001
- L'Épopée des Malouinières, with Gilles Foucqueron, 2007
- Saint-Malo en l'Isle, with Gilles Foucqueron, 2011
