= Mathurin Méheut =

French artist (1882–1958)

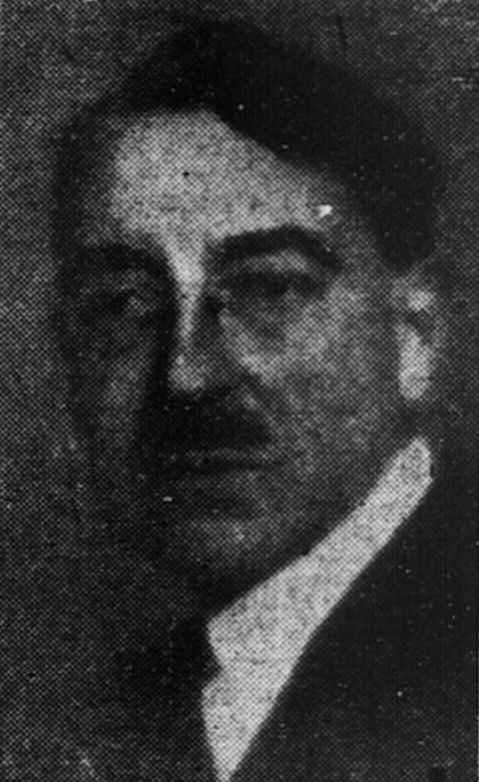
Photo, 1941 or before

Mathurin Méheut (French: [matyʁɛ̃ meø]; 21 May 1882 – 22 February 1958) was a French painter, ceramist, engraver, and etcher best known for his depictions of Breton scenes, the sea, and nature.

Méheut was born into a family of artisans in Lamballe, Brittany, and apprenticed to a house painter before entering the École des Beaux-Arts de Rennes in 1898, from which he graduated at age 20. He then attended the École nationale supérieure des arts décoratifs in Paris, working for the revue Arts et Décoration to finance his studies. In 1906 he exhibited with the Société des Artistes Français.

From 1910 to 1912 Méheut collaborated with naturalists at the Roscoff marine biology station to depict marine life. This period culminated in a book (Etude de la mer, flore et faune de la Manche et de l’Océan) and 450 works exhibited at the Musée des Arts Décoratifs in 1913. In 1914 he was awarded a travel scholarship by the Foundation Albert Kahn for visits to Hawaii and Japan in 1914, but his trip was cut short by World War I.

In 1921 Méheut became the French Ministry of Defence's official painter and in 1925 began decorating commercial passenger ships, including the SS Normandie. Between world wars, he illustrated books for authors including Colette, Maurice Genevoix, and Pierre Loti, and created ceramics at Henriot in Quimper, at the Manufacture nationale de Sèvres, and at Villeroy & Boch in Sarre. During the 1940s he taught at the École des Beaux-Arts de Rennes, served as decorator for the Institut de Géologie de Rennes, and completed his celebrated illustrations of Florian Le Roy's Vieux métiers bretons.

The Musée Mathurin Méheut in Lamballe, created in 1972, preserves his work.
