= Jean Bailhache =

French writer and translator (1911–1986)

- Born: 4 March 1911; Pontoise, France
- Died: 13 August 1986 (aged 75); Nice, France
- Occupation: Writer
- Writing career
- Genres: Travel literature, memoir

Jean Bailhache (4 March 1911 – 13 August 1986) was a French writer and translator, particularly known for his war memoir Souvenirs d'un endormi and his highly informed and creative guidebooks about the United Kingdom and Denmark. After having fought in World War II, he decided to start writing and, in 1947, he won the coveted "Prix Alfred Née" of the Académie française for his book Le Secret anglais. He then contributed with two works for the famous guidebook collection "Petite Planète", run by Chris Marker and published between 1954 and 1964 by the Éditions du Seuil. In the 1970s, he mostly worked as the translator into French of Ursula K. Le Guin's novels and in the 1980s of those of Roger Zelazny.

Bailhache died in Nice on 13 August 1986, at the age of 75.

== Bibliography ==
- Souvenirs d'un endormi (Éditions Gallimard, 1947)
- Le Secret anglais (Les Éditions de Minuit, 1947)
- Danemark (Éditions du Seuil, 1958)
- Grande-Bretagne (Éditions du Seuil, 1960)
