= Jean Rigaud =

French painter

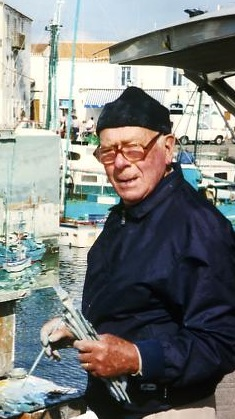
Jean Rigaud in 1996

Jean Rigaud (15 June 1912 – 7 February 1999) was a well-listed French painter, closely associated to the French Navy.

== Early life ==
He was born on 15 June 1912 in Bordeaux, France to the well-known painter, Pierre Gaston Rigaud (1874–1939). The Rigaud family moved to the village of Guyenne in 1914, shortly after World War I began. It was during this time that Jean Rigaud received his first formal training under his father, Pierre Gaston, who was also a well-respected teacher. During this time, Jean was encouraged to develop his own style and talents, which utilized "pure color tones (ochres, yellows and red cadmium) which [stood] out triumphantly against grey skies."

In 1925 Jean Rigaud was invited to exhibit his works at the Salon d'Art Ancien Espagnol in Paris, where he became a regular. Jean also continued his formal education at the École des Beaux-Arts in Paris at the Atelier André Dewambez. While at the Atelier, Jean Rigaud began to develop his unique impressionistic style and techniques. He also began painting marine subjects for which he became known. However, this did not mean that he did not paint other scenes. As "a painter of instinct", who focused on scenery, villages and abodes were not out of the realm. Examples of these works include "Tolede: Contre Jour" a 28 ¾" x 19 ¾" oil on canvas painting "L'Isle Adam", and "Ker Guerin, Île d'Yeu." However, according to a brief biography by Banks Fine Art, Rigaud "saved little room for precise depictions of the human figure in his works."

From 1938 to 1976, Jean Rigaud participated in 53 one-man exhibitions, including at the Galerie Durand-Ruel in which he was featured every other year from 1956 to 1974. Furthermore, as a tribute, The Galerie Durand Ruel featured Rigaud's work in their final exhibition as a "Grand Finale."

During his lifetime, Jean Rigaud was invited to exhibit his work at all of the leading Paris Salons, which included the Société Nationale des Beaux-Arts, Salon "Comparaisons", Salon du Dessin et de la Peinture a l'eau and the Salon de la Marine. Rigaud also exhibited his works in Casablanca, New York, and Strasbourg. He also received a Gold Medal at The International Exhibition in Paris in 1937, the Prize of Messageries Maritimes in 1952, the Prize of Morocco in 1953, and the Prize of Charles Cottet in 1957 as well as "Painter of the French Navy" honors in 1956.

Jean Rigaud's works are featured in many private and public collections across the world. His paintings are also permanently exhibited at the National Museum in Paris, Musée de la Marine, Musée de Niort, Musée de Tours, Musée de Poitiers, Musée Mulhouse, Musée Chalet, Musée Pontoise, and Musée Strasbourg. Jean Rigaud is also well listed in over a dozen prestigious books on art. Jean Rigaud died in 1999 in Paris, and immediately after his death, the Musée national de la Marine mounted a one-man retrospective of his work, which was met with great critical acclaim. "Jean Rigaud is placed without doubt in the great tradition of realist and impressionist painter."

== His friends ==
Among his colleagues, his closest friends were Louis Vuillermoz, Daniel du Janerand and chiefly Maurice Boitel whom he brought in car for painting to Yport (Normandy), into Ile de Sein (Brittany), and whom he convinced to come and paint in Yeu island.

== Sources ==
- Jean Rigaud. Banks Fine Art. 2006. https://web.archive.org/web/20060826194233/http://www.banksfineart.com/html/Detail.asp?WorkInvNum=161&whatpage=artist
- Jean Rigaud. La Galerie Du Chateau. http://www.dicart-net.fr/PHOTOS/RIGAUD/Amg0000.htm
