= Gustave Garaud =

French painter

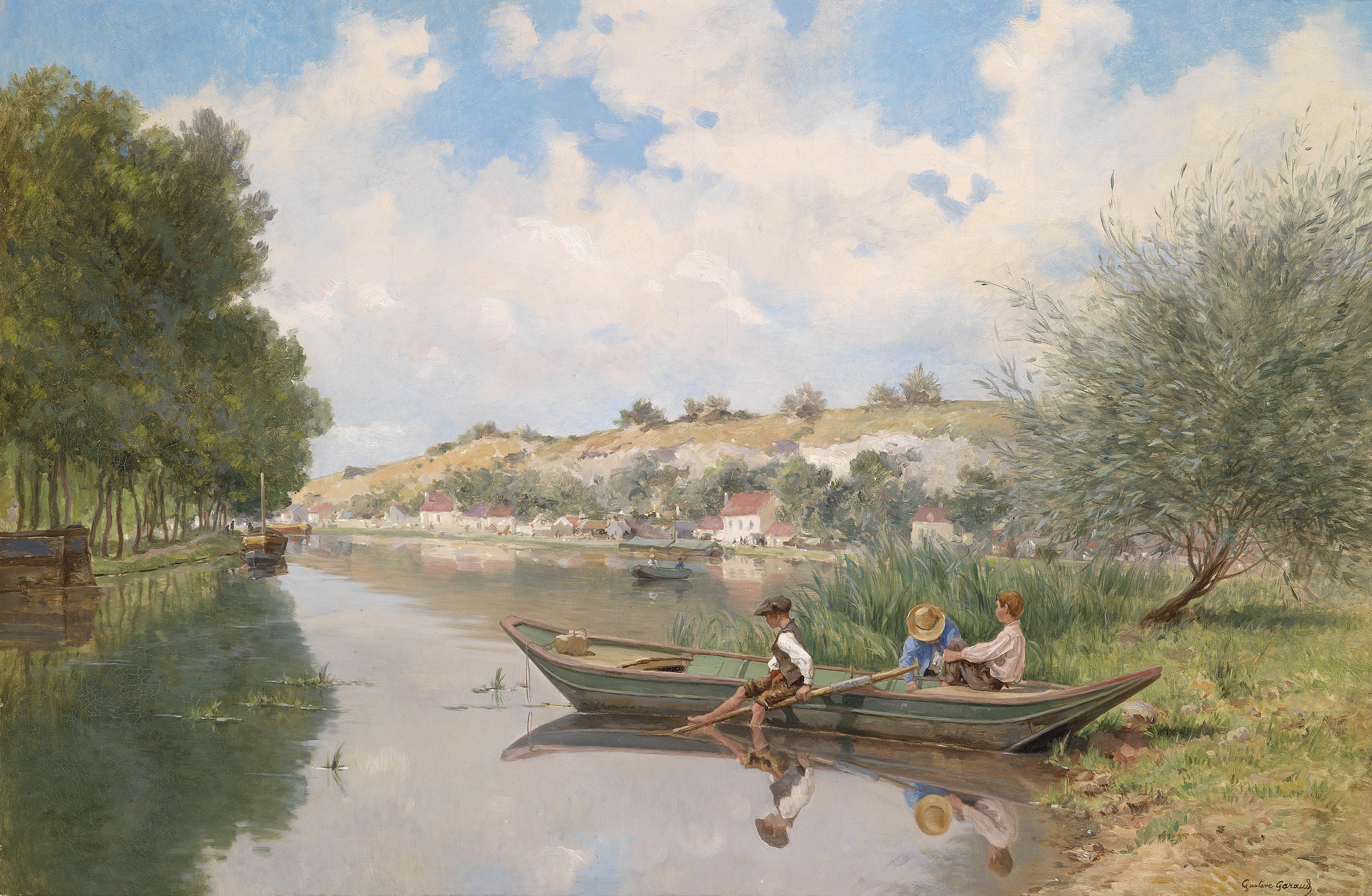
Boys by the River

Gustave Césaire Garaud (25 July 1844, Toulon – 23 June 1914, Nice) was a French painter of landscapes, in traditional style.

== Biography ==
He was a student of François-Louis Français. His first exhibit at the Salon came in 1878, and he would continue to have showings there until his death. In 1881, two of his works, "Bord du Gapeau près de Montrieux" and "Les Pins de Notre-Dame sous Fenouillet", received honorable mention and were purchased by the Musée d'Art de Toulon. In 1889, he was awarded two third-class medals and, in 1893, two second-class medals.

He opened a workshop in Paris, dividing his time between painting there, in Provence and in Brittany. He also created some landscapes in Corsica. Although he never became famous, he enjoyed a good reputation among collectors and was able to organize two exhibits of his own, at the Cercle Volney, in 1891 and 1900. In addition to his canvases, he decorated some private buildings.

During this time, he travelled widely; especially to what was then French Indochina. Inspired by these travels, he illustrated several books dealing with the Far East, notably L'Indochine française contemporaine : Cochinchine, Cambodge, Tonkin et Annam, by Albert Bouinais and Armin Paulus.

As he grew older, he decided to leave Paris and settle in Nice, where he established a studio and taught drawing. He died there, aged seventy.

== Sources ==
- André Alauzen and Laurent Noet, Dictionnaire des peintres et sculpteurs de Provence-Alpes-Côte d'Azur, Jeanne Laffitte, 2006 ISBN 978-2-86276-441-2
- Gaston Coindre, his personal journal @ Mémoire Vive, Ville de Besançon
