= Ernest Guérin =

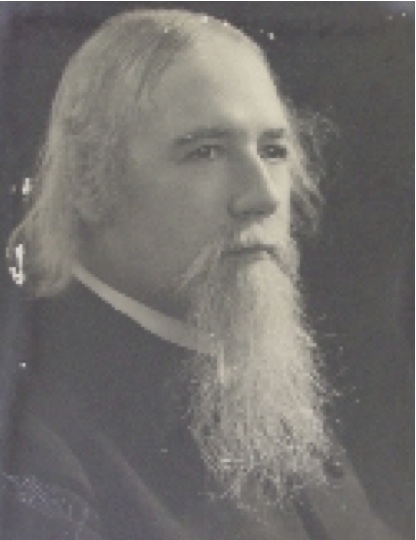

Ernest Pierre-Marie Guérin (1887 in Rennes – 1952 in Quiberon) was a painter famous for his canvases and triptychs influenced by the late Pre-Raphaelite Brotherhood and illumination. Internationally recognized for his artwork inspired by Breton and Celtic medieval themes, he was forgotten after World War II and re-discovered at the beginning of the 21st century.

== Education ==
Ernest Guérin studied at the School of Fine Arts of Rennes at Félix Lafond's and Jules Ronsin's ateliers.

== Career ==
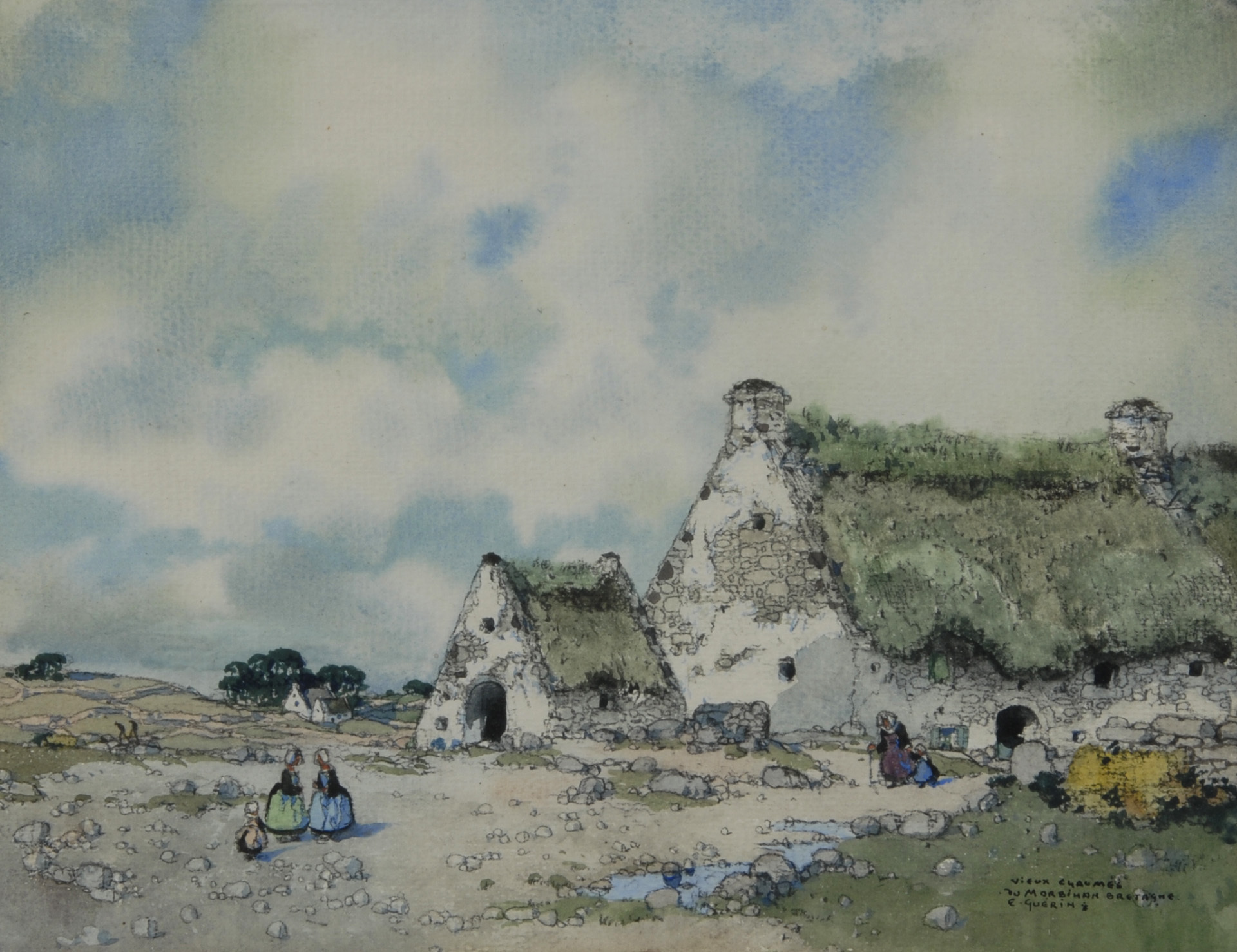
Ernest Guérin: Old thatches in Morbihan.

After traveling to Paris, he worked for architect Edmond Gemain in Vannes as a drawer.

By his characteristic canvas, Guérin's reputation grew rapidly, alongside Mathurin Méheut (1882–1958) with whom he shared many themes. He was a friend of Breton writer Anatole Le Braz (1859–1926).

He became a member and exposes at the "Salon of the French Artists" in Paris as well as the South Wales Society. He also showed his work at the Royal Cambrian Academy. He becomes internationally famous and gets commissions from the socially highest classes, as well as the British crown. Only aged 2-, he is chosen by the Musée des arts décoratifs de Paris to show his work in 1913. The same year, he married Renée Lebouc.

During World War I, he served in 1915–1916 in the 70th Infantry Regiment and the 50th Artillery Regiment as a tracer at the Construction Workshop of Rennes.

His reputation allowed him to paint large sceneries for the Hôtel Moderne in Rennes. He also worked in France. But he decided to leave the hustle and bustle of Paris and settled in Dinard, in the north coast of Brittany, and then Quiberon, on the south coast. He opened an art gallery in these two towns to represent his work.

Celebrated during his life time, he was forgotten after his death in 1952 by the museum curators. An exhibition in Rennes in 2001–2002 led to a rediscovery of his work by the public and critics.

== Awards and honours ==
He was awarded the medal of in 1905 de vermeil by the School of Fine Arts of Paris, and the medal of excellence in 1907.

== Influences and themes ==
Guérin's painting is characterized by a late influence of the preraphaelite movement. Being studied the medieval illumination techniques, he uses them in his work with great finesse. He also puts a medieval atmosphere in his picture framework.

His artwork is inspired by Brittany, religion and Celtic medieval themes. His Breton canvas are about the harshness of life, the customs of the Breton peasants, the traditional religious festivities and the wild character of Brittany through its landscapes, its climate and its atmospheres. He witnesses of the traditions of the village life and of the religious believes in everyday life. He paints maritime miniatures, ports animated with tiny silhouettes, fishing barks, landscapes with slender trees and skies with vaporous clouds, pardons (Bretons ceremonies) in Penmarc'h, Tronoën, Le Faouët, etc.

He is inspired by medieval themes (for example in the representation of the Arthurian cycle, La Belle Guénaran, Aloïda...), and religious ones (illustration of Gospel scenes from Saint Matthew and Saint Luke, portraits of saints). The religious dimension is frequent in his work.

Guérin's work also include a orientalist period, notably Tunisian. At the end of hislife, he turns his esthetism to a more « taoist » vision. His landscpaes reflects un art inspired by Japanese and Chinese work, combining little characters with oppressive horizons which fill the entire setting.

Guérin mastered gouache, watercolor painting and illumination altogether. He exposed constantly during his lifetime.

== Collections ==
Museums displaying some of his artwork:

- Museum of Fine Arts, Nantes : Notre-Dame de Lotivy, drawing.
- Museum of Fine Arts, Rennes :
  - Deux scènes de la vie de saint Yves, 1903, watercolor,
  - Mariage breton, 1913, watercolor.
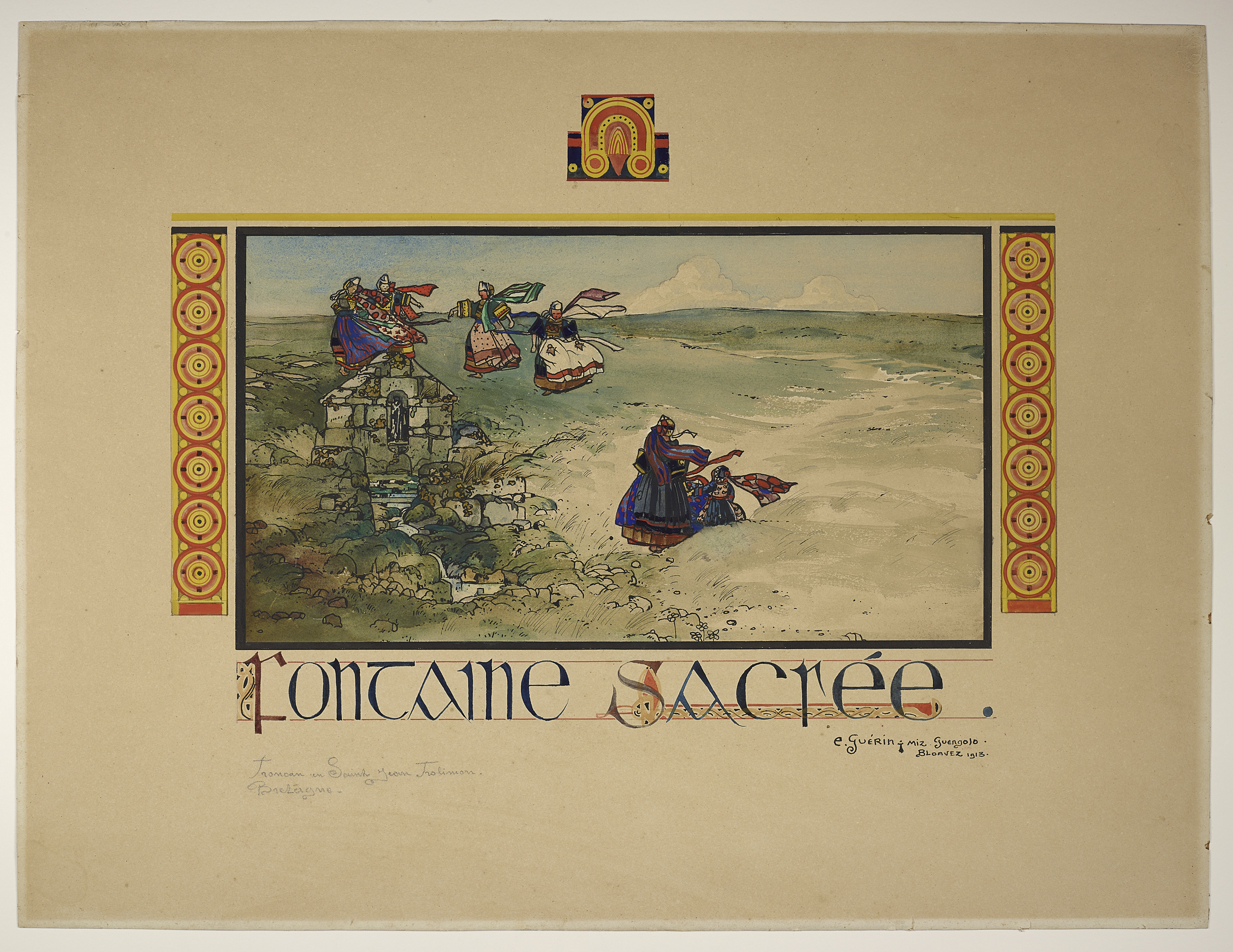
- Sacred spring in Tronoën, from the museum of Brittany collection.
  Museum of Brittany, Rennes : 5 documents.
- Museum of Fine Arts Saint-Brieuc.

== Other works ==
- Notre-Dame de la Joie, Saint-Guénolé, Penmarc'h, Bretagne, watercolor triptych, 48x110 cm.
- Notre-Dame de Châteaulin
- Notre-Dame-des-Fleurs, Plouharnel
Landscapes
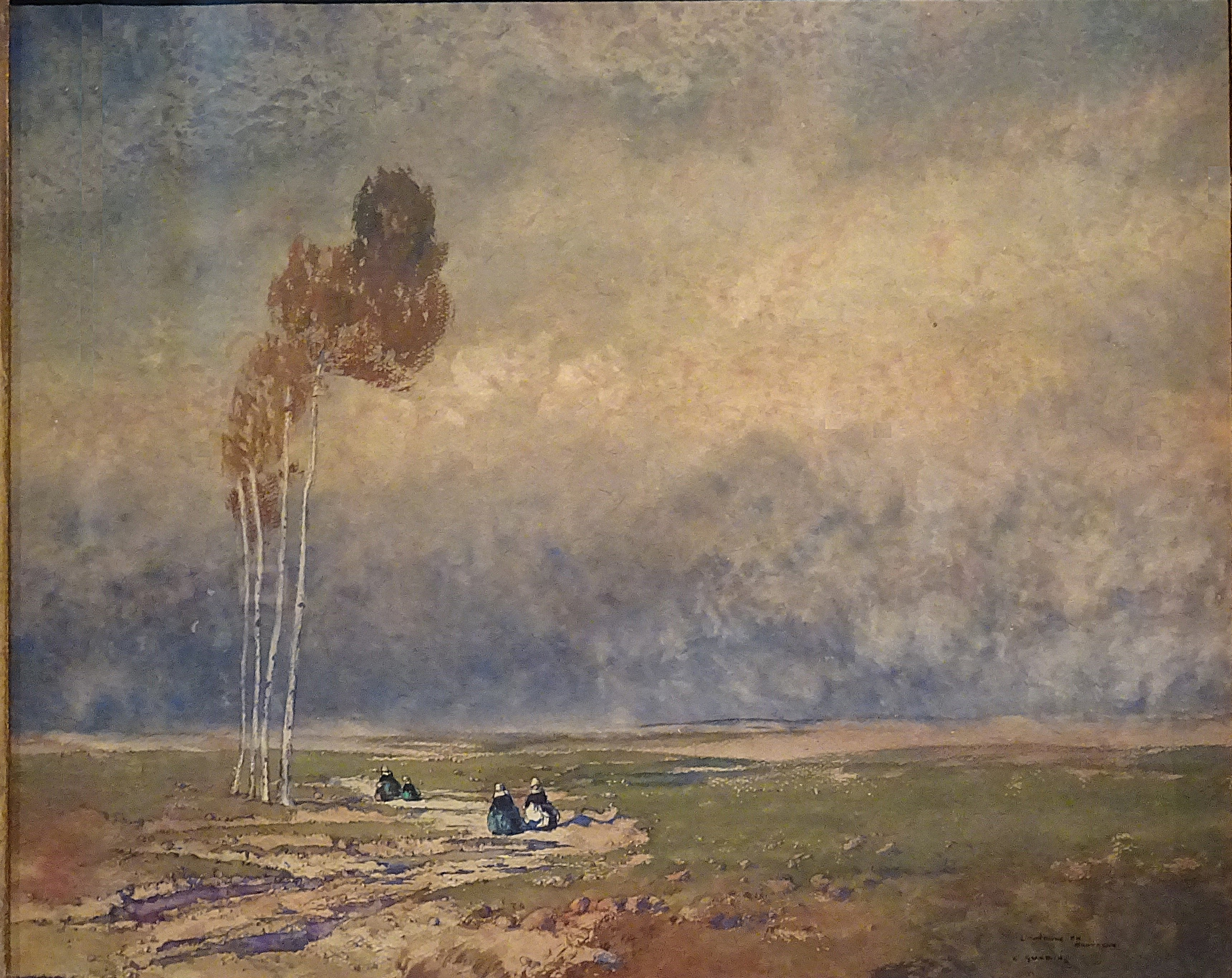
L'automne en Bretagne (black lead, watercolor and gouache on paper, not dated).

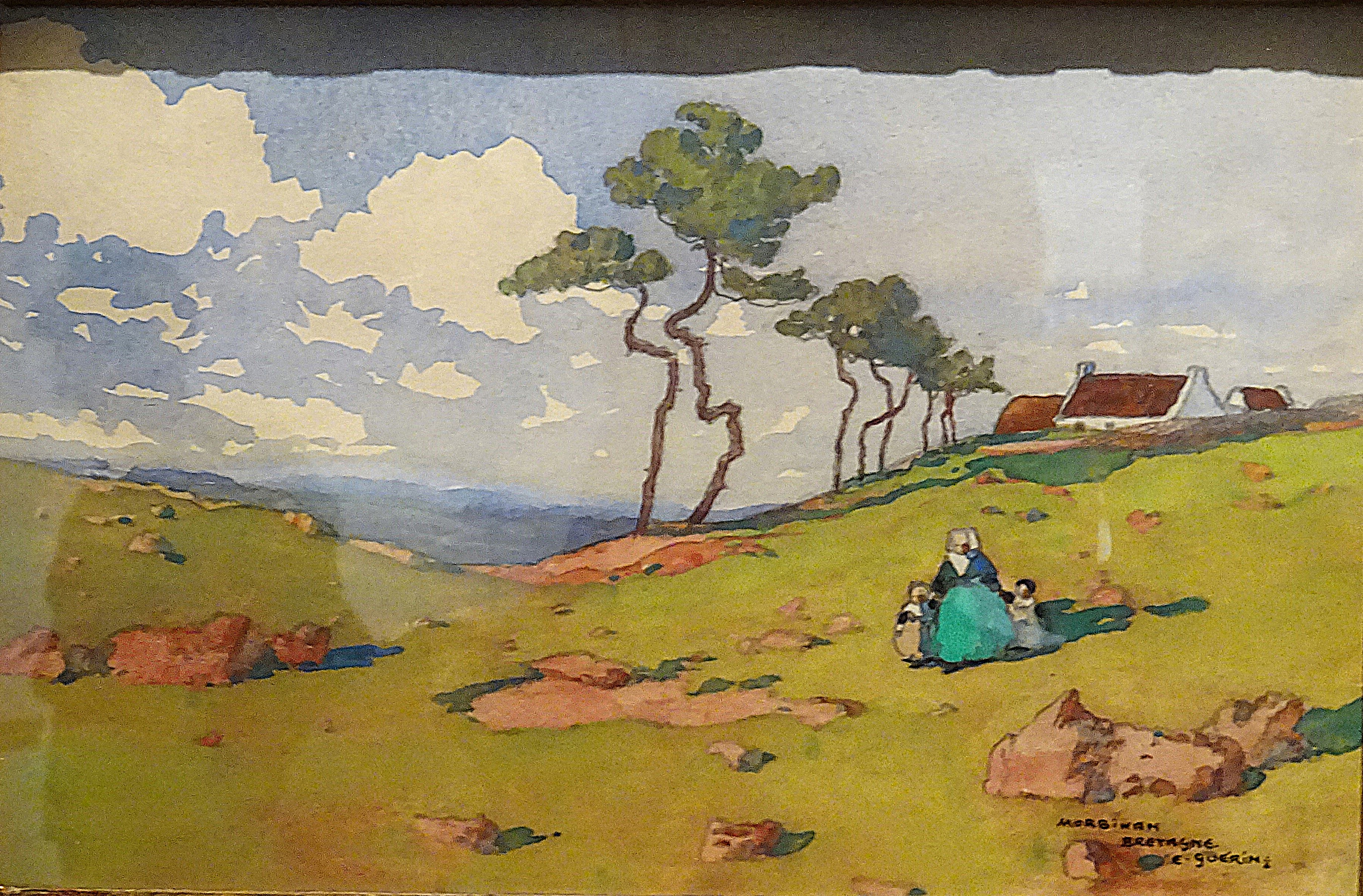
Morbihan, Bretagne (watercolor and gouache on paper, not dated).

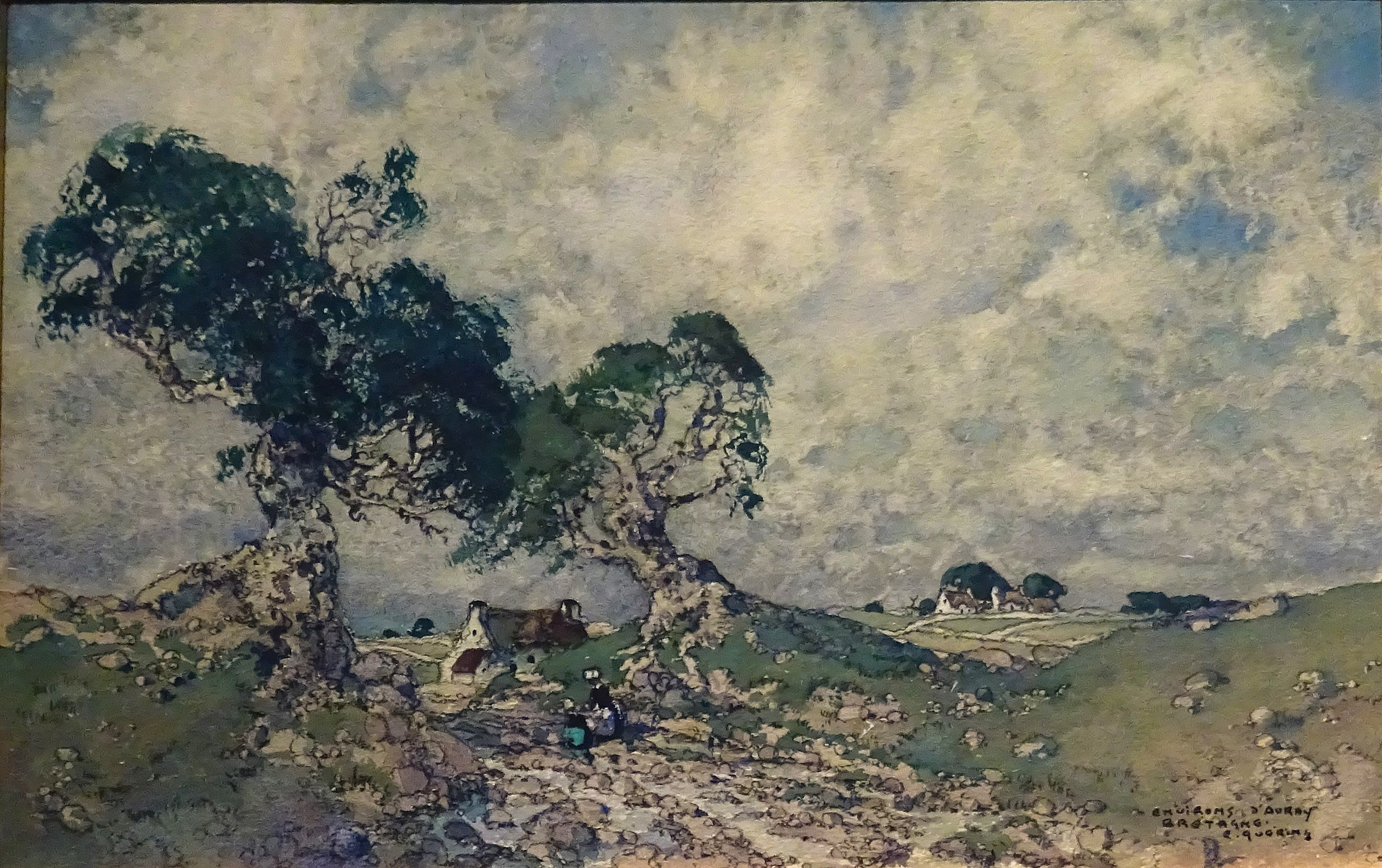
Environs d'Auray (not dated).

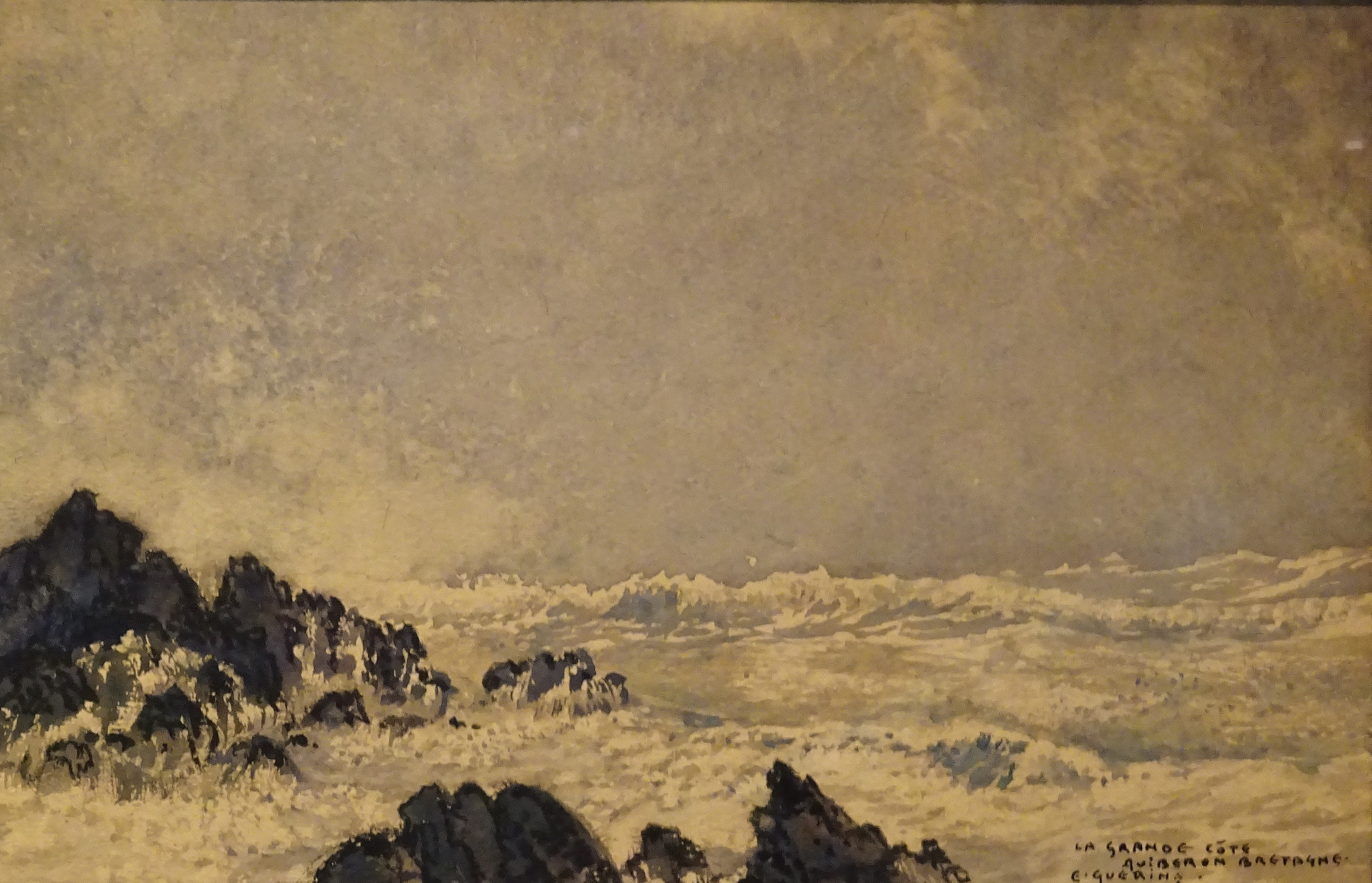
La Grande Côte, Quiberon, Bretagne (watercolor on paper, not dated).
Pardons and chapels
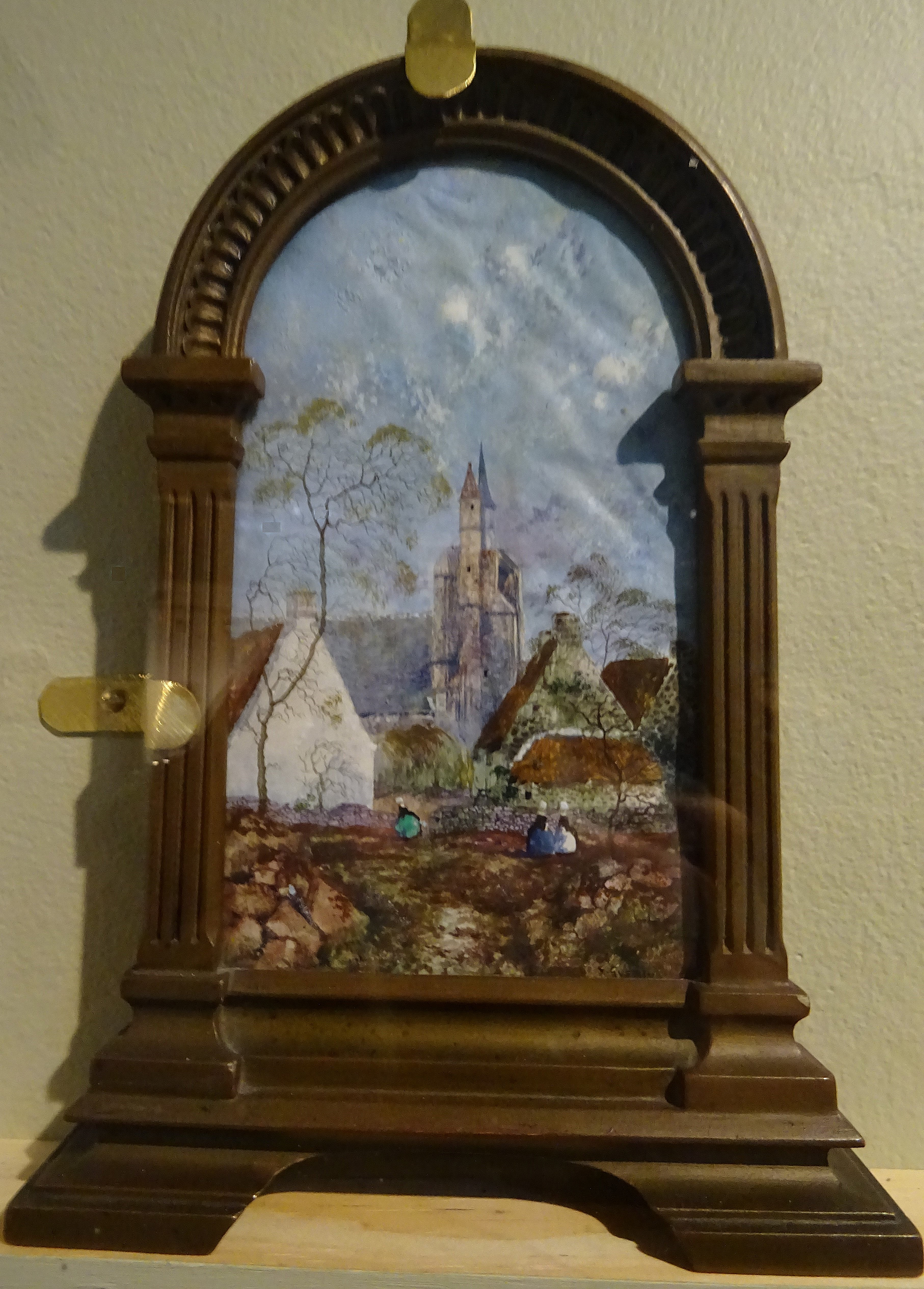
Sainte-Avoye, Brittany, between 1930 and 1943 (watercolor and gouache on paper).

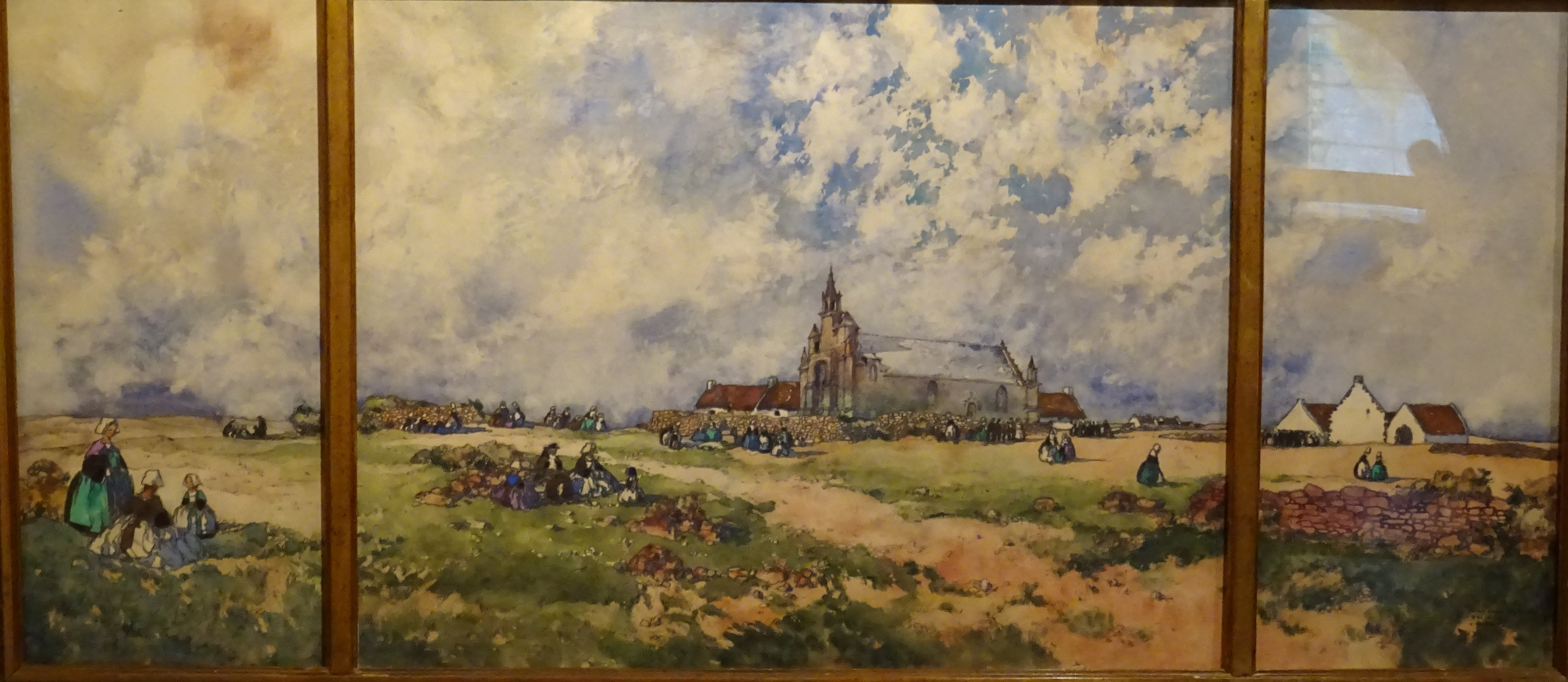
Notre-Dame-des-Fleurs, Plouharnel, Bretagne, around 1940 (black lead, watercolor and gouache on paper).

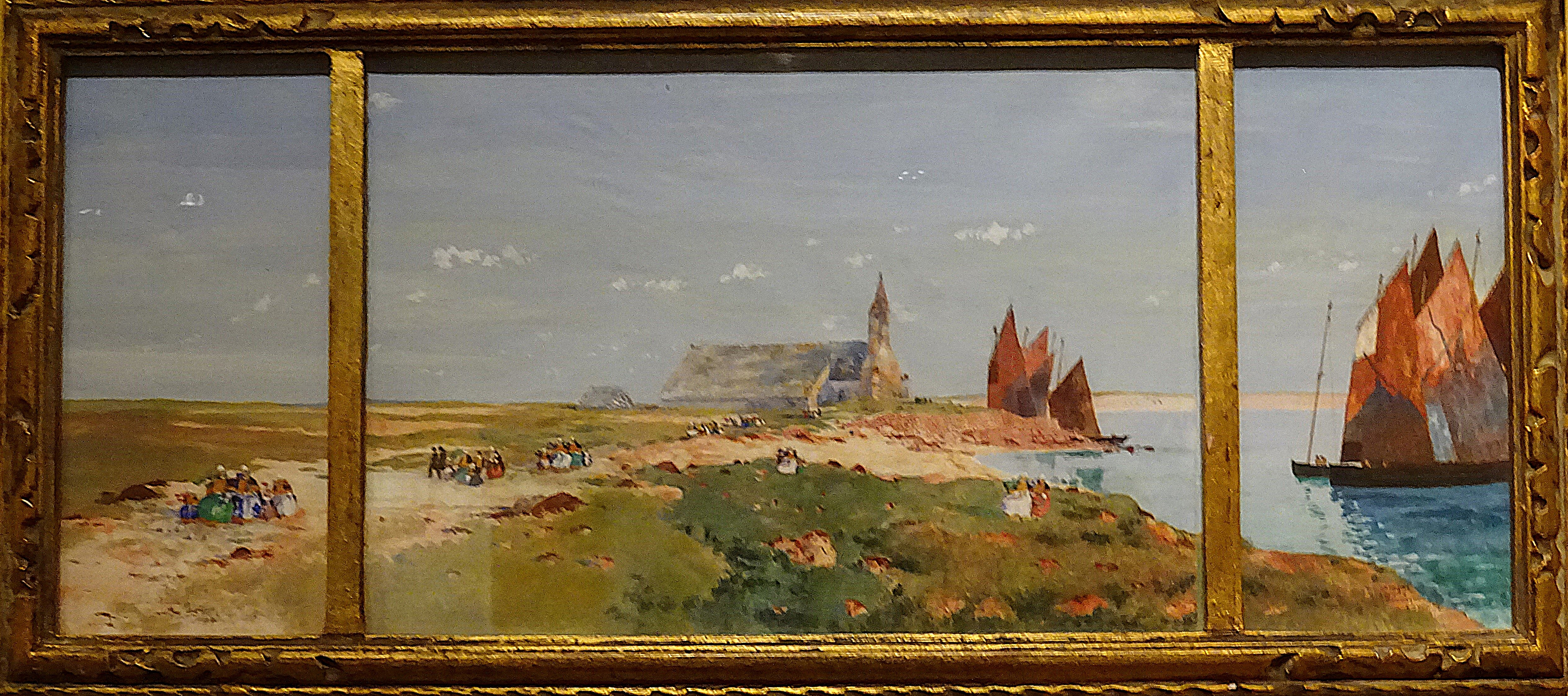
Chapelle Notre-Dame-de-la-Joie de Saint-Guénolé, Bretagne (watercolor and gouache on paper, not dated).

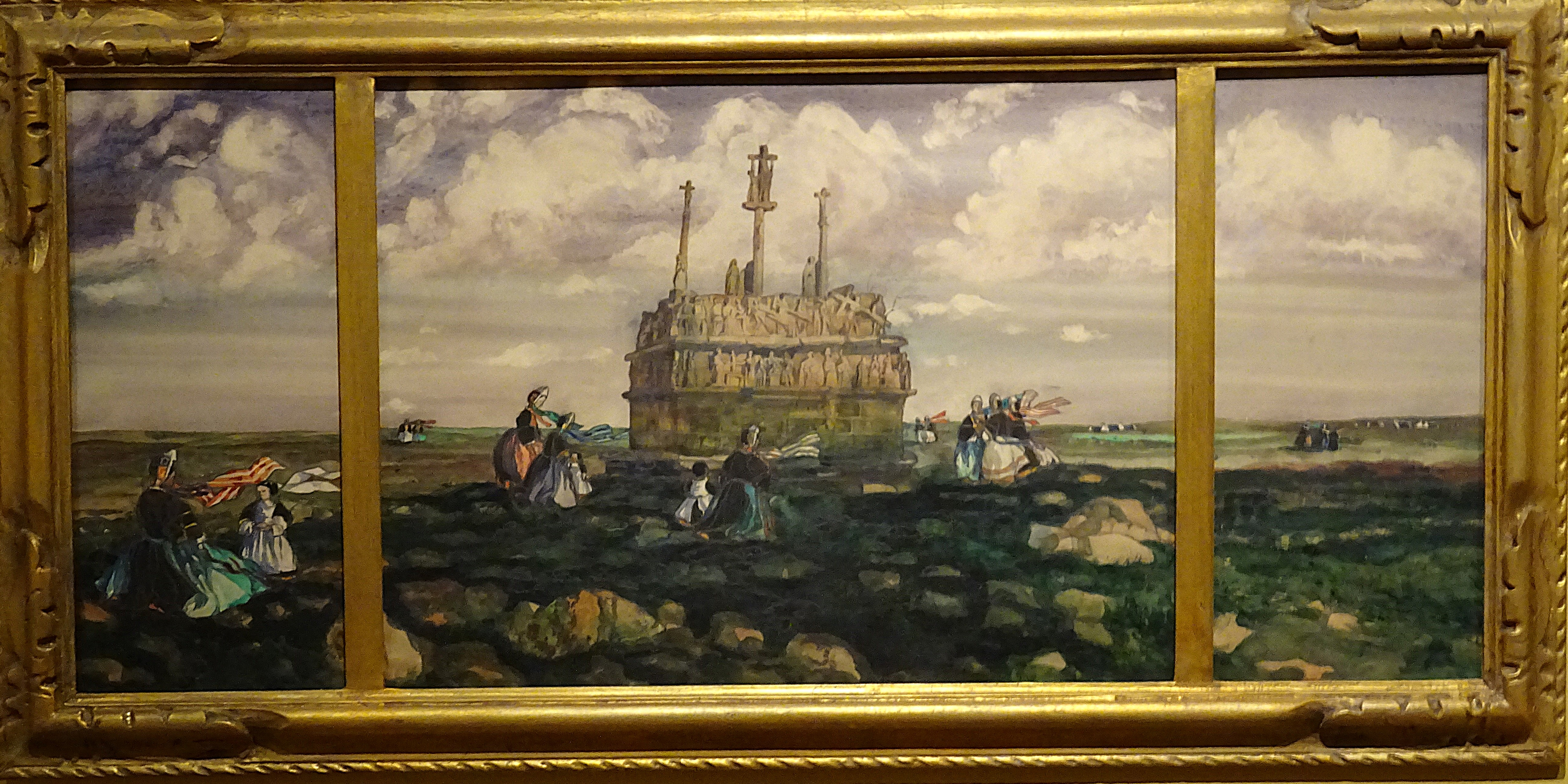
Les pèlerins au calvaire, Tronoën around 1930 (black lead, watercolor and gouache on paper).

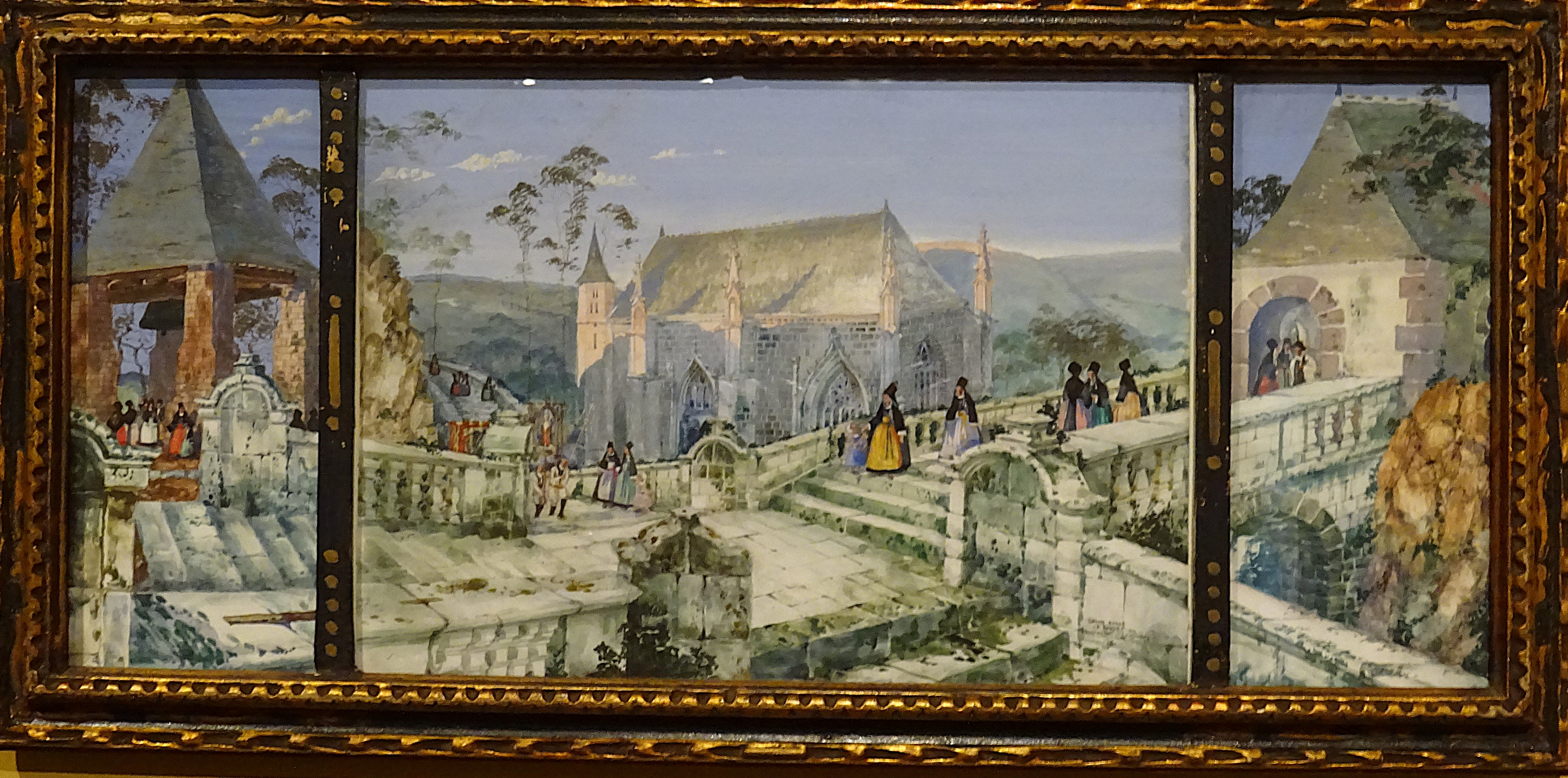
Le pardon de Sainte-Barbe, Le Faouët, around 1931 (watercolor and gouache on paper).
Maritime life
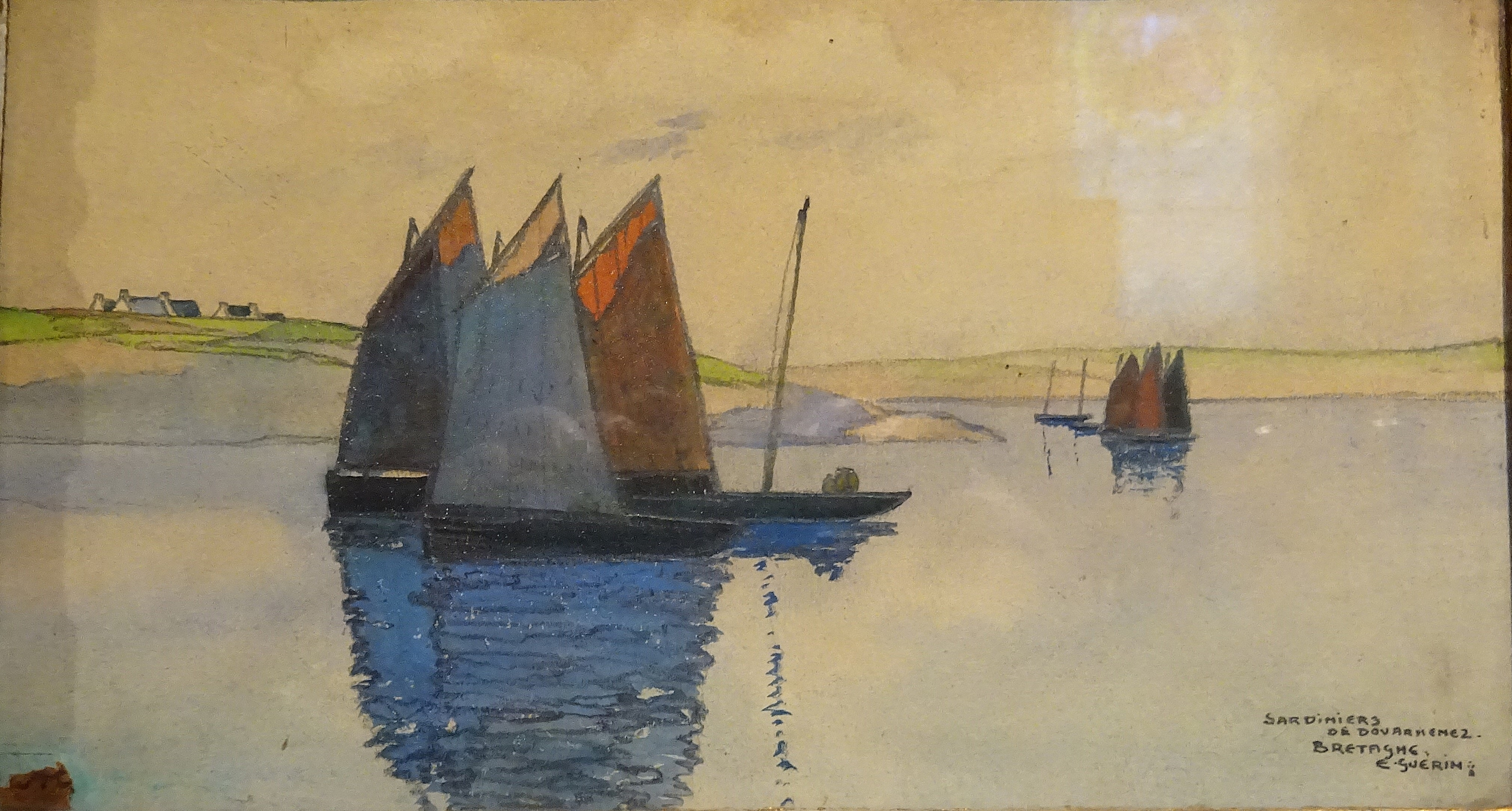
Sardiniers de Douarnenez (black lead, watercolor and gouache on paper, not dated).

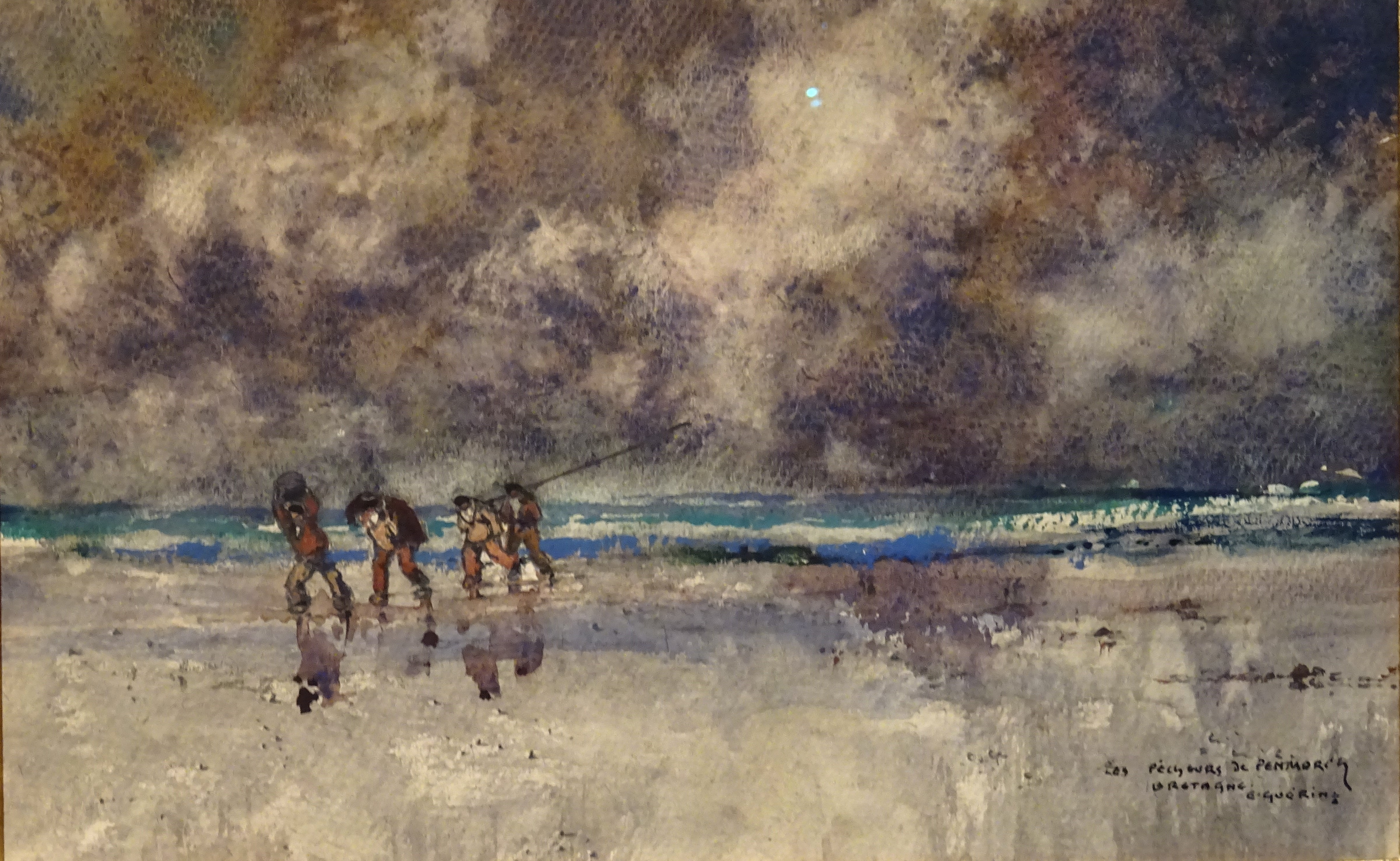
Les pêcheurs de Penmarc'h, Bretagne (black lead and watercolor on paper, not dated).

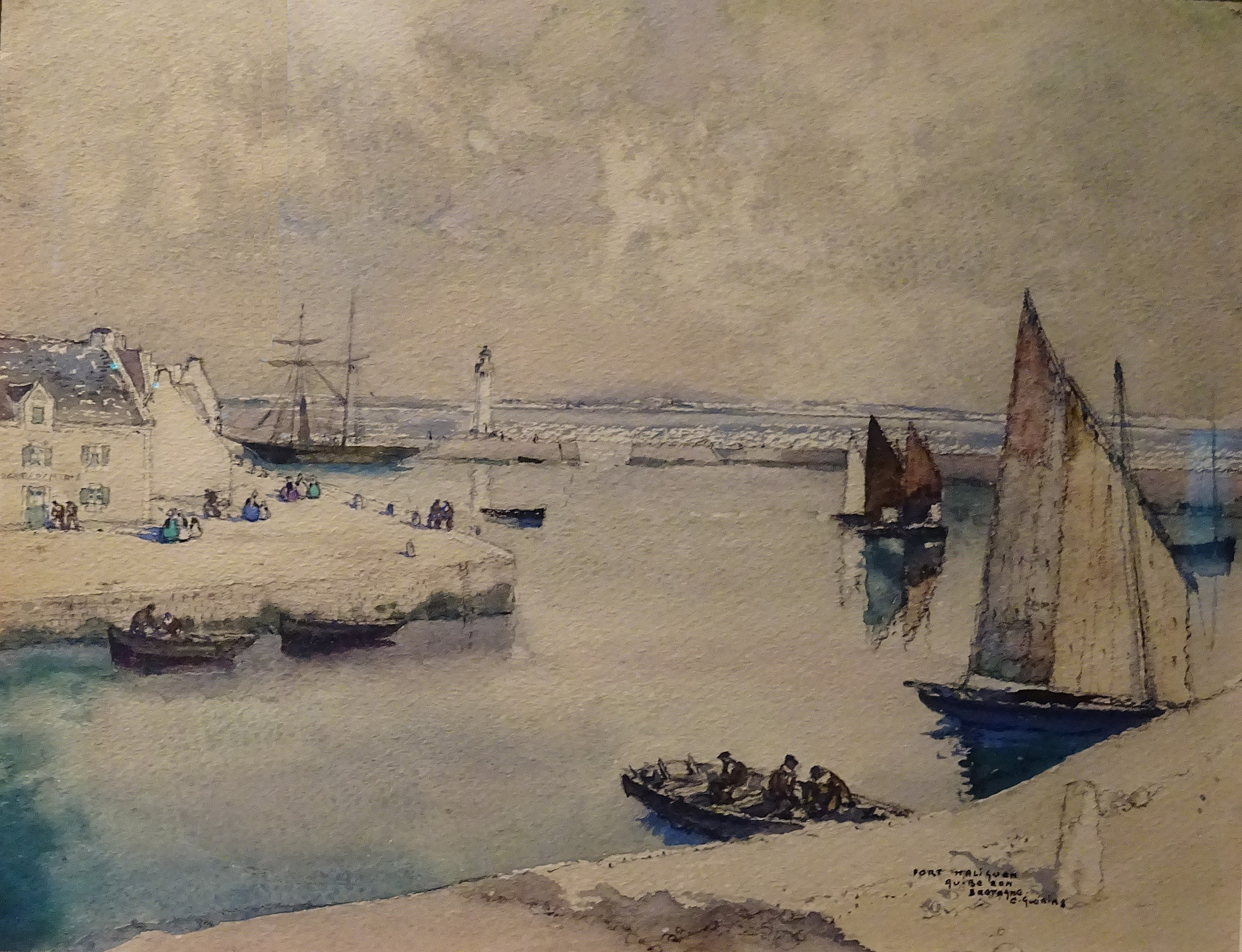
Port-Haliguen, Quiberon (watercolor on paper, not dated).

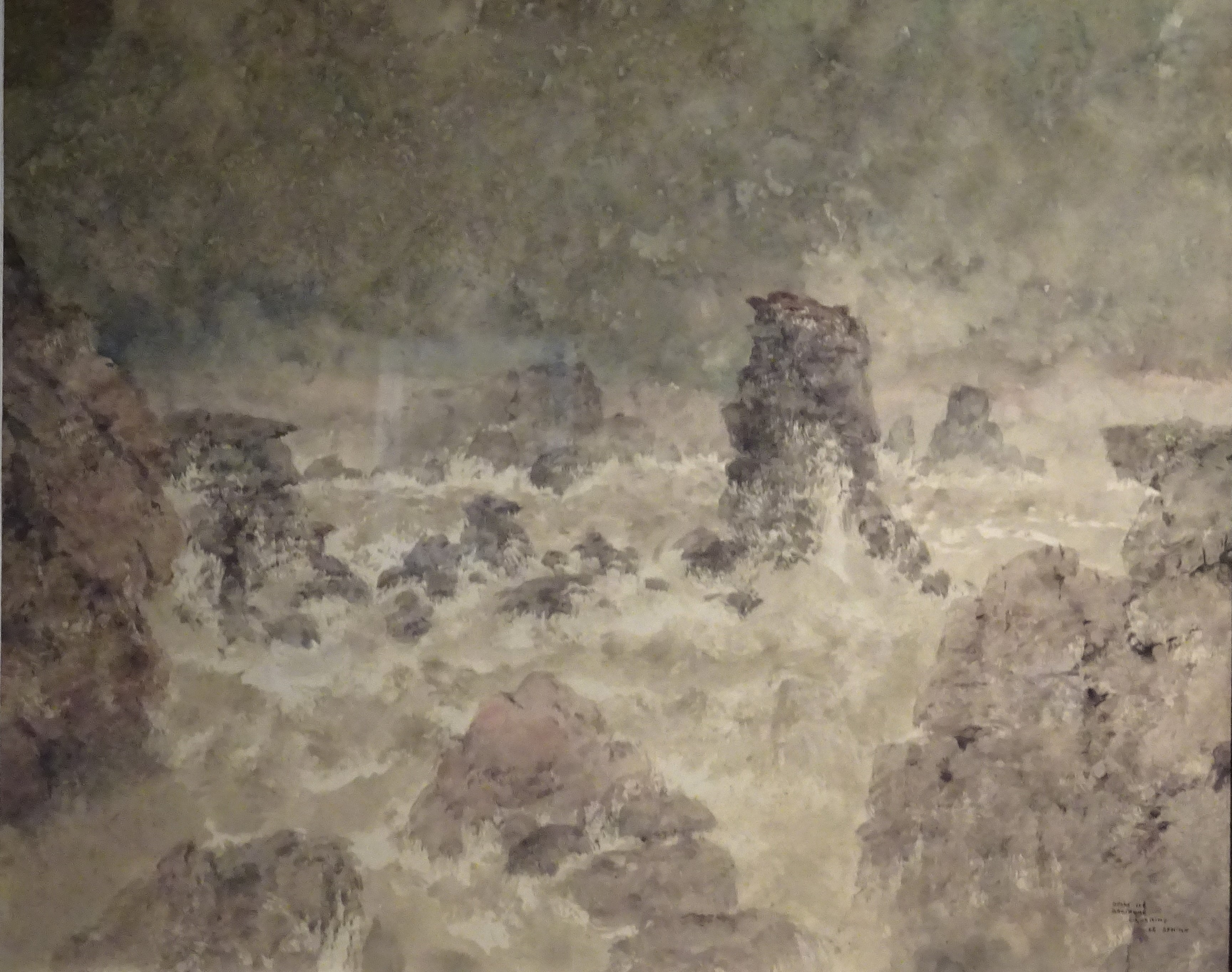
Le Sphinx, Belle-Île-en-Mer, Bretagne (watercolor on paper, not dated).
Medieval themes
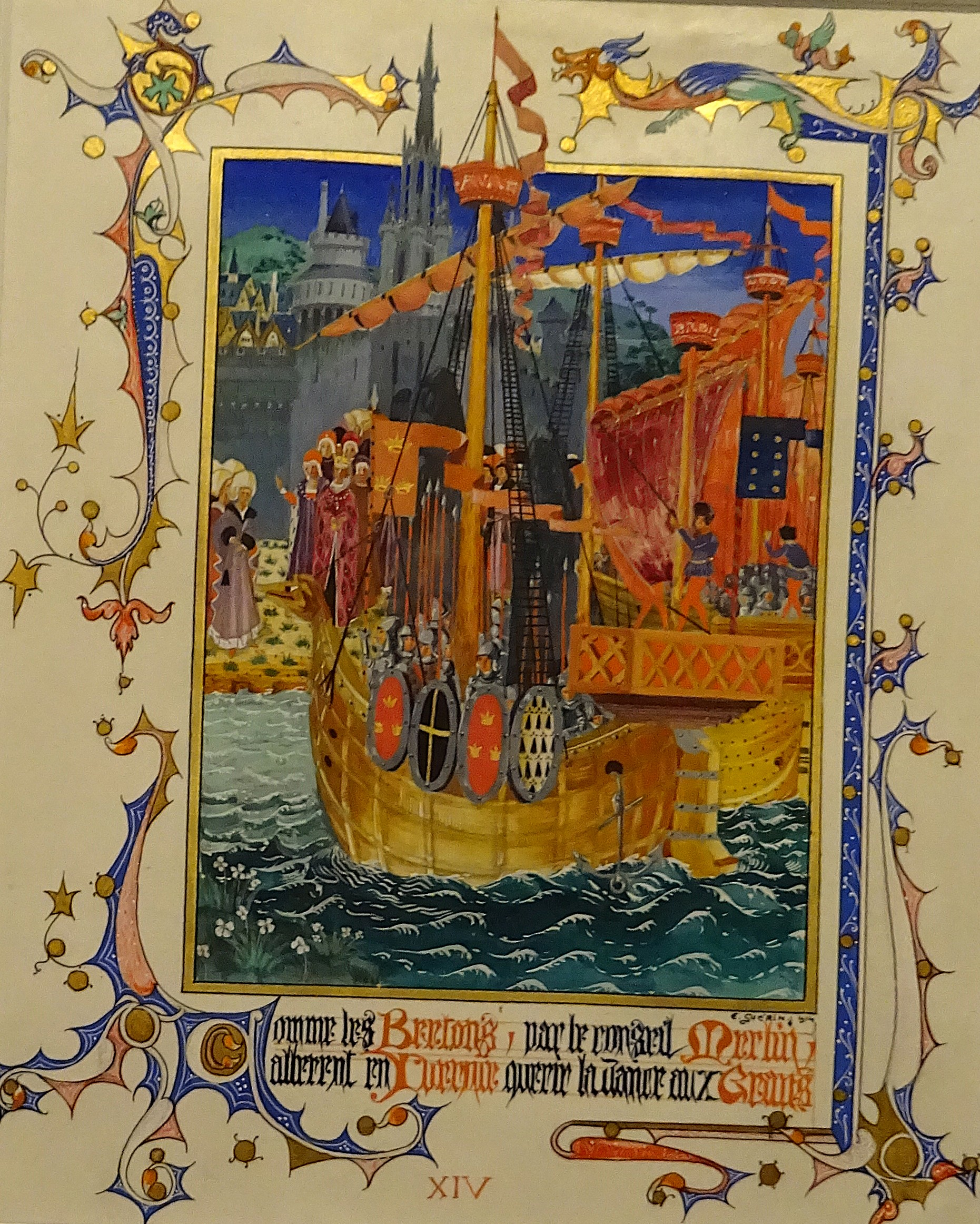
Comme les Bretons par le conseil Merlin, planche XIV, 1914 (arthurian cycle).

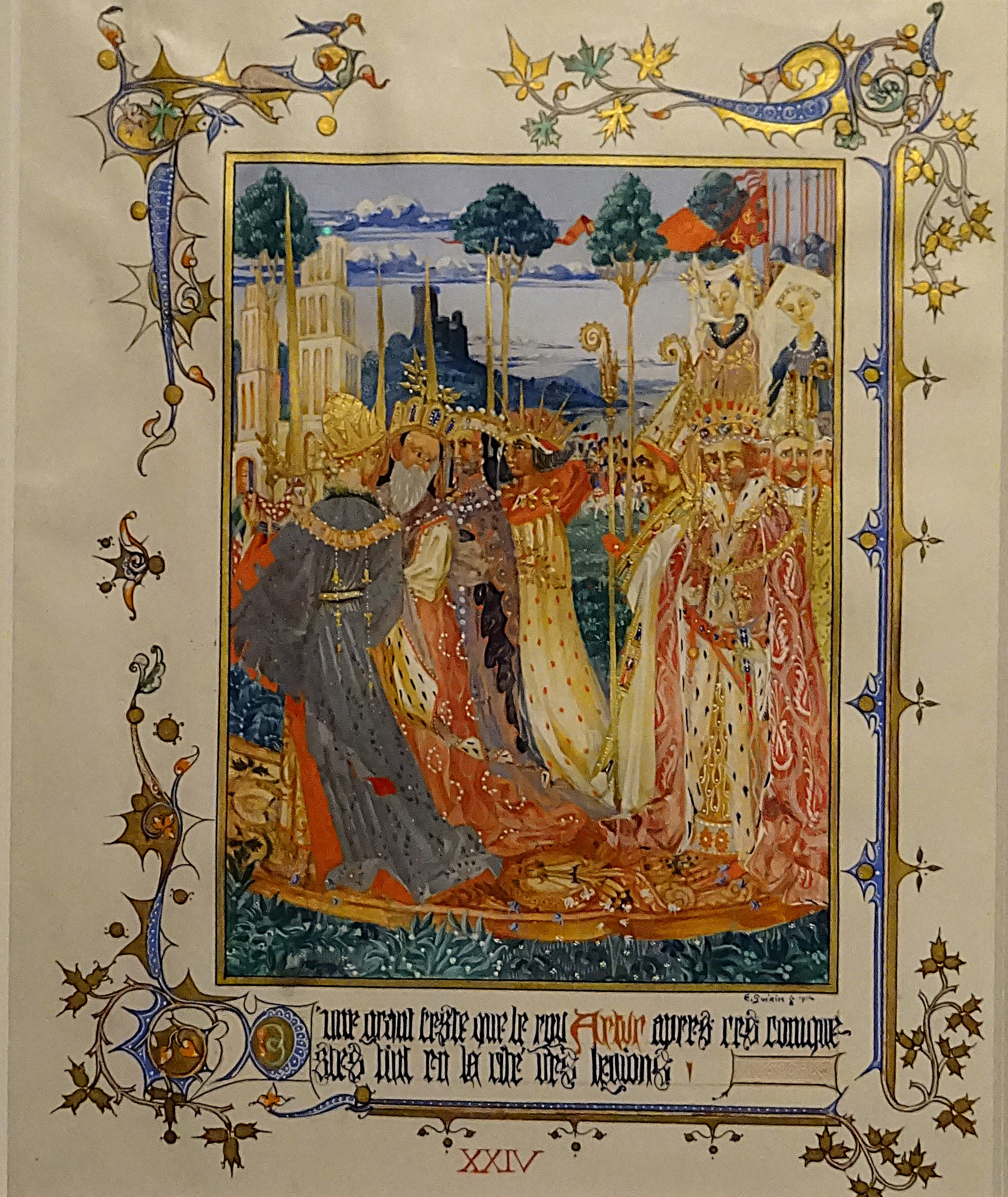
D'une grant feste que le roy Artur après ces conquestes tint en la cité des Lenions, plank XXIV, 1914 (arthurian cycle).

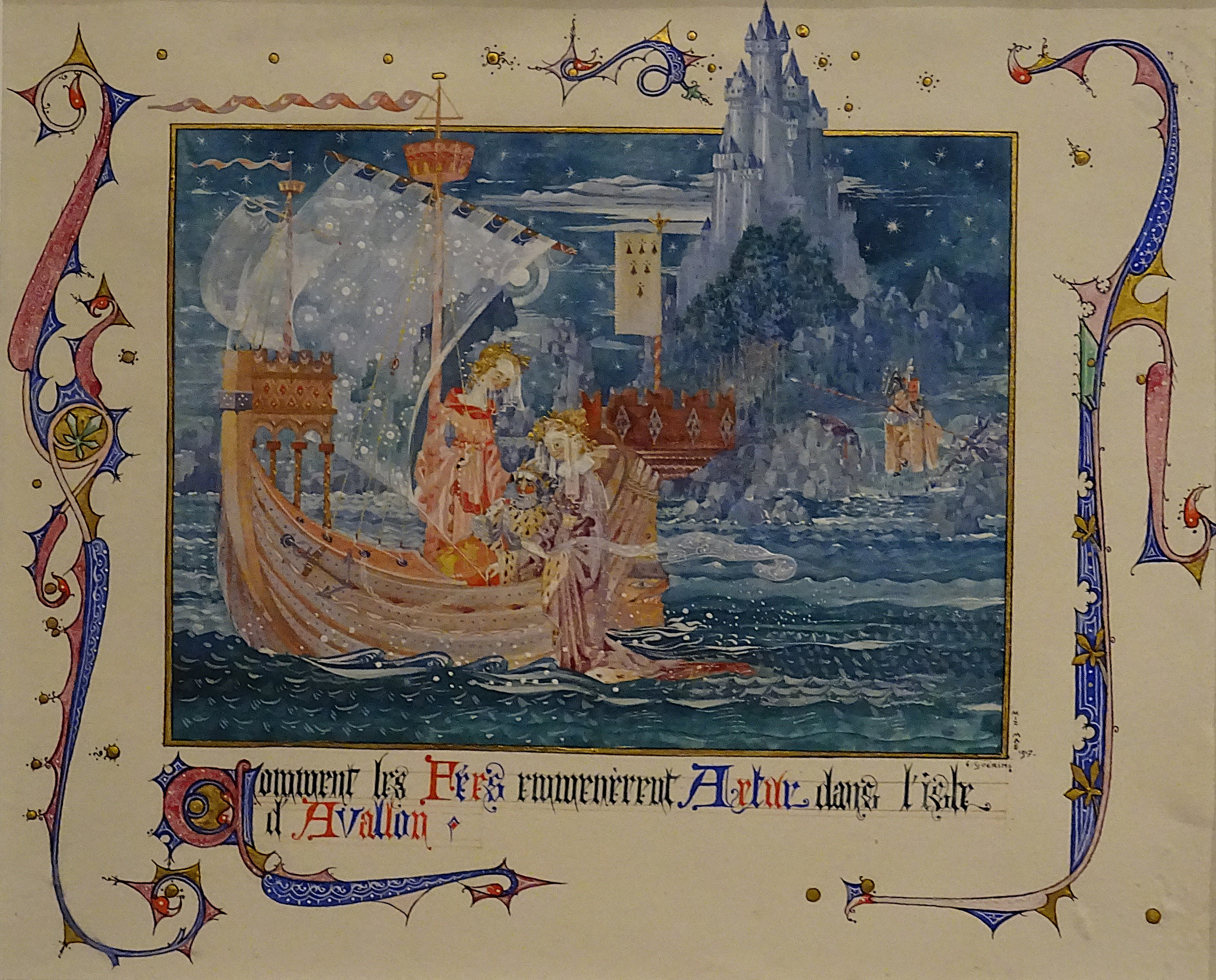
Comment les fées emmenèrent Artur dans l'isle d'Avallon, May 1917 (watercolor and gouache on doubled paper, arthurian cycle).

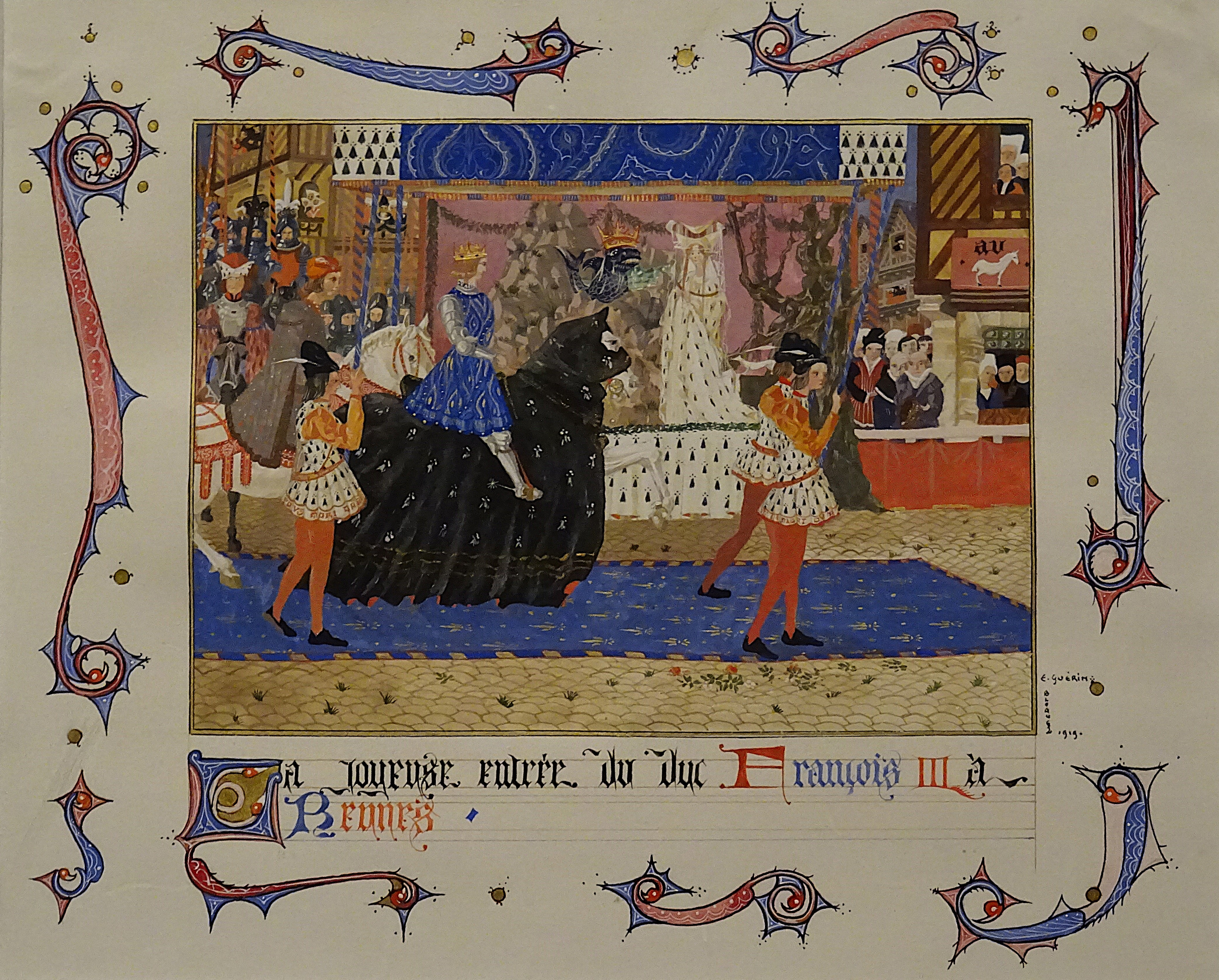
La joyeuse entrée du duc François III à Rennes, (1919, watercolor and gouache on vellum).

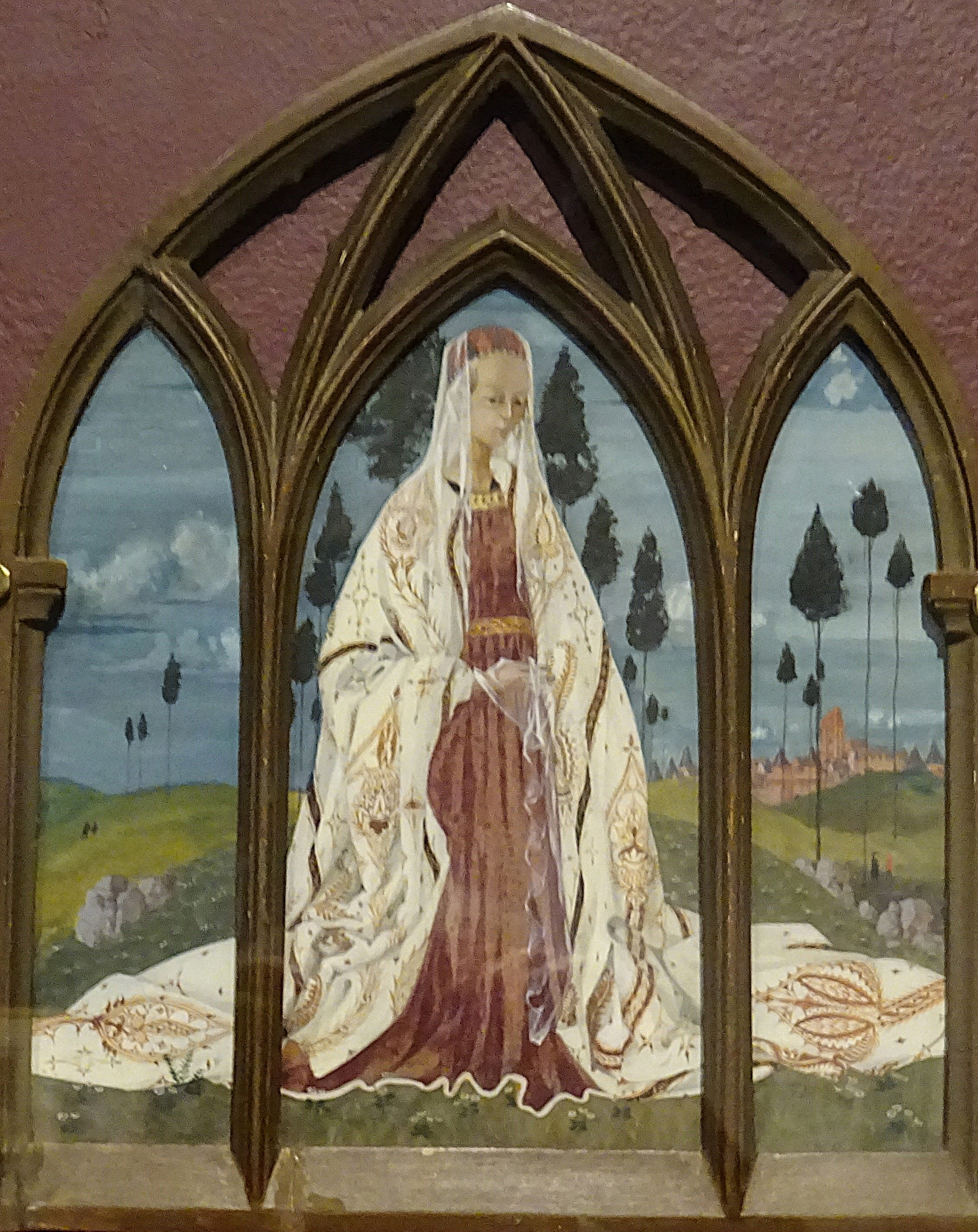
Marie de Keroulaz (watercolor and gouache on paper, not dated).
Religious themes
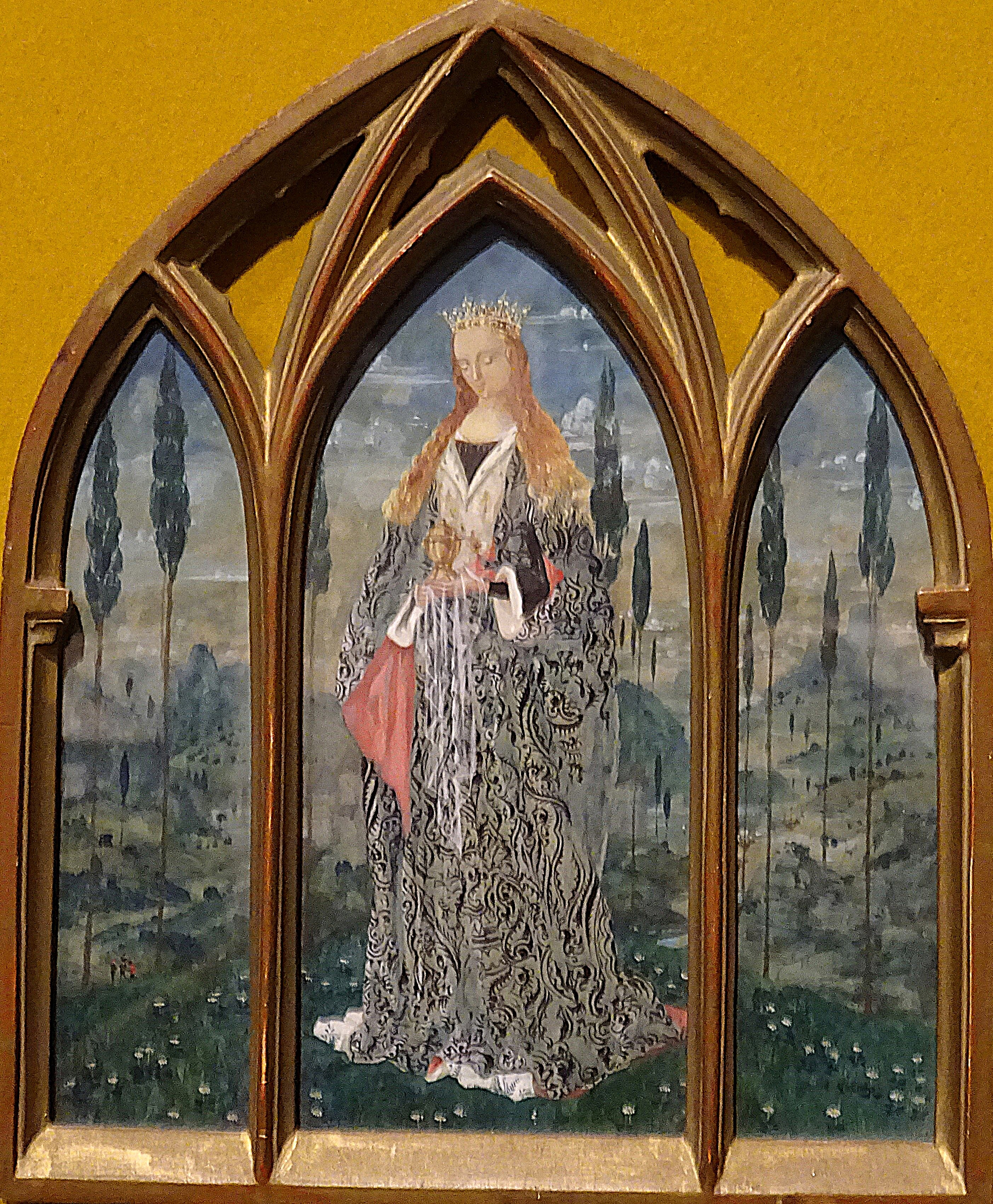
Sainte Gwenn (watercolor and gouache on paper, not dated).

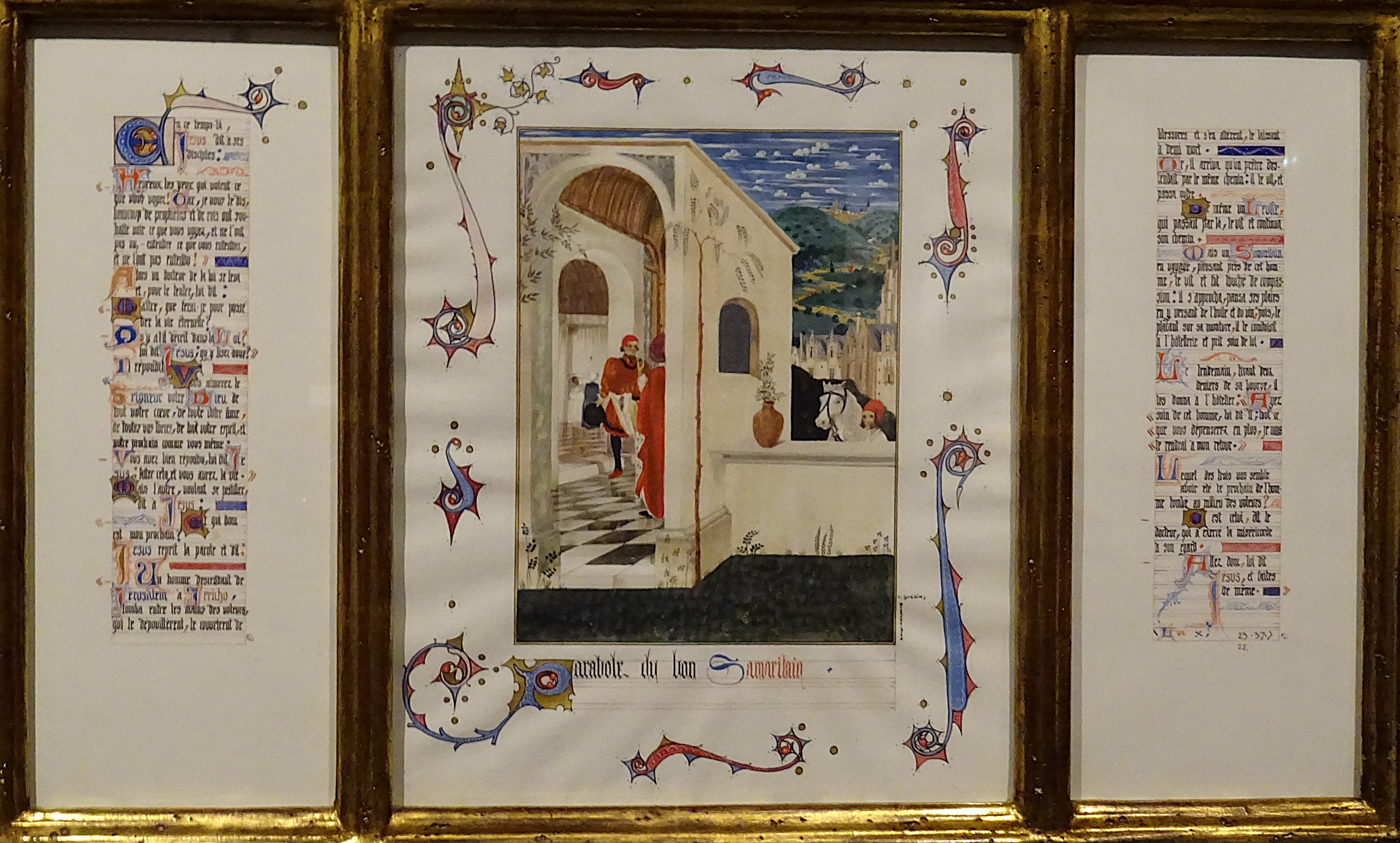
Parabole du Bon Samaritain (1920, Luke, chapter X, versets 25 to 37, plank of gospel, watercolor and gouache on vellum).

== Exhibitions ==
- 1913 : pavillon de Marsan, Louvre Palace, Paris
- 2001–2002 : Museum of Fine Arts of Rennes and Museum of Quimper
- 2005 : exhibition during the Art Festival of Saint-Briac-sur-Mer about different marine art painters including Roger Chapelet (1903–1995), Mathurin Méheut (1882–1958) and Ernest Guérin (1887–1952).
- 2024 : museum of Le Faouët.
