= Roger Chapelet =

French painter (1903–1995)

- Born: 25 September 1903; Versailles, France
- Died: 30 June 1995 (aged 91); Montpon-Ménestérol, France
- Known for: Painting

Albert Roger Édouard Chapelet (25 September 1903 – 30 June 1995) was a French maritime painter, from Versailles.

Originally from the Périgord province, he discovered his maritime passion boarding the Rollo in 1927, where his brother was a radio operator in the port of Marseilles. This was the beginning of his painting career at sea. He would then make a series of paintings in various ports: Le Havre, Antwerp, and Rotterdam. He sailed for the first time in 1929 to explore new horizons, and he boarded sailing boats to paint the fishermen on the banks of Newfoundland and Greenland. In the 1930s, he became the painter of the main French naval armaments, and in 1936, he was named Peintre de la Marine and became a member of the Naval Academy. During World War II, Chapelet served on the transatlantic convoys between 1939 and 1940. From 1942 to 1945, he served as commissioner of the navy in the Mediterranean, and in 1946, in Indochina. Meanwhile, he continued to paint different military operations and naval battles. He returned to civilian life after the war, and he became the painter of several ship companies: Mixed Company, Paquet, Compagnie Générale Transatlantique, National Navigation Company, etc.

He died in Montpon-Ménestérol, on 30 June 1995.

Along with Marin-Marie and Albert Brenet, Chapelet is considered one of the three great 20th-century painters of the French Navy. He is the father of international organist Francis Chapelet.
