= History of Jura salt =

History of salt formation and extraction in the Jura department of France

History of Jura Salt
- Formation: Late Triassic (215 million years ago)
- Key Sites: Salins-les-Bains, Lons-le-Saunier, Montmorot, Arc-et-Senans, Grozon, Poligny
- UNESCO Sites: Salins-les-Bains Saltworks, Royal Saltworks at Arc-et-Senans

The history of Jura salt refers to the geological formation and extraction of salt in the Jura department, specifically within the Franche-Comté salt basin, dating back to the Late Triassic period.

Salt extraction in the Jura region began in prehistoric times and was well-established by the Latin antiquity. It became a significant source of wealth in the 6th century when King Sigismund of Burgundy donated rights to the saltworks of Salins to the Abbey of Agaune in present-day Valais, Switzerland. By the 10th century, these saltworks fell under the feudal control of the Seigneury of Salins, acquired by the House of Chalon-Arlay in the 13th century. In the 15th and 16th centuries, the Salins saltworks, the only active saltworks at the time, were restructured into a royal monopoly under the Spanish Habsburgs. Following the Conquest of Franche-Comté and the Treaty of Nijmegen in 1678, these rights were transferred to the French crown. However, the productivity of the Salins saltworks declined, and the need for vast wood resources to fuel the boilers led to the establishment of the Royal Saltworks at Arc-et-Senans near the Chaux forest, with brine transported via a 21 kilometres (13 mi) brine pipeline. Operations at Arc-et-Senans began in 1779 and ceased in 1895.

During the medieval period, salt springs at Grozon and Lons-le-Saunier were exploited but abandoned in the 14th century due to low profitability. In the modern era, extraction resumed at Montmorot, near Lons-le-Saunier, where a saltworks was established in 1752, operating until 1966. In the mid-19th century, new extraction sites were developed, such as the Grozon saltworks, which operated until 1944 alongside local coal mining, and a brine extraction site at Poligny to supply the Solvay factory in Tavaux near Dole.

By the late 20th century, Jura salt was primarily used in thermalism at sites like Lons-le-Saunier and Salins-les-Bains. The region's salt heritage is preserved through initiatives like the Salt Museum in Salins-les-Bains and the transformation of the Arc-et-Senans saltworks into a cultural center, both recognized as UNESCO World Heritage Sites.

== Jura rock salt ==
Formation of the salt and coal deposits in Franche-Comté.

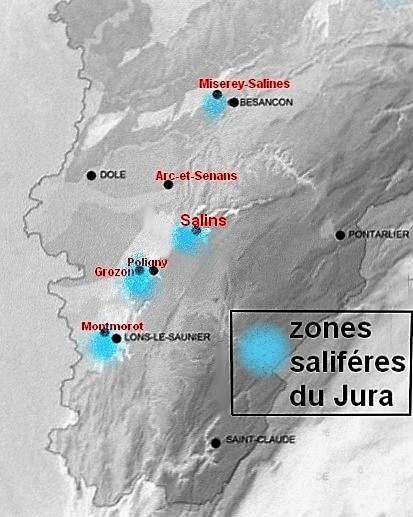
Map of salt sites in the Jura Massif.

During the Late Triassic (approximately 215 million years ago), the Panthalassa ocean, covering eastern France as part of the Pangaea supercontinent, receded, leaving a shallow brine lagoon. Through evaporation, this formed a thick layer of over 100 metres (330 ft) of evaporite (containing rock salt), later covered by over 200 metres (660 ft) of marl and limestone through sedimentation. The Jura Massif formed about 35 million years ago during the Priabonian due to compression and folding from the Alps to the west. The evaporite layer rose closer to the surface in some areas due to folding and erosion. Water infiltrated the ground, circulated through salt deposits, and re-emerged as resurgences.

The main rock salt deposits in the Jura Massif are concentrated in three key areas. The southern zone, along the foothills of the Revermont, is the most significant, with major sites at Lons-le-Saunier-Montmorot and Salins-les-Bains, alongside deposits at Tourmont, Grozon, and Poligny. A less rich northern zone near Besançon spans from Montferrand-le-Château to Châtillon-le-Duc, including the Pouilley-les-Vignes Saltworks and Miserey-Salins Saltworks. The third zone, in northeastern Haute-Saône near the Doubs and Territoire de Belfort, lies within the Keuper coal basin of Haute-Saône around Villersexel and the Porte de Bourgogne, historically linked to the Principality of Montbéliard. Notable sites include Saulnot, Gouhenans, Athesans-Étroitefontaine, and Mélecey.

Large-scale, long-term production focused primarily on sites in the Jura department, with Salins (later renamed Salins-les-Bains in 1926) and Lons-le-Saunier/Montmorot being the most prominent. Other zones saw limited exploitation, mainly in the 19th century. Salt production involved evaporating brine from deep sources using heat, a process known as igneous salt production, with technological advancements over the centuries.

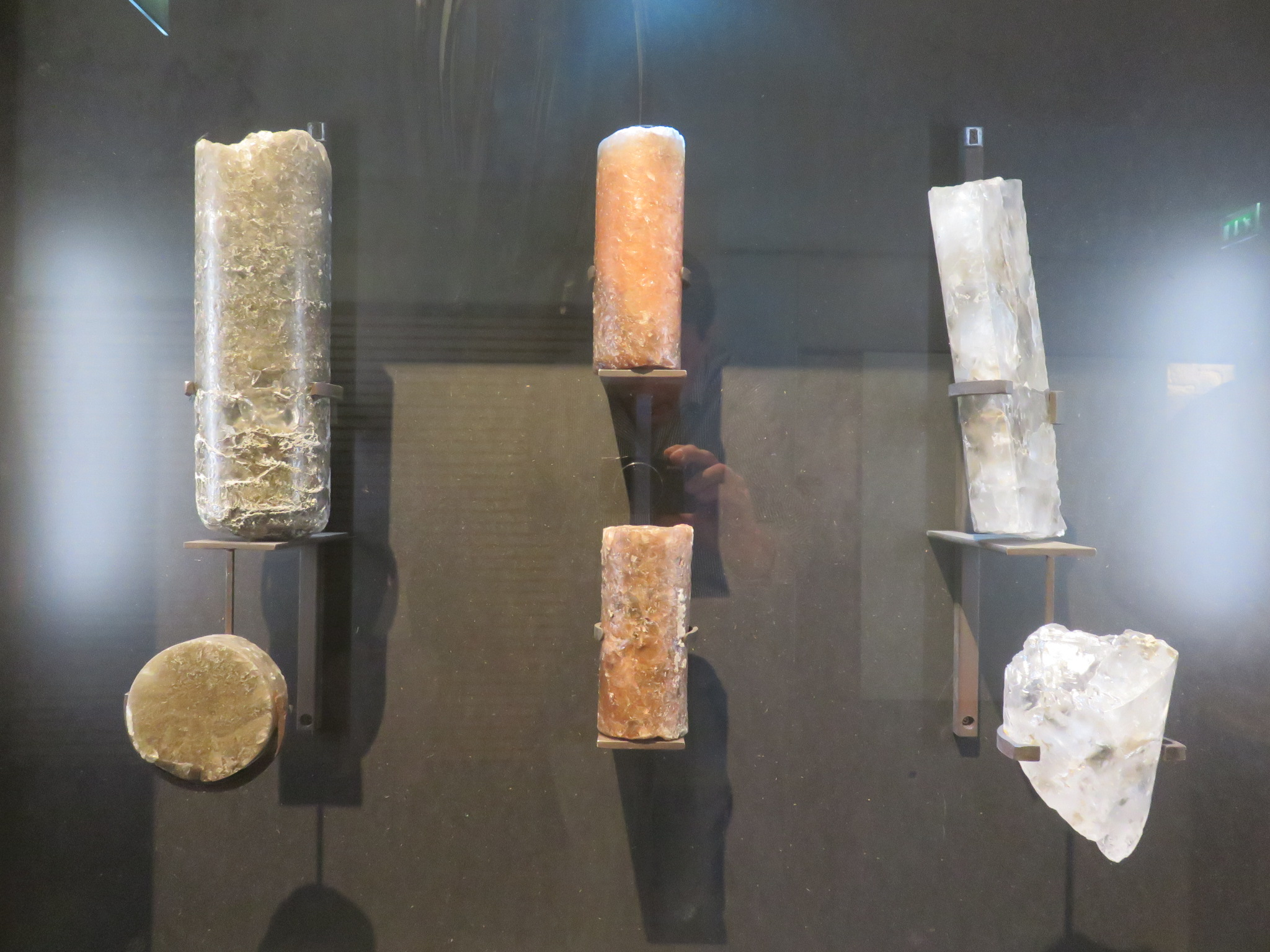
Core samples of evaporite.

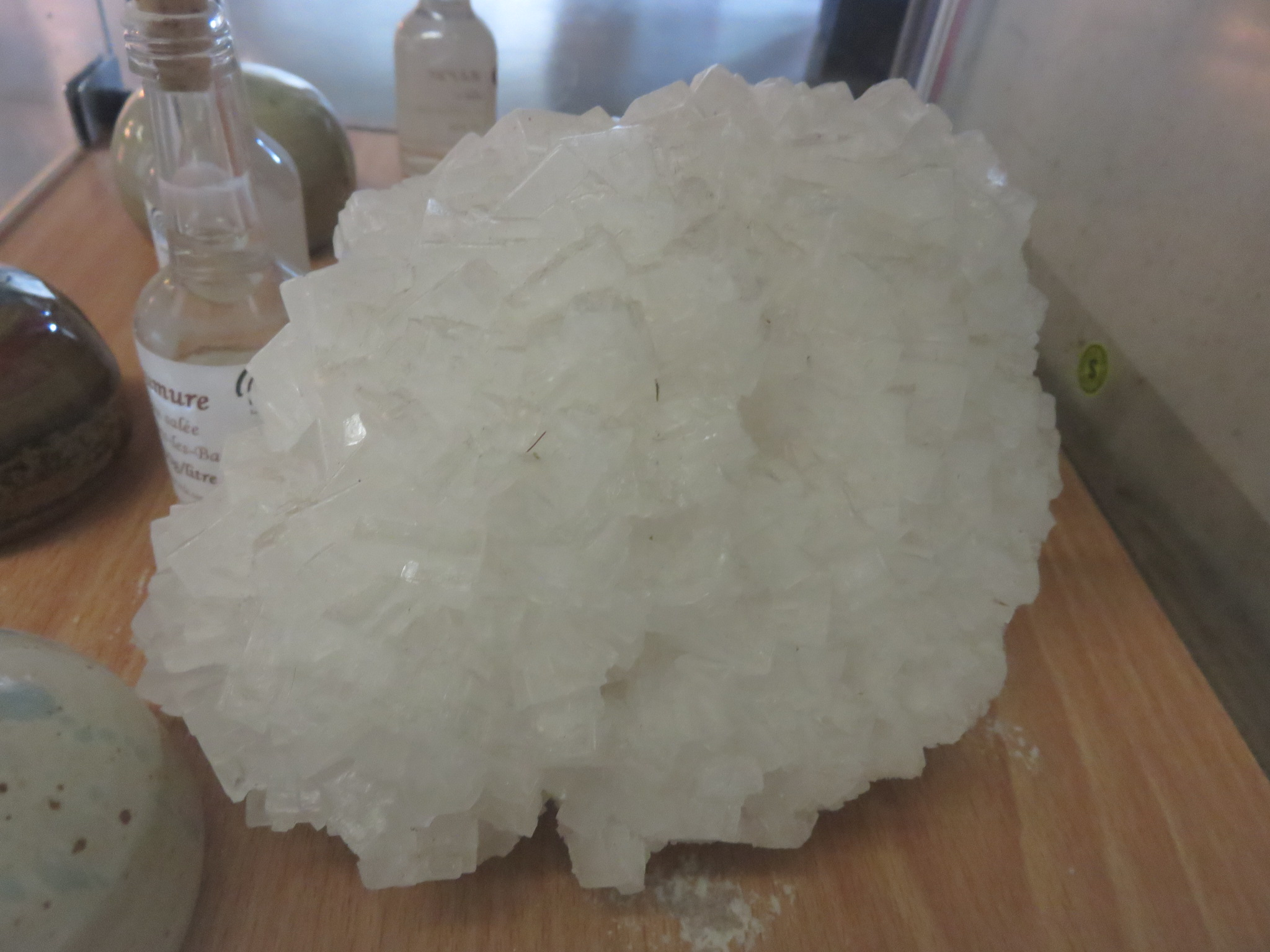
Crystallization.

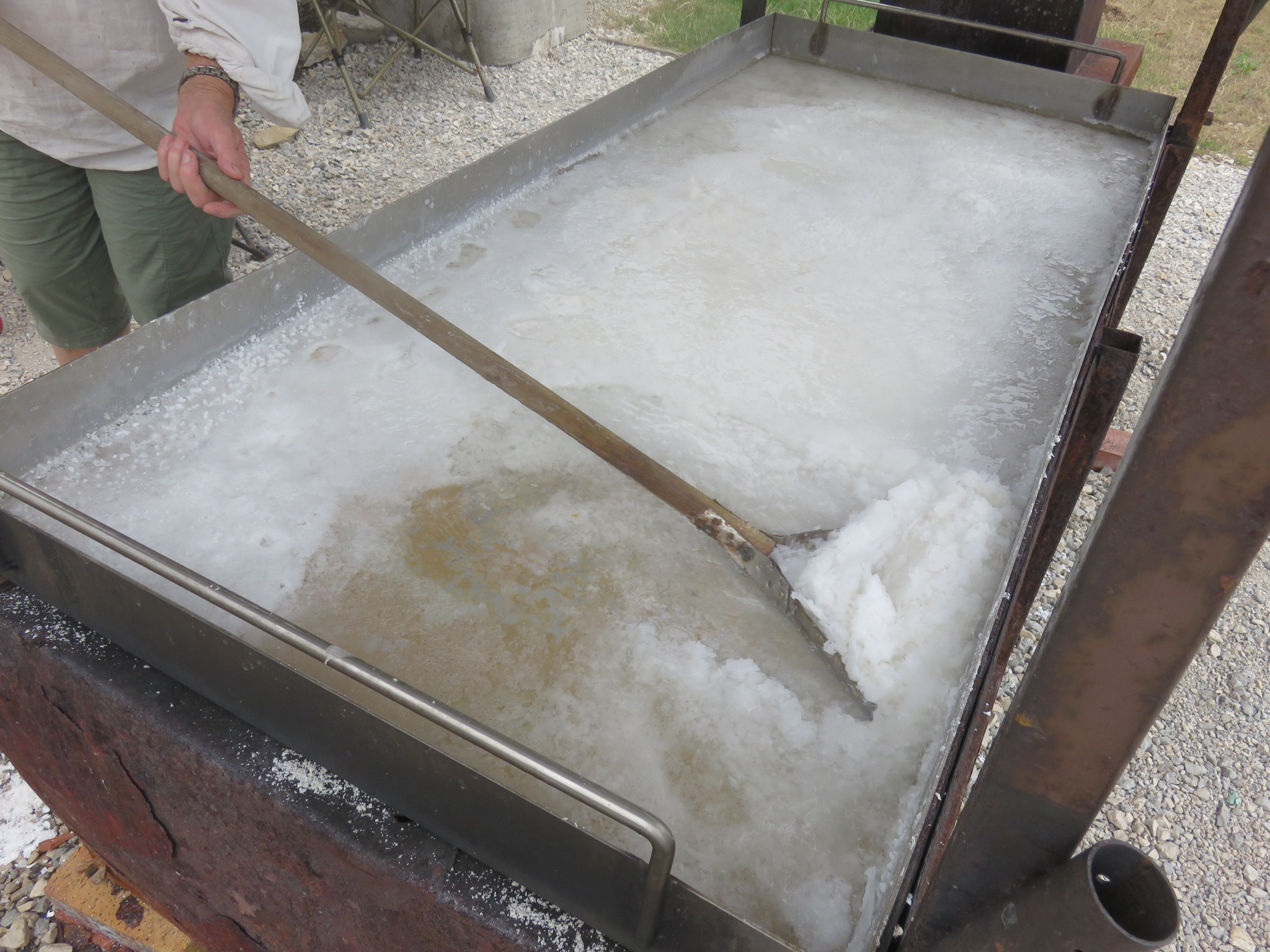
Brine.

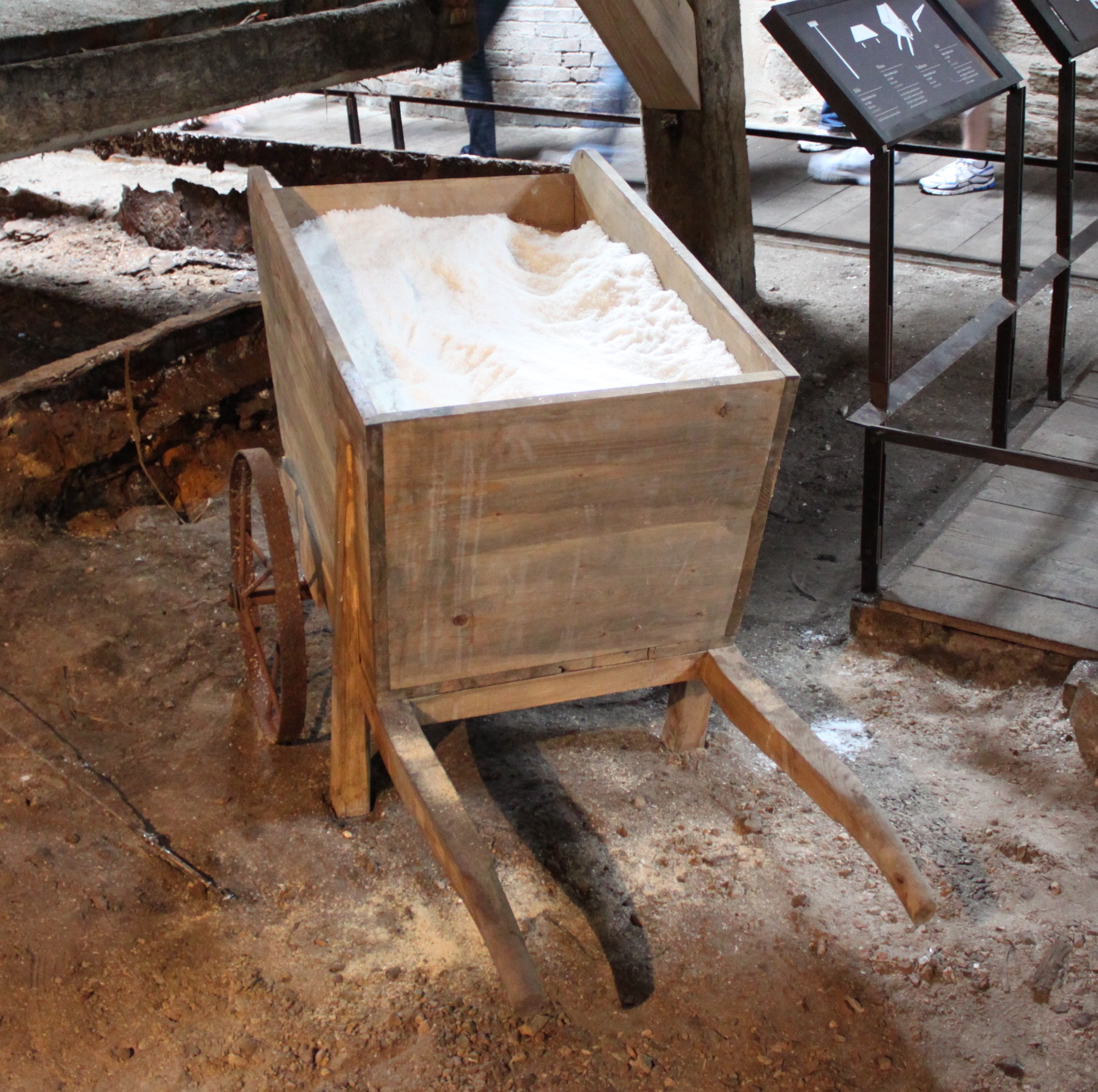
Igneous salt (fire-produced salt).

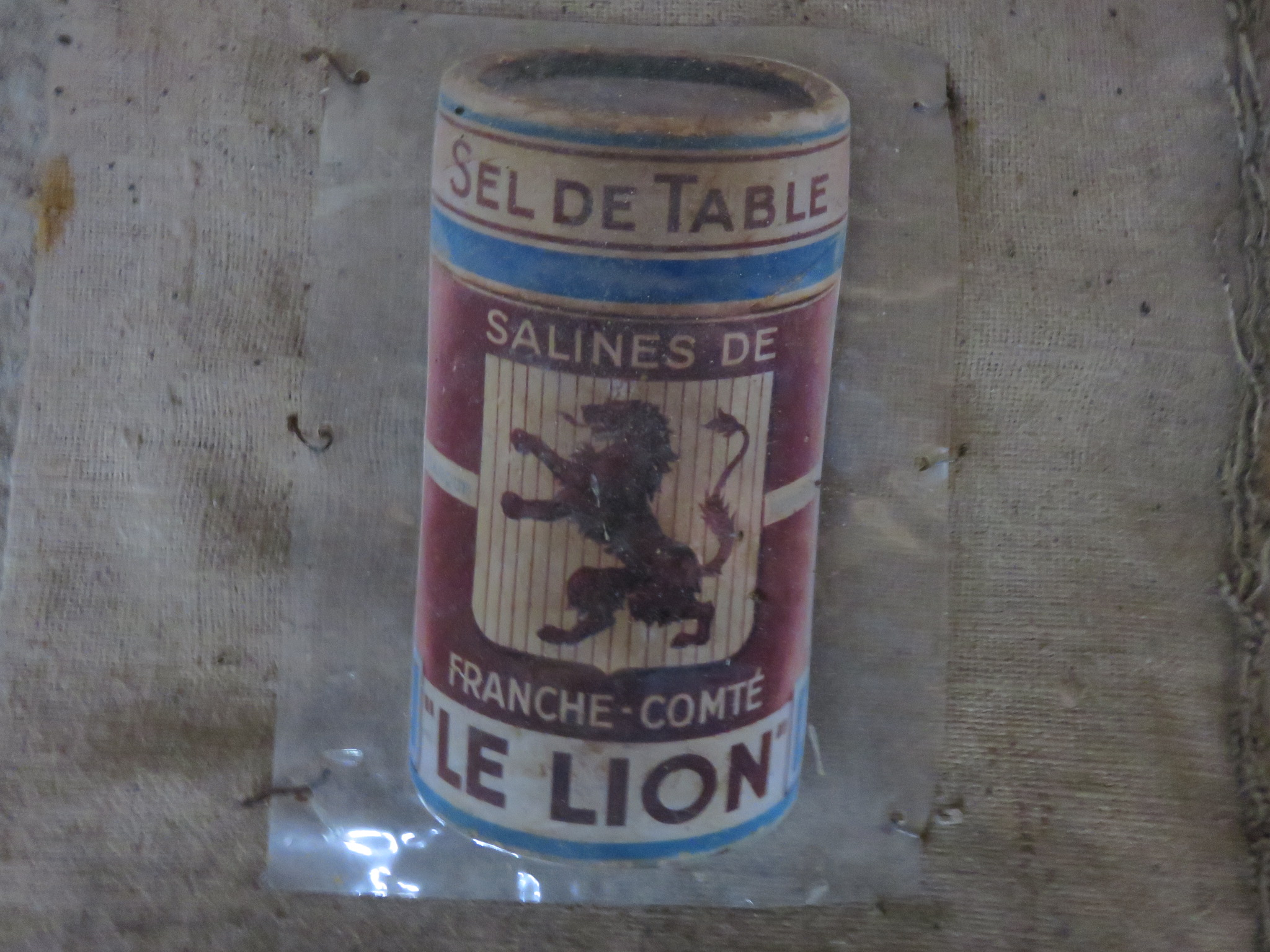
Old packaging for edible salt.

== Salins, the center of the Jura salt ==
During its primary salt-producing period, the town was known as Salins, adopting its current name, Salins-les-Bains, in 1926. The name Salins is used here.

=== Development of salins before the Middle Ages ===
In Gaulish and Roman times, Jura salt was renowned for its use in salting meats exported to Rome, as noted by Strabo (58 BCE – 25 CE): "Ex Sequanis optima suilla salmenta Romam perfectur" ("From the Sequani comes the finest salted pork sent to Rome"). This likely refers to salt from Lons-le-Saunier, where springs were more accessible than those in Salins, though evidence of early brine use exists at Salins.

During the 5th-century barbarian invasions, the Burgundians established the Kingdom of Burgundy in 443, encompassing Salins. Amid conflicts with the Franks under Clovis I, King Sigismund, a Burgundian ruler, took refuge in the Abbey of Agaune, which he founded around 515 in present-day Valais. Around 522, he donated his substantial Jura holdings, including Salins and its saltworks, to the abbey, ensuring its prosperity for nearly four centuries. This donation is first documented in historical texts as "in Pago Bisuntinensi, Salinum cum Castra de Bracon Miegens," though authenticity is uncertain, with only 10th-century copies surviving. A papal bull attributed to Pope Adrian I in 773 reportedly confirmed this possession.

Little is known about Salins during the Early Middle Ages. The Abbey of Condat held interests in the saltworks, as confirmed by a charter from Lothair I in 844/854. An ancient salt route also passed through Salins, connecting Dijon and its Abbey of Saint-Bénigne to Saint-Maurice-d’Agaune in Valais.

=== The Salins fief ===
Coat of arms of the House of Chalon-Arlay, 13th–14th centuries.

Around 940/942, the Abbey of Agaune was forced to enfeoff its Jura holdings to Aubry I of Mâcon, Count of Mâcon, establishing the Seigneury of Salins. By the 11th century, the seigneury was prominent, passing to the Duke of Burgundy in 1224 and, through an exchange in 1237, to John I of Chalon, the first of the House of Chalon-Arlay. This ownership granted the lords of Salins regional dominance through salt revenues, which supported abbeys like Cluny, Balerne, Goailles, Rosières, Bonlieu, and Buillon, as well as vassals and allies such as the House of Joux, Usier, Pesmes, Montbéliard, and Montfaucon. Salt revenues also funded castles to control salt routes to Pontarlier, Switzerland, and the Jura wine region, including Vadans, Pin, and Arlay Castle, which gave the Chalon-Arlay family its name. Gaucher II, the first to hold the title of Lord of Salins, was described in 1084 as "Dei gratia Advocatus oppidi Salinensis" (By the grace of God, advocate of the town of Salins).

Other Jura salt sites, such as Grozon and Lons-le-Saunier, were exploited by monastic owners like the Balerne Abbey monks but were abandoned in the 14th century in favor of the more productive Salins.

=== Traditional salt production in Salins ===
Initially, Salins had a single brine source, which became the Great Saunerie or Bourg-Dessus saltworks. Enfeoffed in the 10th century by the Abbey of Agaune to Aubry I, it was acquired in 1237 by John I of Chalon, known as Jean l’Antique, of the House of Chalon-Arlay. A secondary unit, the "Chauderette de Rosières," was granted to the Rosières Abbey in the late 12th century but returned to the Counts of Chalon in 1249. This produced the distinct "Rosière salt." A third unit, the Petite Saunerie or Bourg-Dessous saltworks, also known as the "puits à muire," emerged later and was collectively owned by ecclesiastical, noble, and bourgeois stakeholders.

Production methods remained consistent for centuries, involving the extraction of underground brine and its evaporation through heating. This required significant wood for boilers and substantial labor. A 160 metres (520 ft) underground gallery, built in the 13th century and modified until the 19th century, supported operations. Brine was extracted from wells about 20 metres (66 ft) deep, initially using a bucket-and-balance system, later replaced by a bucket-chain system powered by horse-driven winches, and by 1750, by hydraulic gears driven by the Furieuse river. Early extractions yielded brine with 30 grams per litre (4.8 oz/imp gal) salinity, increasing to 80 grams per litre (13 oz/imp gal) in the Middle Ages, though salinity declined over time (for comparison, the Mediterranean Sea has a salinity of 38 grams per litre (6.1 oz/imp gal)).

Brine was evaporated in large pans suspended over fires, as described in Diderot's Encyclopedia in 1765. Surface workshops, called "bernes," housed pans, boilers, wood storage, and forges. At its peak, the Great Saunerie had eight bernes, and the Petite Saunerie had five, each employing dozens of workers managing fires, raking salt, and forming salt blocks. A single batch required 17–18 hours, with 16 batches (a "remandure") taking 11–12 days of continuous work. The saltworks consumed vast amounts of wood, estimated at 35000 stères in the 17th century, with high transport costs.

Salt was shaped into blocks ("salignons") for Franche-Comté or granulated for export to Swiss cantons in barrels.

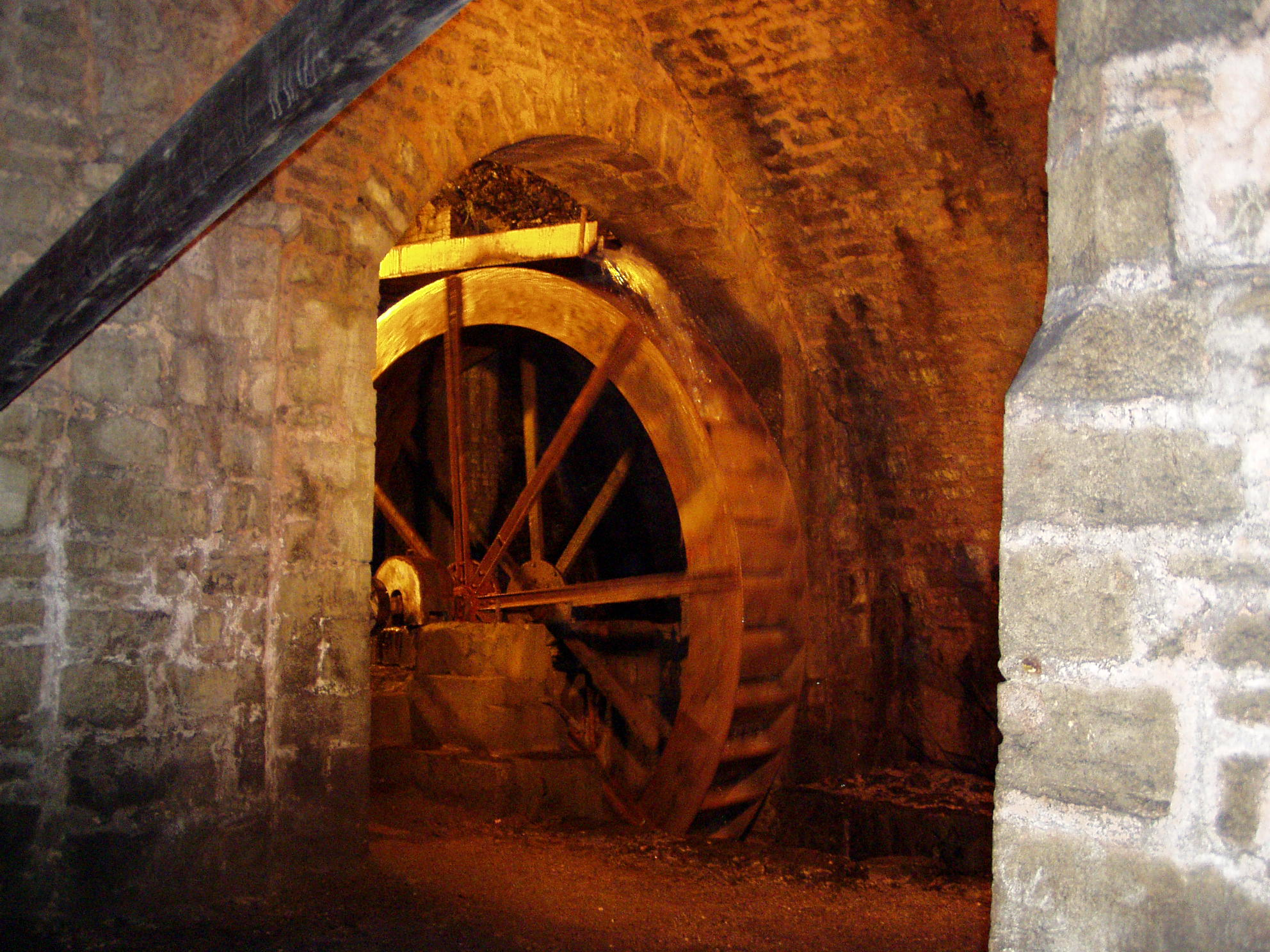
Waterwheel for brine extraction.

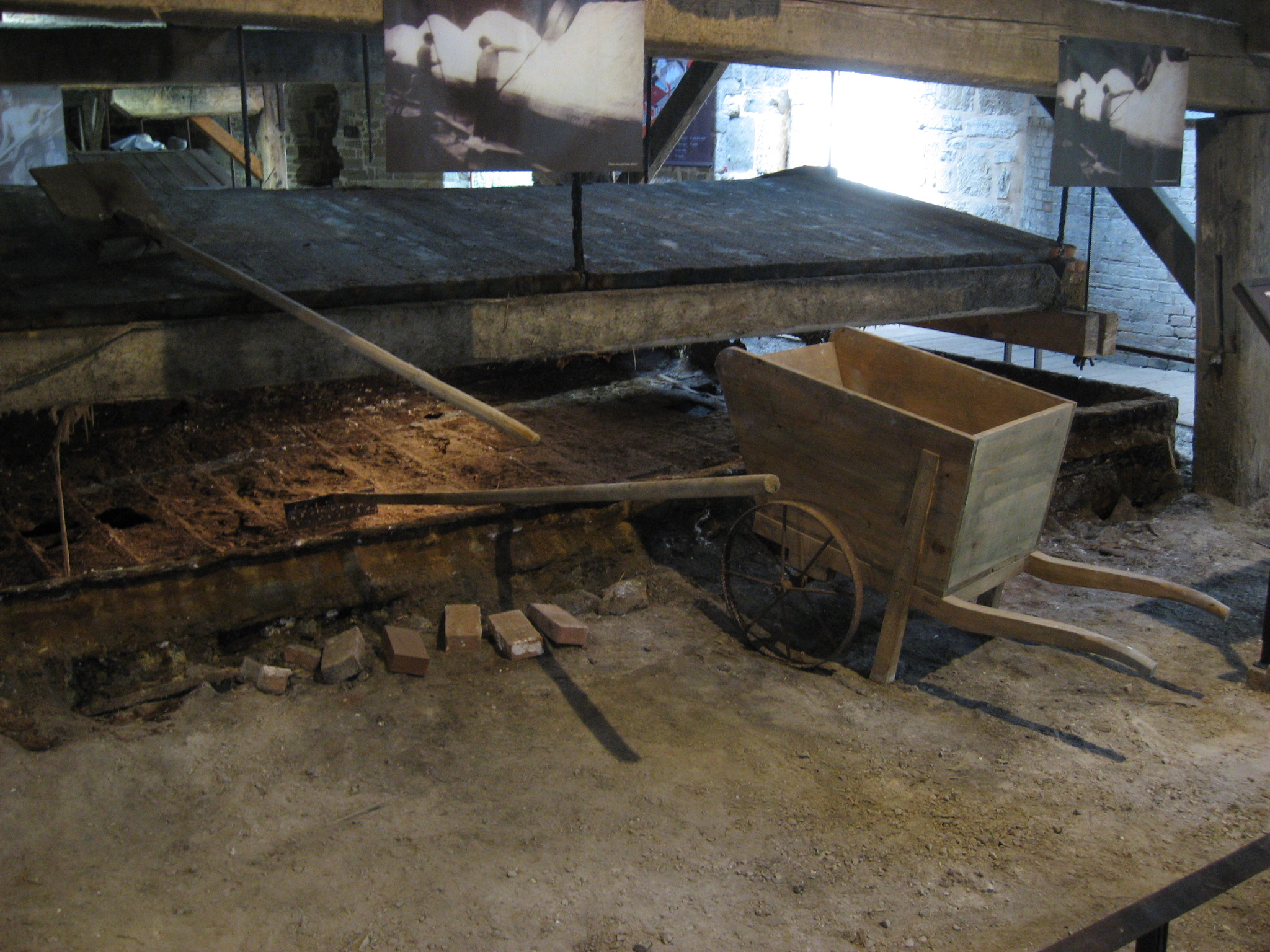
Tools.

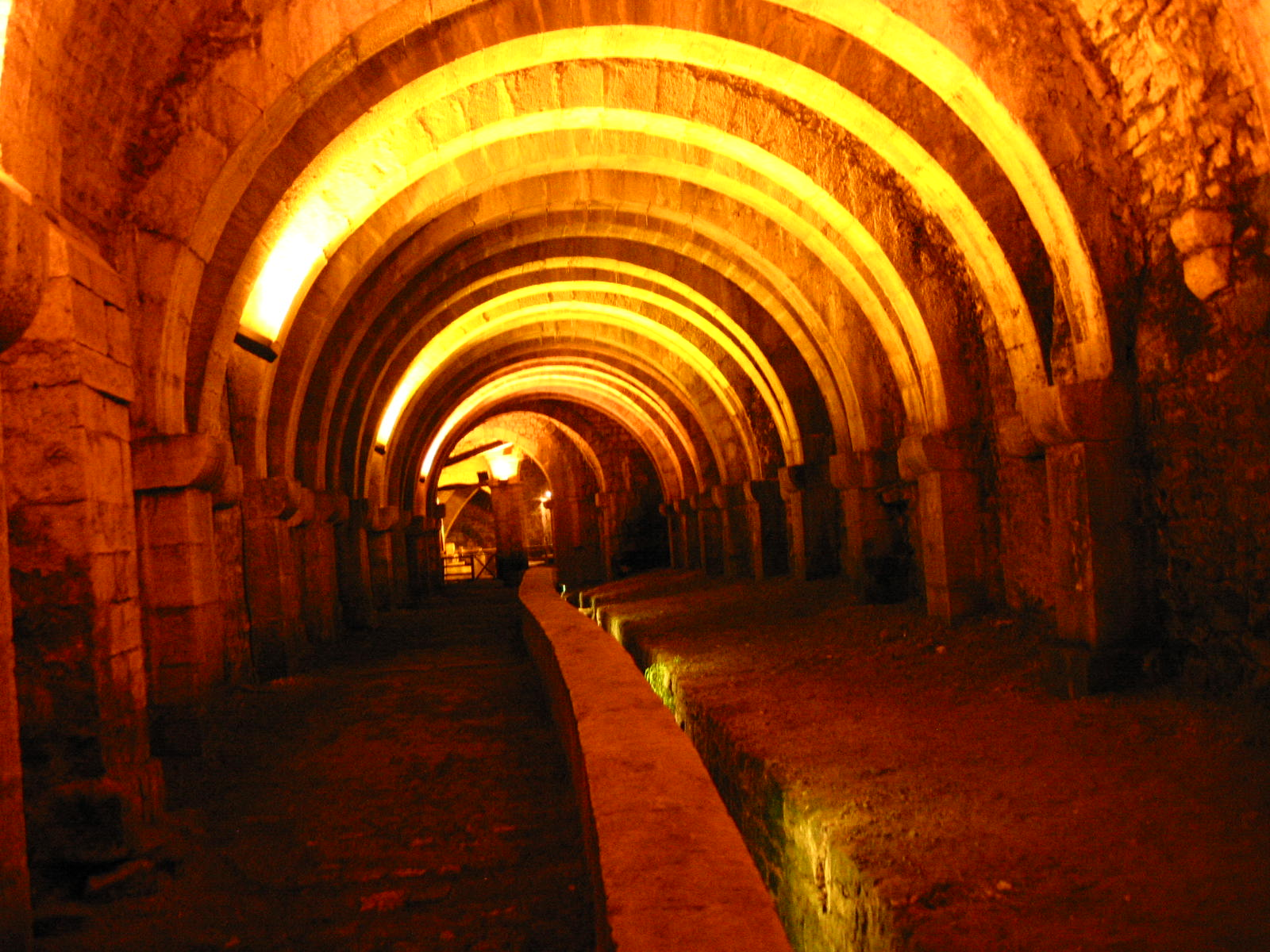
Underground gallery.

=== Consolidation of operations in the late 16th century ===
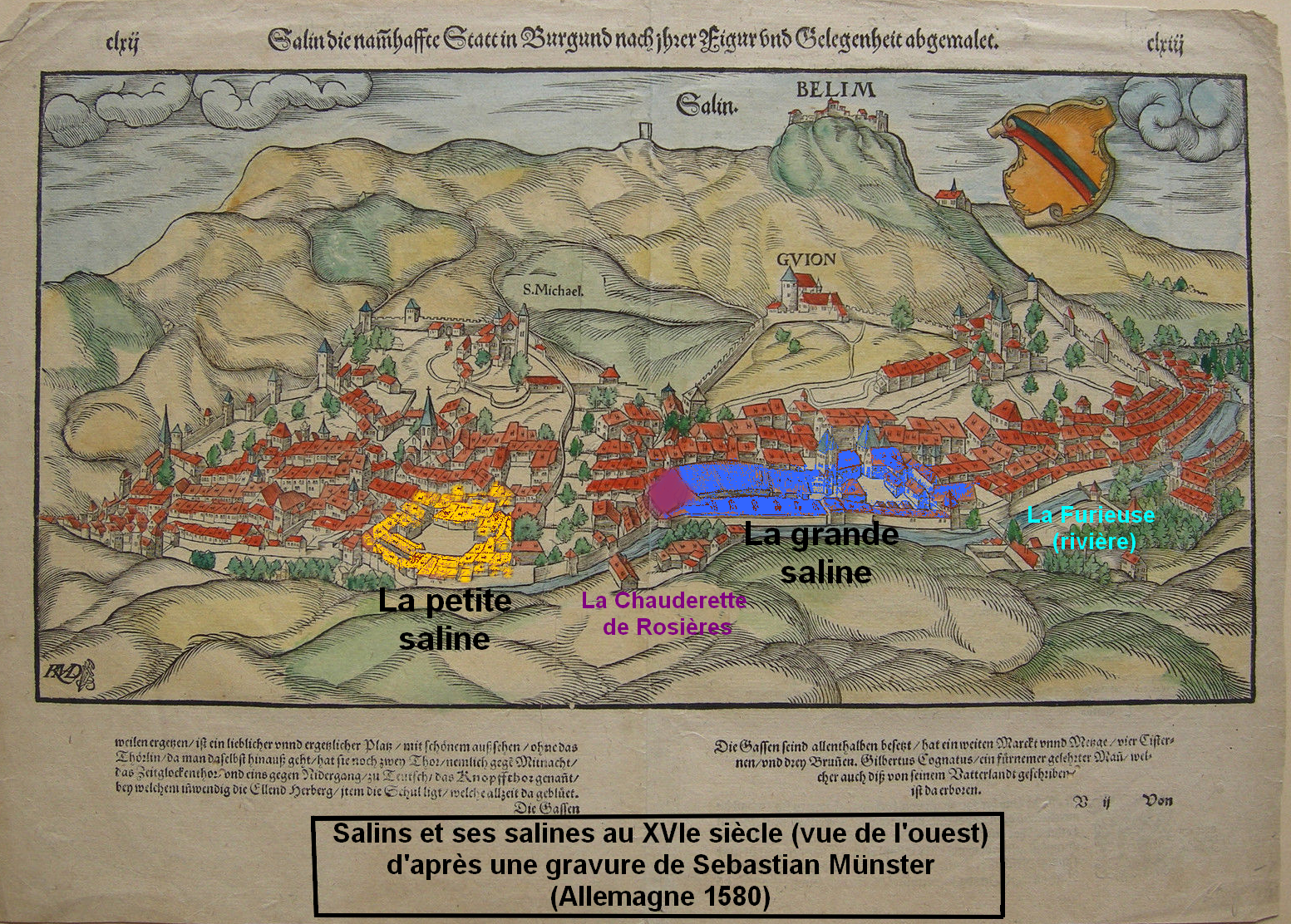
Salins and its saltworks in the 16th century.

The lords of Salins owned the Great Saunerie and controlled the Chauderette de Rosières, but the Petite Saunerie was divided into 419 shares, each granting 30 buckets of brine. These shares were gradually repurchased by Charles the Bold in the 15th century, with consolidation completed in 1571 under the Spanish County’s governor, the Duke of Alba, following the 1568 confiscation of William of Orange’s assets. The Habsburgs and Spanish kings, as Counts of Burgundy, held these rights until 1678, when Louis XIV annexed Franche-Comté.

By the late 16th century, a royal monopoly on salt production and sales generated significant wealth. In 1590, the Burgundy County’s accounts recorded a profit of 114000 livres from the saltworks, representing 60% of domainal revenues. Royal ministers appointed a "Pardessus" to manage the Salins saltworks, often delegating to a local lieutenant, though mismanagement was common. In 1601, the saltworks were leased to a fermier under a royal judge’s oversight. Following French annexation, Louis XIV inherited the unified saltworks and associated forests, formalized in a 1614 agreement.

=== Salins Saltworks in the 17th and 18th centuries ===
Salt production peaked in Salins in the 15th century at about 7,000 tonnes (6,900 long tons; 7,700 short tons) annually (20 tonnes (20 long tons; 22 short tons) daily in 1467), declining to 2,000 tonnes (2,000 long tons; 2,200 short tons) annually by the early 17th century, with 2,047 tonnes (2,015 long tons; 2,256 short tons) in 1632 (about 5.6 tonnes (5.5 long tons; 6.2 short tons) daily) before the Ten Years’ War (Franche-Comté).

By the mid-18th century, Salins faced challenges: brine salinity dropped by 10% over a century, and wood supplies for boilers, strained by lower salinity and competing forge demands, required increasingly distant and costly sourcing. The saltworks’ location in the Furieuse valley limited expansion, such as adding natural evaporation basins (graduation), which improved productivity at sites like Montmorot. Hydraulic pumps powered by the Furieuse improved extraction but were hampered by the river’s irregular flow, failing to address rising energy costs.

This led to the construction of a new saltworks near the 20,000 hectares (49,000 acres) royal Chaux Forest near Dole and the Loue river, supplied by a brine pipeline from Salins.

=== Salins Saltworks in the 18th and 19th centuries ===
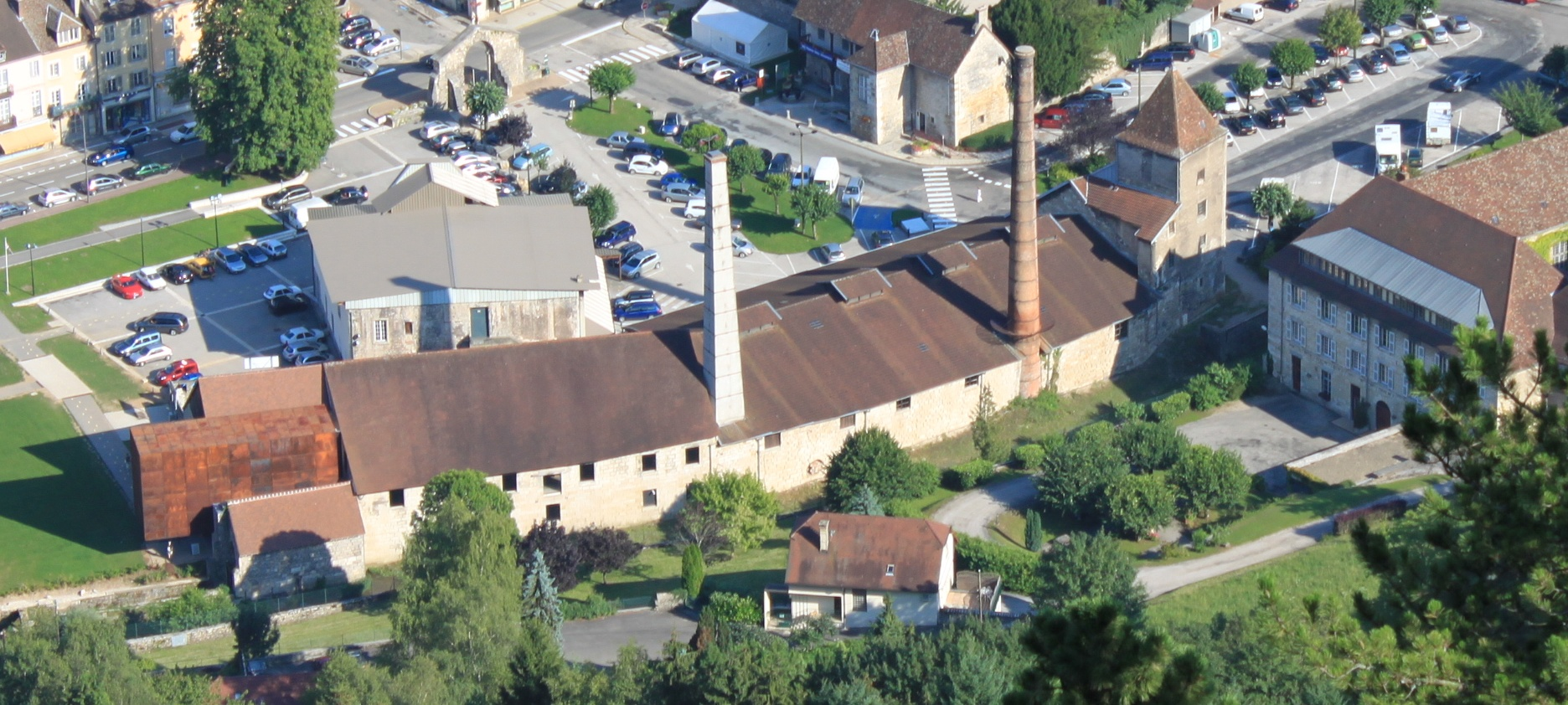
The disused Salins saltworks, photographed in 2010.

Production at Salins declined as Arc-et-Senans processed much of its brine (135,000 litres (30,000 imp gal; 36,000 US gal) daily). By the early 19th century, coal from Épinac, transported via the Rhône-Rhine Canal, began replacing wood. Salins produced 1,500–1,800 tonnes (1,500–1,800 long tons; 1,700–2,000 short tons) in 1844, compared to 4,000 tonnes (3,900 long tons; 4,400 short tons) at Arc-et-Senans and slightly more at Montmorot. Deep drilling in 1835 reached high-salinity brine (330 grams per litre (53 oz/imp gal) versus 80 grams per litre (13 oz/imp gal) previously).

In 1840, the French state ended the royal salt monopoly, and in 1843, the Eastern State Saltworks (Salins, Arc-et-Senans, Grozon, Montmorot) were sold to Jean-Marie de Grimaldi’s group, backed by Spain’s Queen Isabella II. Deep drilling intensified, and thermalism investments grew. In July 1854, the Petite Saunerie was demolished to build a thriving thermal spa, operational until at least 1914. The Great Saunerie supplied Arc-et-Senans until 1889 and continued until 1962, producing 1,000 tonnes (980 long tons; 1,100 short tons) in 1958, mainly for Salins-les-Bains’ thermal baths. By the 21st century, municipalized facilities produced only road salt. A new well, Puits des Cordeliers, was drilled in 1994 for the thermal center, and a salt museum was established following UNESCO designation in 2009.

== Royal Saltworks at Arc-et-Senans ==
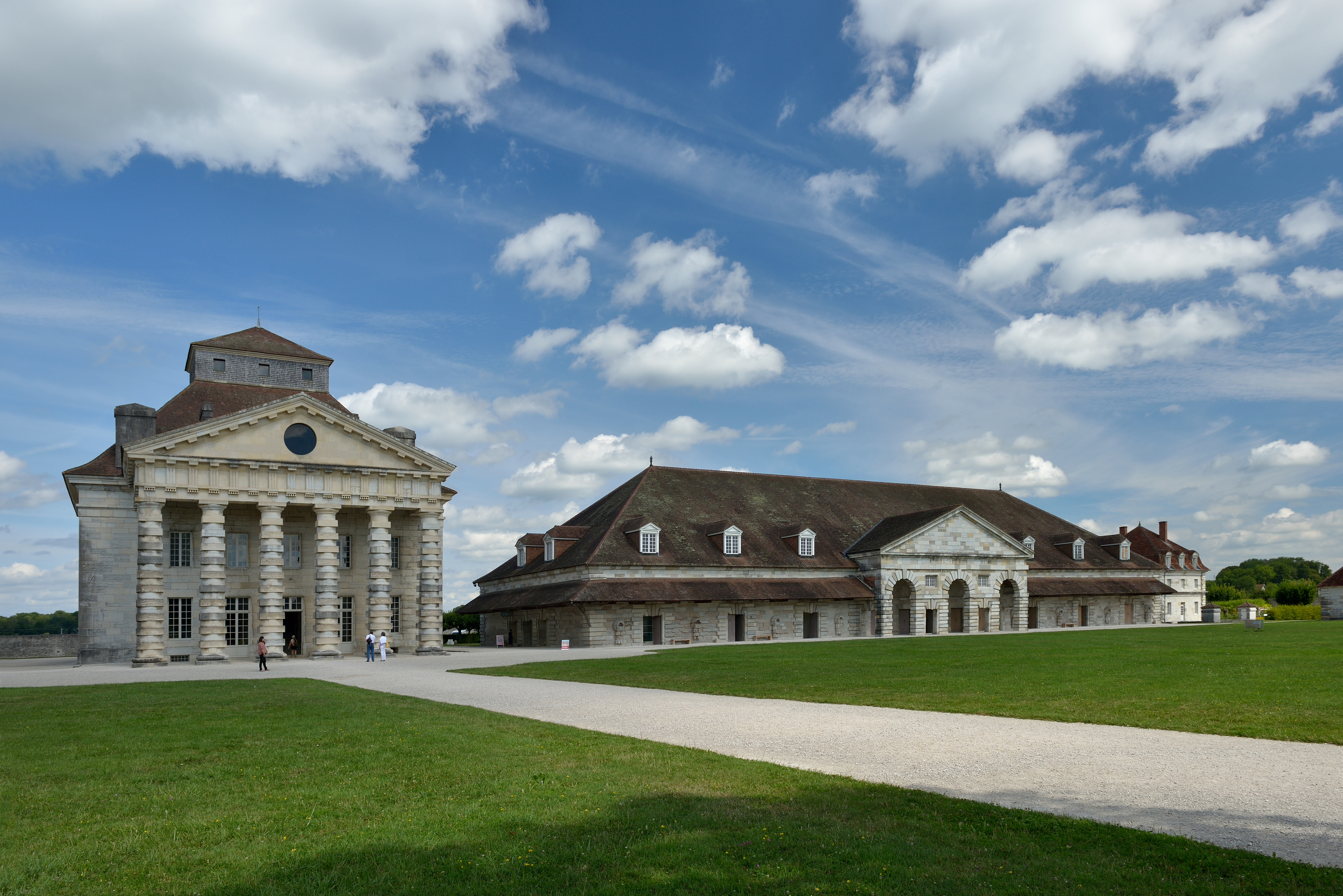
Royal Saltworks at Arc-et-Senans, with the director’s house at the center.

In 1774, royal authorities approved a new saltworks near the 20,000 hectares (49,000 acres) Chaux Forest by Dole and the Loue river, connected to Salins by a 21.25 kilometres (13.20 mi) brine pipeline. Known as the Royal Saltworks of Chaux, located in Arc-et-Senans, Doubs, it was designed by Claude-Nicolas Ledoux and built from 1775 to 1779. The wooden pipeline, later replaced with cast iron from 1782, lost 30% of brine due to leaks and smuggling, necessitating six control stations.

The grand buildings achieved only 80% of their target (3,000–4,000 tonnes (3,000–3,900 long tons; 3,300–4,400 short tons) instead of 6,000 tonnes (5,900 long tons; 6,600 short tons)), dropping to 1,600 tonnes (1,600 long tons; 1,800 short tons) by 1793. Proposals to convert the site to a textile factory emerged within 20 years. Improved brine salinity from Salins’ deep drilling sustained 19th-century operations despite cheaper sea salt and modern transport. After the 1840 monopoly abolition, Grimaldi’s group acquired the saltworks, boosting production from 1,750 tonnes (1,720 long tons; 1,930 short tons) in the late 18th century to 3,750 tonnes (3,690 long tons; 4,130 short tons) by the mid-19th century, before declining to 1,200 tonnes (1,200 long tons; 1,300 short tons) in 1894. Production ceased in 1895, and the site deteriorated until its 1926 designation as a monument historique and purchase by the Doubs department in 1927. Restored and designated a UNESCO site in 1982, it now hosts exhibitions and conferences.

== Montmorot Saltworks ==
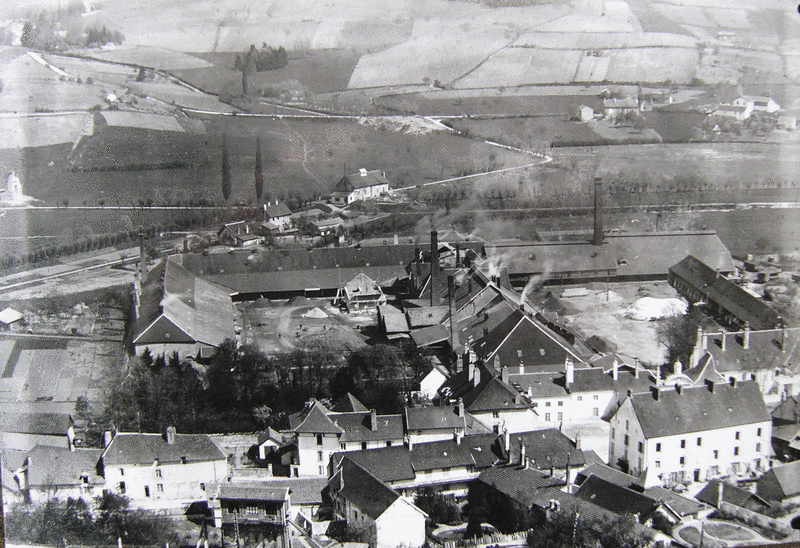
Montmorot Saltworks in the 20th century.

Salt springs at Lons-le-Saunier were known in antiquity but abandoned in the 14th century as the Chalon family prioritized Salins. To address Salins’ declining output and meet Swiss supply obligations, extraction resumed in Montmorot in 1744. The saltworks, operational by 1752, used traditional brine evaporation with added brine graduation basins for natural evaporation. Acquired by Grimaldi’s Société anonyme des anciennes Salins domaniales de l’Est in 1843, it produced over 4,000 tonnes (3,900 long tons; 4,400 short tons) in 1848 and operated until 1966, alongside the growth of thermalism in Lons-le-Saunier from 1892 via the Puits Salé spring.

Stones from a destroyed medieval fortress were donated by Louis XV in 1733 for the saltworks’ construction, authorized by a 1743 Council of State decree and built between 1744 and 1752 by engineer Jean Querret du Bois. Expanded in 1843, 1925, and 1930–1940, the buildings were partially demolished or repurposed from 1970.

== Grozon Saltworks ==
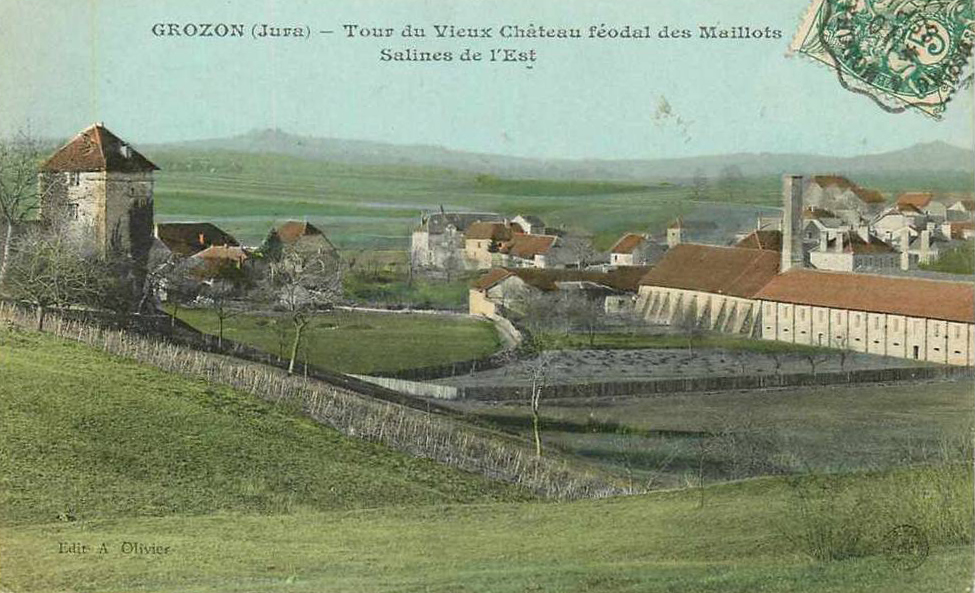
Grozon Saltworks in the early 20th century.

Known in Roman times but minimally exploited, the Grozon/Tourmont salt springs near Poligny were active in the Merovingian period, with a saltworks documented in 722 and confirmed by 2014 archaeological finds. Monastic-controlled operations ceased in 1369 as Salins monopolized production.

19th-century chemical industry demands revived interest in Jura brines. A mining concession granted in 1845 led to a saltworks built in 1853–1854, utilizing an on-site coal mine for boiler fuel until 1860. Grimaldi’s company acquired the saltworks in 1875, merging them with Montmorot and Montaigu concessions in 1888. Production reached 1,200 tonnes (1,200 long tons; 1,300 short tons) in 1864, 3,000 tonnes (3,000 long tons; 3,300 short tons) in 1875, and 960 tonnes (940 long tons; 1,060 short tons) in 1884, closing in 1885. Operations resumed in 1918, producing 2,855 tonnes (2,810 long tons; 3,147 short tons) in 1919.

== Montaigu Saltworks ==
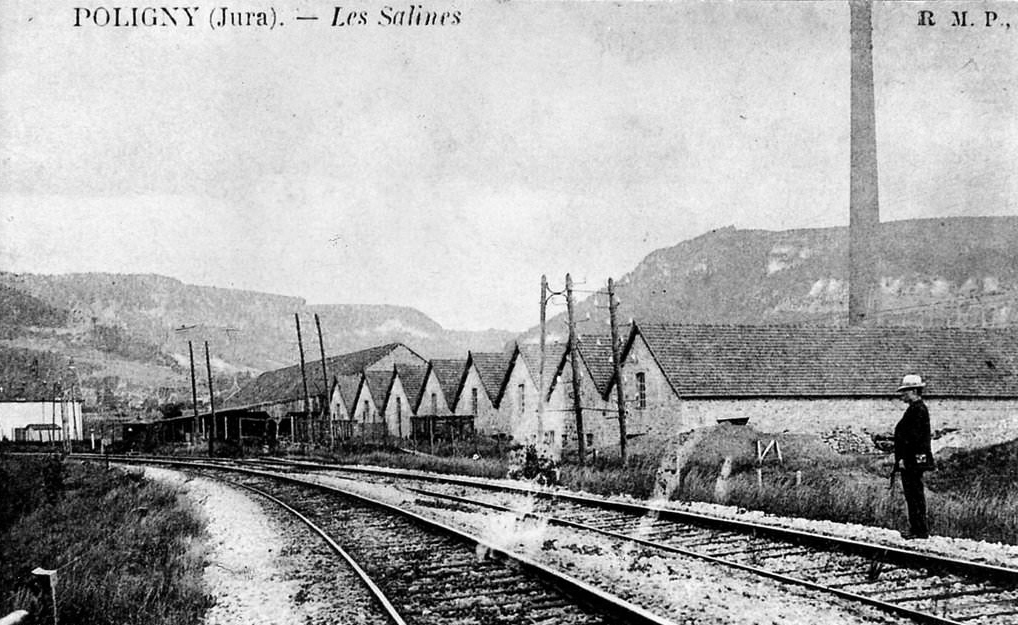
Montaigu Saltworks in the early 20th century.

A 1892 concession for rock salt exploration in Montaigu near Lons-le-Saunier led to drilling in Perrigny and construction of a saltworks in 1891–1892, later merged with Lons-le-Saunier’s territory by 1963. Production grew from 1,000 tonnes (980 long tons; 1,100 short tons) in 1893 to 2,500 tonnes (2,500 long tons; 2,800 short tons) in 1895, 4,442 tonnes (4,372 long tons; 4,896 short tons) in 1904, and 2,744 tonnes (2,701 long tons; 3,025 short tons) in 1919, peaking at 7,000 tonnes (6,900 long tons; 7,700 short tons) in 1959 before closing.

== Poligny Saltworks ==
A 1894 mining concession led to the 1895–1896 construction of the Poligny saltworks. Production began in May 1896, reaching 4,500 tonnes (4,400 long tons; 5,000 short tons) in 1898, 4,100 tonnes (4,000 long tons; 4,500 short tons) in 1901, and 4,051 tonnes (3,987 long tons; 4,465 short tons) in 1919. From 1928 to 1931, salt production ceased, and brine from expanded drilling was piped to the Solvay factory in Tavaux starting in 1932, supplemented and later replaced by brine from Ain (Etrez and Marboz) by 2007.

The salt spring at Les Nans near Champagnole was used domestically in the 19th century.

== Salt trade and smuggling under the Ancien Régime ==
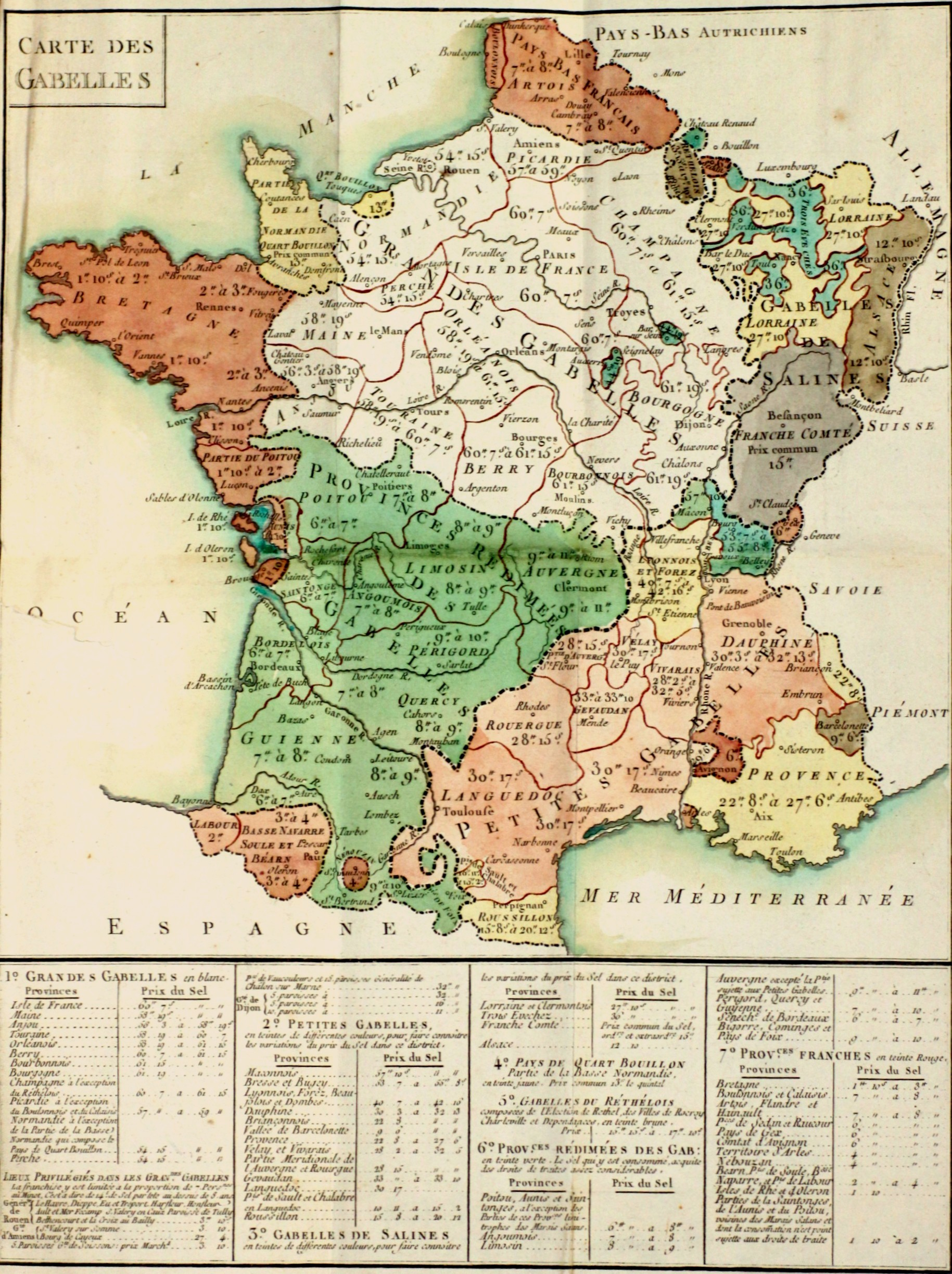
Salt tax regimes in 1781.

By the late 18th century, Jura salt production was about 70,000 tonnes (69,000 long tons; 77,000 short tons) annually, with Franche-Comté consuming 25,000 tonnes (25,000 long tons; 28,000 short tons), leaving surplus for export to Swiss cantons, Germany, and neighboring provinces. However, profitability was questioned, with some advocating for production limited to local needs and treaty obligations.

In Franche-Comté, salt trade followed Spanish provincial rules. "Ordinary salt" was lightly taxed as table salt, formed into 3.5-pound blocks in the Bailliage d’Amont, 2.5-pound blocks in the Bailliage d’Aval, or "door salt" in Salins, with "franc-salé" exemptions for officials. "Rosière salt" faced a heavier tax. These distinctions faded with 18th-century administrative reforms. Jura salt was six times cheaper than in neighboring gabelle regions, fueling smuggling.

Before 1678, Franche-Comté, not fully French, avoided the gabelle established in 1343 by Philip VI of France. In 1680, Colbert created five tax-collecting Farms, including the gabelle, dividing France into six tax regions. Franche-Comté, a "saltworks region," had no direct salt tax but a state monopoly on "true salt." "False salt" was illegal, with smugglers facing severe penalties. A royal edict of 27 August 1703 regulated salt sales, supplemented by an August 1705 edict against smuggling.

Price disparities drove smuggling with Lorraine, Swiss cantons, Burgundy, and especially Bresse, where salt cost 60 livres per quintal versus 15 livres in Jura. Between October 1745 and June 1746, 42 salt seizures occurred in Bresse. Smugglers used methods like scraping salt blocks for "pousset," siphoning brine, or attacking transports, risking fines, banishment, or galleys. The unpopular gabelle was abolished on 1 December 1790, standardizing salt trade and ending smuggling.

== Current situation ==
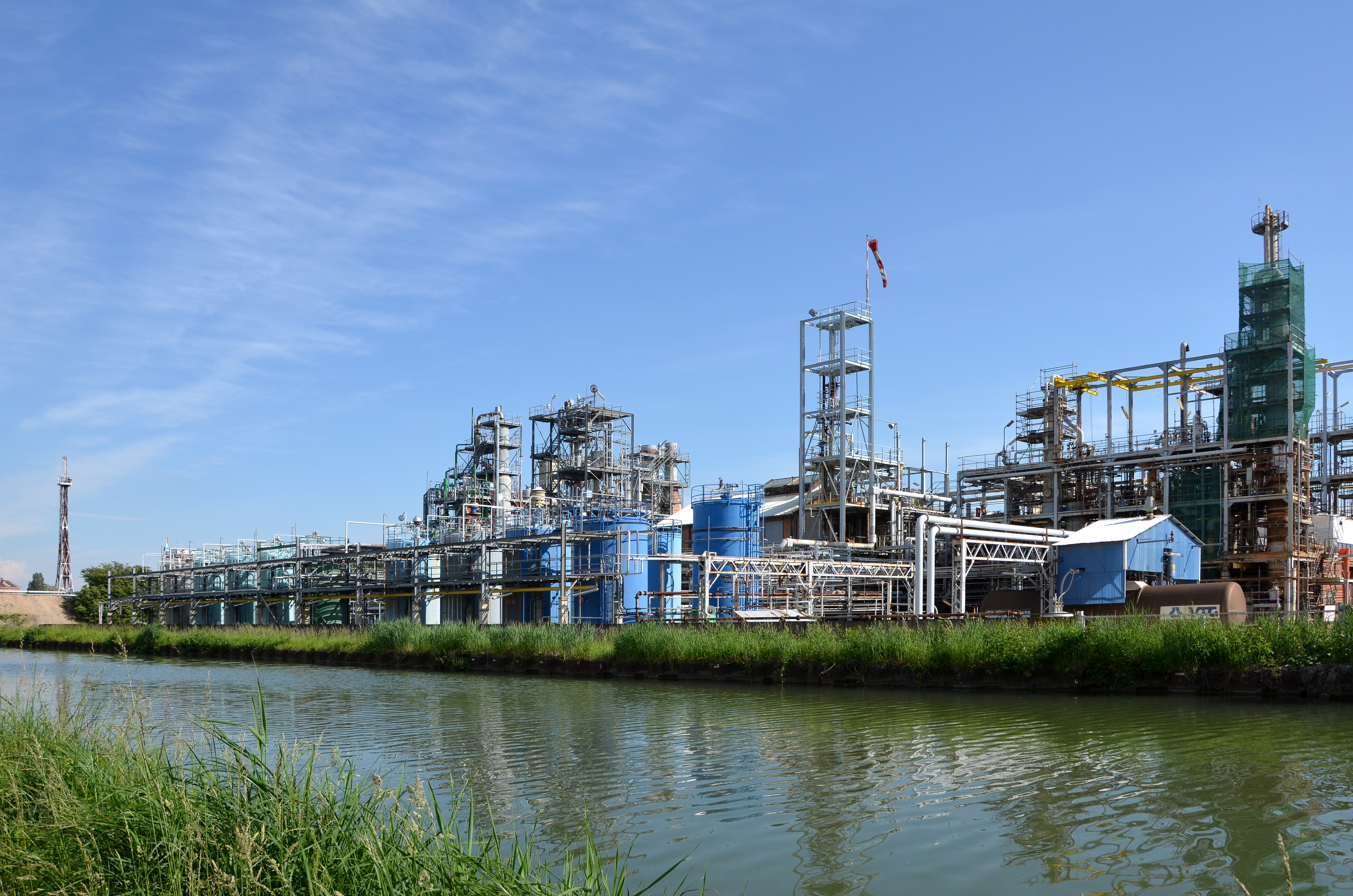
The Solvay factory in Tavaux near Dole.

In the 2000s, Jura salt extraction has largely ceased, but its legacy endures through thermalism, the Salins-les-Bains Salt Museum, the Arc-et-Senans cultural site, and events like the Terra Salina salt routes. The Solvay factory in Tavaux continues salt-based chemical production but relies on brine from Bresse and Poligny, processing 700,000 tonnes (690,000 long tons; 770,000 short tons) annually for products like sodium chloride, sodium hypochlorite, caustic soda, and others.

== See also ==
- Saltern
- Salt mining
- Geology of the Jura Massif
- Solvay S.A.
- Ernest Solvay
- Solvay process

== Bibliography ==
- Besson, André (1998). La fabuleuse histoire du sel [The Fabulous History of Salt] (in French). Ed. Cabédita. p. 140. ISBN 9782882952318.
- Bichet, Vincent; Campy, Michel (2009). Montagnes du Jura: Géologie et paysages [Mountains of the Jura: Geology and Landscapes] (in French) (2 ed.). Besançon: Néo Éditions. p. 304. ISBN 978-2-914741-61-3.
- Sommaruga, Anna (2000). Géologie du Jura central et du bassin molassique: nouveaux aspects d'une chaîne d'avant-pays plissée et décollée sur des couches d'évaporites [Geology of the Central Jura and the Molasse Basin: New Insights into an Evaporite-Based Foreland Fold and Thrust Belt] (in French). Neuchâtel: Société neuchâteloise des sciences naturelles. p. 195. ISBN 2-88347-001-4. Archived from the original on December 8, 2015.
- Dormois, R.; Ricours, J. (1943). Houille triasique sur le versant N.O. du Jura [Triassic Coal on the Northwest Slope of the Jura] (PDF) (in French). BRGM.
- Morin, Denis (2008). "La saline de Melecey-Fallon (Haute-Saône). Traditions et innovations techniques dans la fabrication du sel au XIXe siècle… Quand le bois remplace le charbon de terre" [The Melecey-Fallon Saltworks (Haute-Saône): Traditions and Technical Innovations in 19th-Century Salt Production… When Wood Replaces Coal]. In Weller, Olivier; Dufraisse, Alexa; Pétrequin, Pierre (eds.). Sel, eau, forêt. D'hier à aujourd'hui [Salt, Water, Forest: From Yesterday to Today] (in French). Besançon: Presses universitaires de Franche-Comté. pp. 479–504. doi:10.4000/books.pufc.25777. ISBN 978-2-84867-230-4.
