= Grozon coal and saltworks =

Mines in the Keuperian basin, France

Jura Mining Company
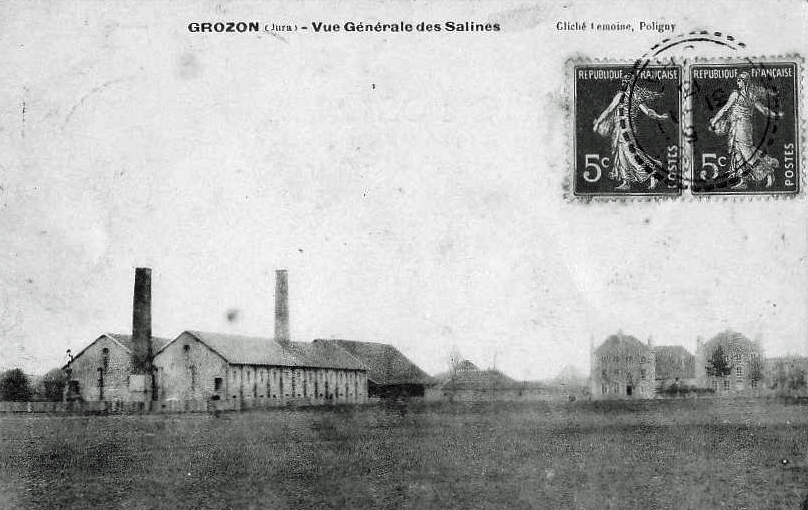
- The Grozon saltworks
- Industry: coal, rock salt
- Founded: 1840 Neolithic-1369: early mining 1845: concession granted 1852: new operation 1888: merger with Montmorot
- Defunct: 1875 (company) 1944 (coal) Mid-20th century (salt)
- Area served: Grozon, France

The Grozon collieries and saltworks are coal and rocksalt mines located in the Keuperian basin, in the Jura department of Bourgogne-Franche-Comté, in eastern France. They were mined in the communes of Grozon and Tourmont from 1845 to 1944 for the coal and from the 6th to the 20th century for the salt, after an initial period of mining in the Neolithic period and during the Ancient history. The use of coal on site to evaporate the brine enabled the Jura Mining Company (which only owned this saltworks) to reduce the cost of salt.

The 19th-century saltworks buildings were converted into a nursery school, village hall and housing at the end of the 20th century. The remains of the early medieval saltworks were uncovered during a rescue archaeology at the end of 2014, and are now considered unique in France.

== Location and geology ==
The concession covers an area of 1,100 hectares (2,700 acres) for coal mining and 292 hectares (720 acres) for salt, spread across the communes of Grozon and Tourmont, in the center of the Jura department in the Bourgogne-Franche-Comté region.

The black coal and halite deposits mined are intermingled in the Haute-Saône Keuperian coalfield. This basin consists of alternating layers of sandstone, iridescent marl and gypsum dolomite. The salt layer lies at a depth of 86 meters (282 ft), is 6.5 meters (21 ft) thick, and the material extracted by blasting yields 87% pure salt.

== Saltworks ==
=== Neolithic and antiquity ===
Traces of salt extraction dating back to the Neolithic period have been found in the commune. First extraction took place around 3900–3540 BC. As the region became more settled, salt mining intensified in the 13th century BC.

At that time, from the Neolithic to the Roman period, brine evaporation was carried out without containers or infrastructure, but on the ground on a pyre set up near the salt springs. Layers of ash and charcoal accumulated over a distance of some 10 meters (33 ft) were observed in Salins-les-Bains, Grozon and Lons-le-Saunier during archaeological research carried out between 1996 and 2001. These remains have been dated to 6,000 years ago. Grozon offers better research prospects than Salin or Lons, which are located in an urban context.

The discrete exploitation of the Neolithic period intensified during the Bronze Age, with a first peak in production around 1400–1500 BC, accompanied by population growth. The second production peak occurred at the beginning of the Iron Age. After the 4th century BC, Grozon became, along with Lons-le-Saunier, one of the two main salt production sites of the Sequani, and remained so until Gallic Wars, when Sequani salt products were particularly in demand on the markets of Rome. In order to promote Roman salt, the Empire built a monumental sanctuary over the spring and prevented any exploitation.

Grozon's ash layers were exploited in the 19th century as fertilizer for Bresse farms. The evaporation of salt consumed large quantities of wood, leading to extensive forest clearance. The increasing scarcity of certain species as the activity intensifies shows that hornbeam, beech and especially oak are used as fuel.

== Early Middle Ages ==
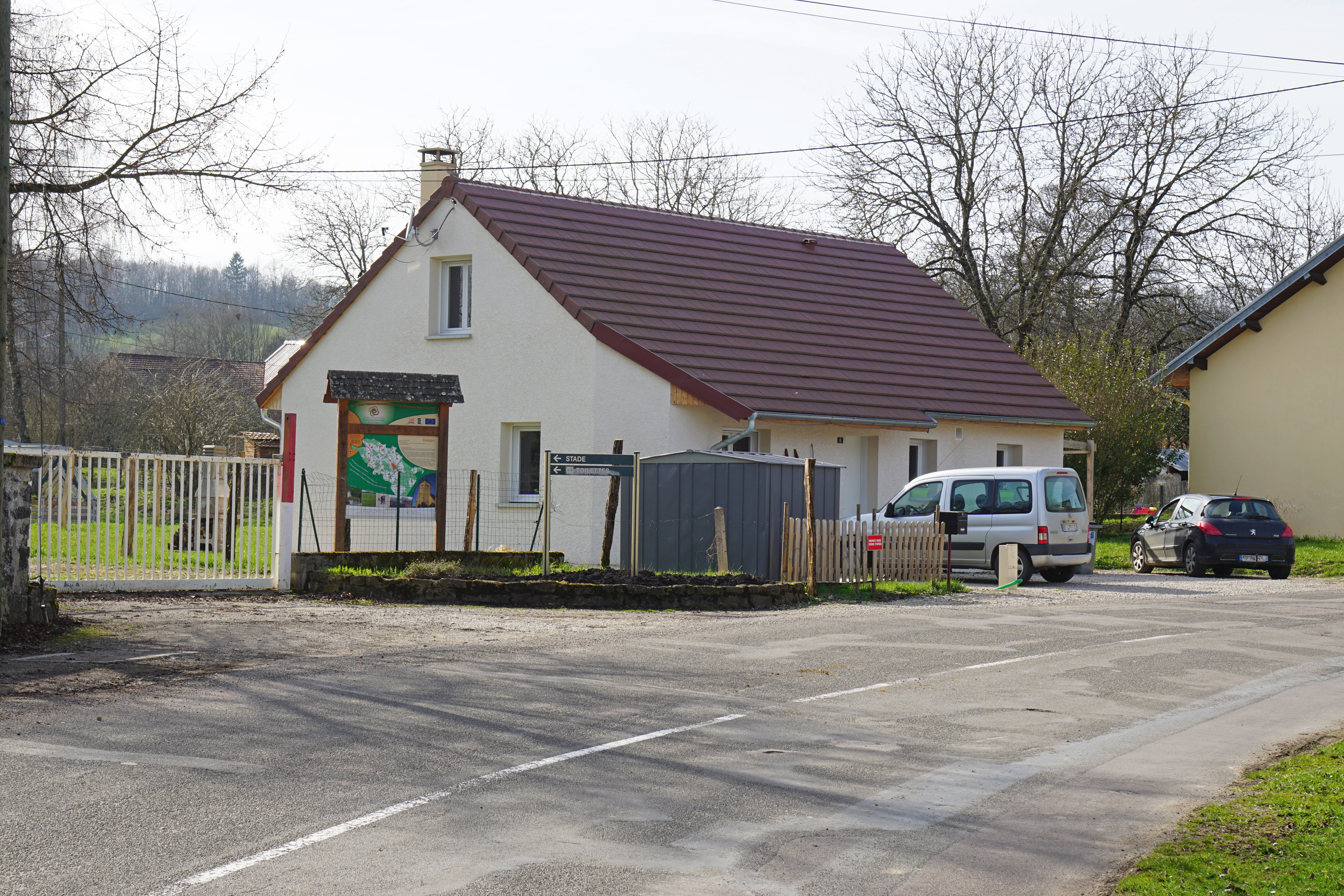
The location of the old saltworks in 2017

An ancient saltworks was in operation in Grozon in the 6th century, mentioned in a donation text dated 722. Ownership of the saltworks changed regularly between lords and local religious authorities. In 906, it was acquired by the Abbey of Flavigny, then by Hugues I, Archbishop of Besançon in 1053. Thirty years later, it became the property of Rosières Abbey. The buildings were burnt down and the spring blocked after a treaty of June 23, 1369, which obliged Margaret I Countess of Burgundy, who had inherited the property, to destroy the saltworks so that the Salins saltworks would be the only one to produce in the Archdiocese of Besançon. In 1854, ruins of the walls covered with earth, coal, ash and old tiles remained.

In September 2014, the remains of five buildings of different architectural styles were discovered over an area of 600 square meters (6,500 sq ft) during an archaeological survey carried out by the Direction Régionale des Affaires Culturelles (DRAC) and the Institut National de Recherches Archéologiques Préventives (INRAP). Foundations of wooden buildings, as well as the base of stone walls measuring 50 centimeters (20 in) thick and 1.5 meters (5 ft) high from the quadrangular evaporation building, were uncovered, along ceramics. Archaeologists believe that these remains are unique in France, and that the presence of a masonry building (usually reserved for a place of worship in this period) calls into question historical knowledge of early medieval saltworks infrastructures. The wooden elements are preserved by the presence of the phreatic zone. These remains were reburied to preserve them at the end of the excavation on November 3. A pavilion was built over them in 2015.

=== Industrial Revolution ===
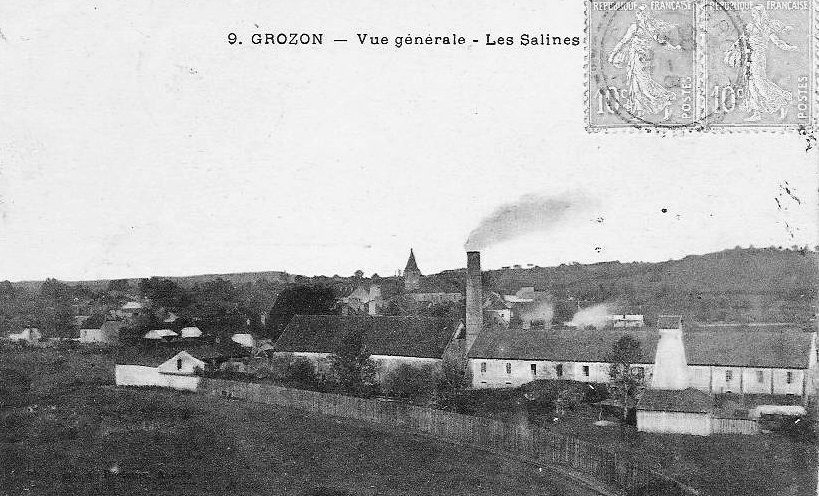
View of the evaporation plant with brine well

The Compagnie des Mines du Jura was created in 1840 with a capital of one million francs divided into 2,000 shares and was granted the Grozon concession by royal decree on April 12, 1845. Salt mining began in 1852 with extraction shafts and adit mining. However, this method was replaced by a more cost-effective system of drawing brine from three boreholes drilled directly from the eight-stove evaporation plant built by engineers Delize, Thomas and Boucard between 1853 and 1854. Commissioning of the plant was authorized on February 3, 1855, and was powered by a steam engine. The evaporation workshop collapsed in 1873 and was quickly rebuilt. In 1875, the saltworks were bought by the Société des anciennes Salines domaniales de l'Est, which led to the dissolution of the Compagnie des Mines du Jura. Two years later, the company relaunched a well dug in 1840, but which had remained unused.

Annual salt production rose from 1,200 tons in 1864 with twelve workers, to 3,000 tons in 1875, before dropping to 960 tons in 1884 and ceasing the following year. It employed five workers in 1882. In 1888, the Grozon salt concession merged with the Montmorot concession.The boreholes were reinforced between 1891 and 1896, and a fourth borehole was dug. The concession was revoked by decree in 1901, but the following year the decree was rescinded. The operation was relaunched in 1918; the following year, four new pans were installed, producing 2,855 tons of salt in the course of the year.

A saltworks store and workshop were demolished in the 1960s. At the beginning of the 21st century, the buildings housing the living quarters, offices, machine room and the extraction machine building housing the brine pumping holes remained. All these buildings were converted into a village hall, nursery school, housing and garage around 1980. On December 18, 2008, the saltworks were included in the General inventory of cultural heritage.

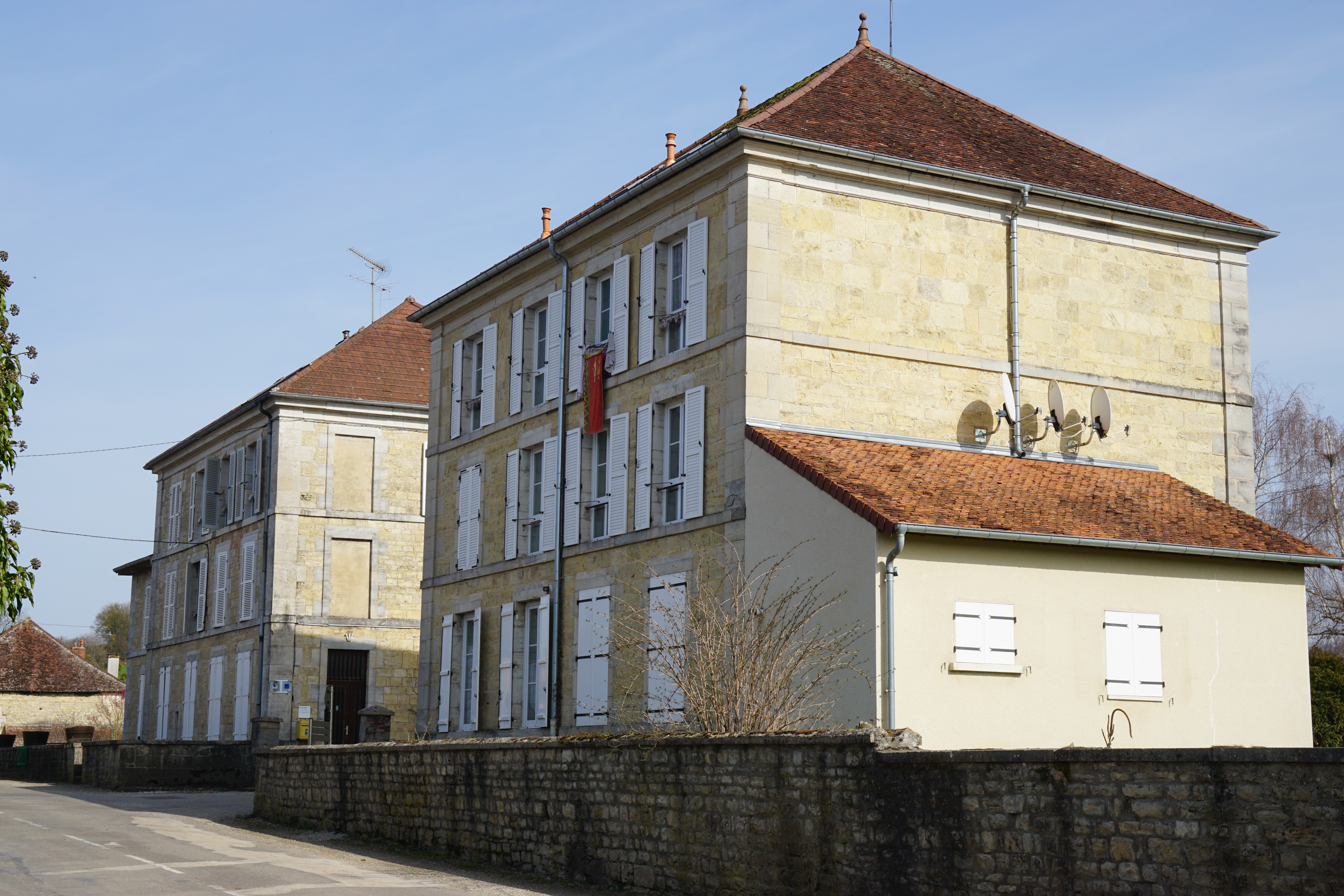
The old offices and housing

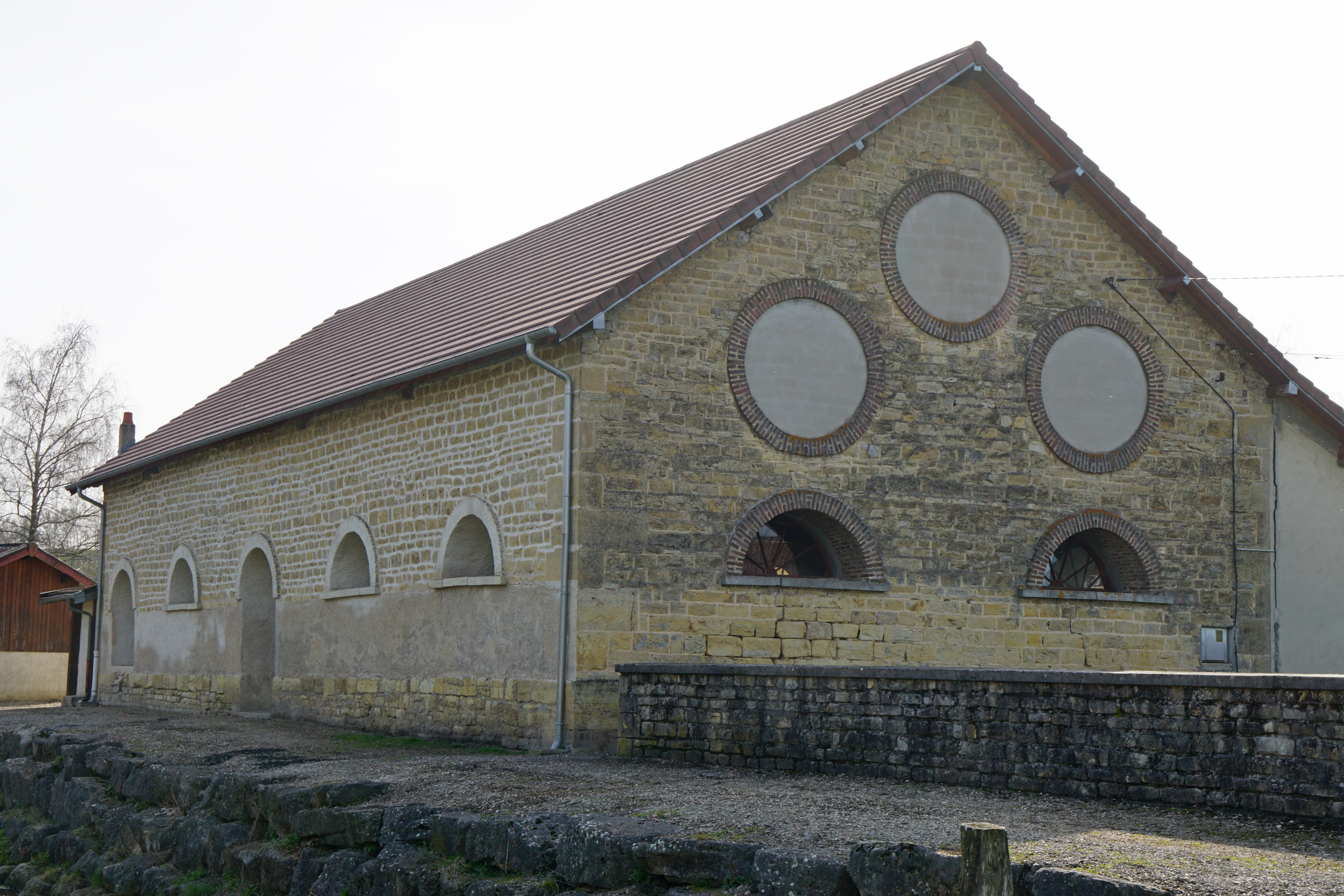
The machine room

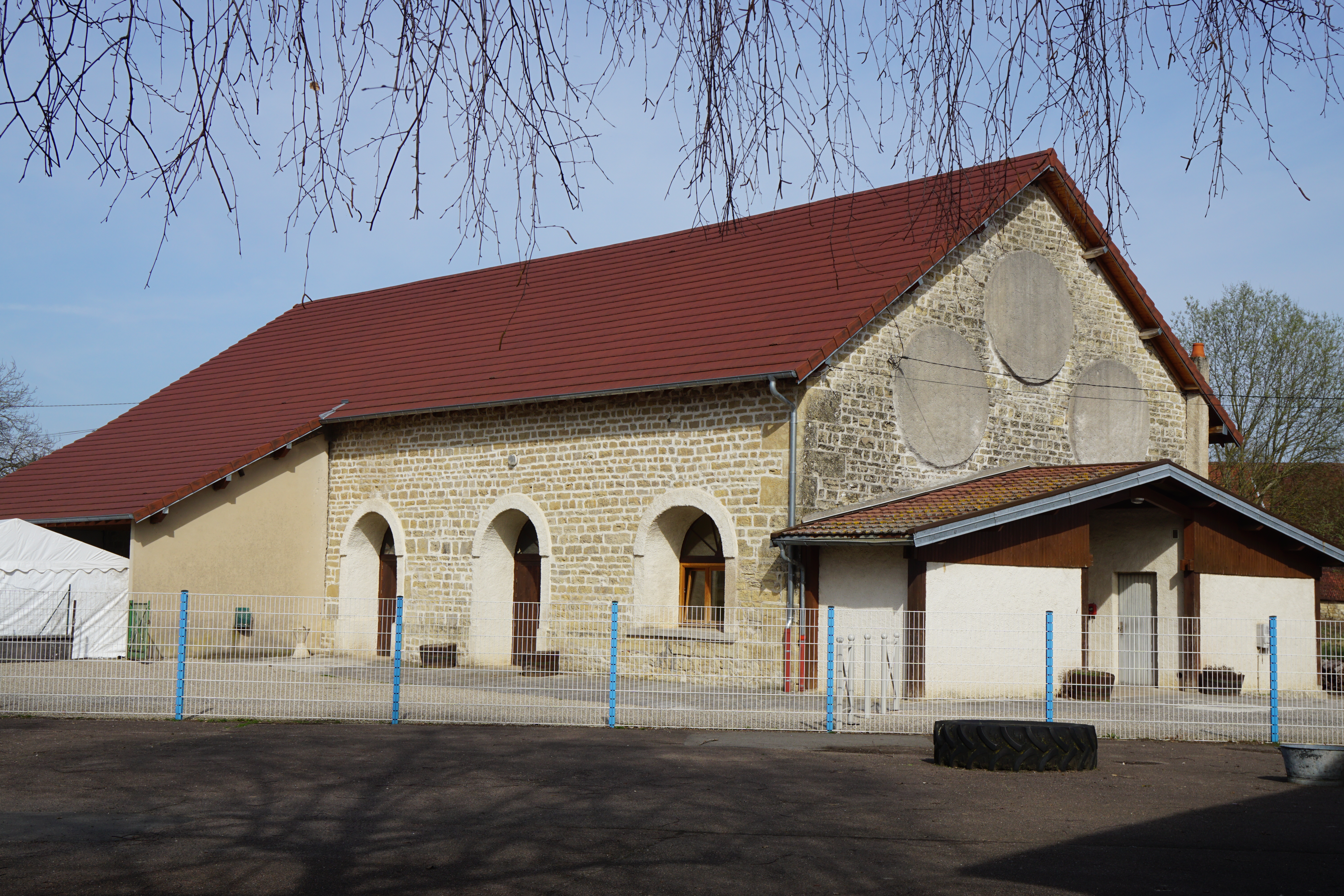
The other side

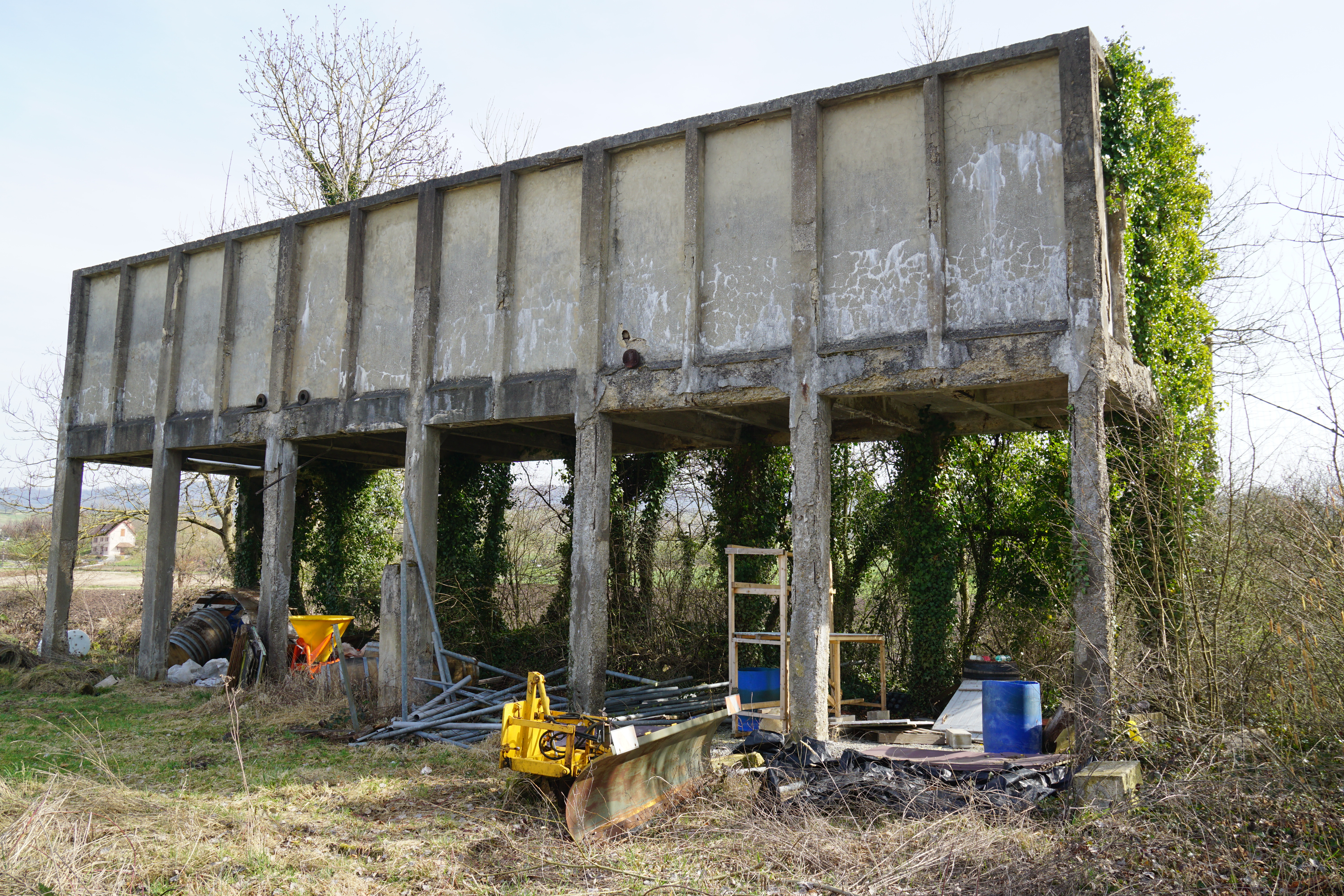
Brine tanks

== Coal mines ==
The Grozon concession, covering an area of 1,100 hectares (2,700 acres), was granted on March 8, 1845, to supply the brine evaporation stoves at the village saltworks. The mine, which closed before 1864, was the only one in the department to exploit coal.

The deposit, which is mined in a "recumbent bed", consists of a single layer varying in thickness from 40 to 80 centimeters (16 to 31 in). The coal is very dry, consisting of 73.21% carbon and 3.75% ash. It is very brittle, requiring the use of formwork in the galleries. It is of poor quality, even after washing, burns poorly due to its low calorific value and leaves a lot of ash. All these factors led to the cessation of operations.

Between 1942 and 1944, the concession was taken over by the Montmorot and Montaigu saltwork, and two chutes were dug, one to the north and the other to the south of the valley. The coal beds are disturbed by numerous faults. The carbon is blasted and sent by rail to Villeneuve and Montmorot, as well as to the Grenoble coal gas plant.

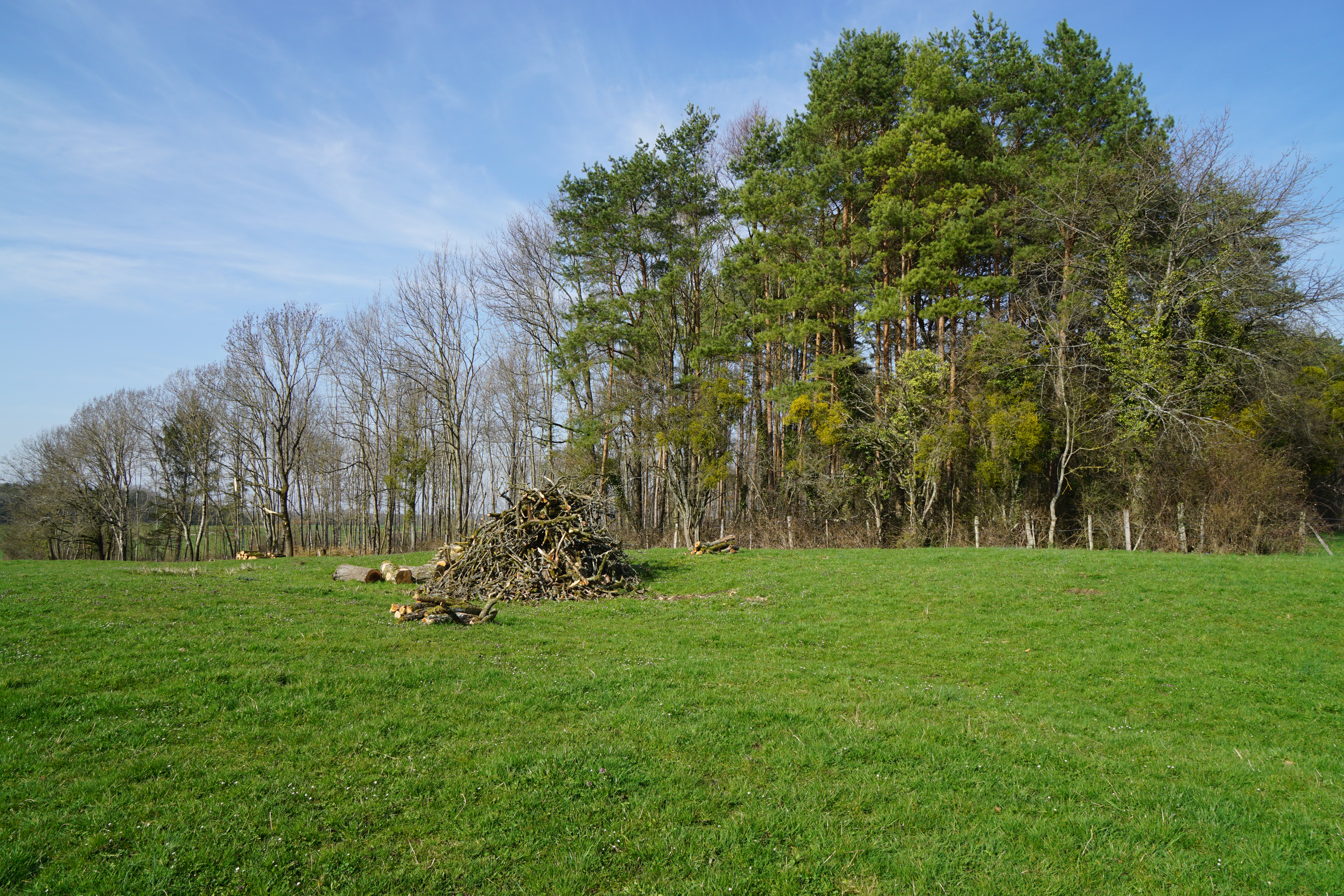
Site of the Champ sur la Pierre well in Grozon

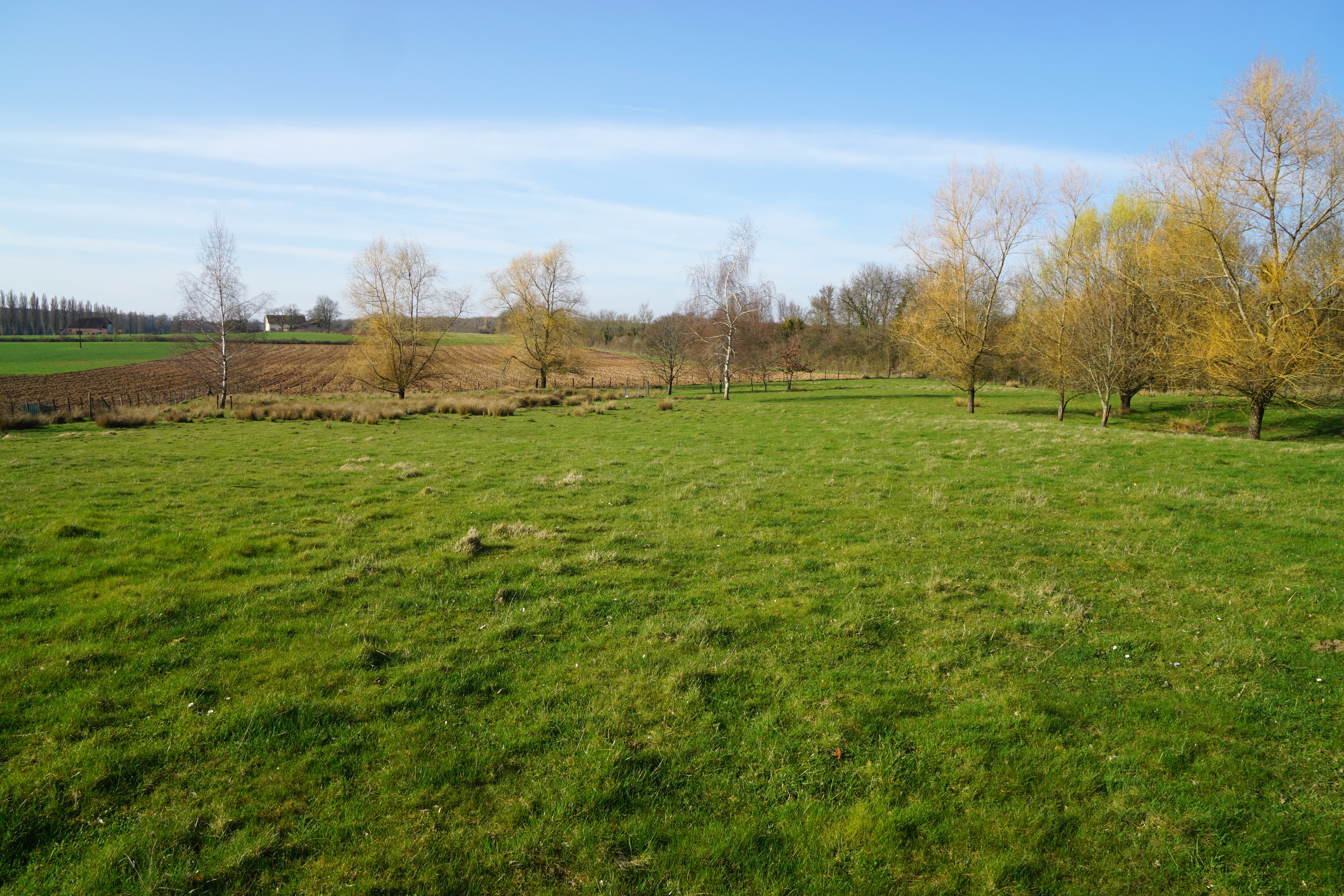
Approximate location of a Tourmont well

== See also ==
- Salt mining
