= Halite =

Mineral known as rock salt

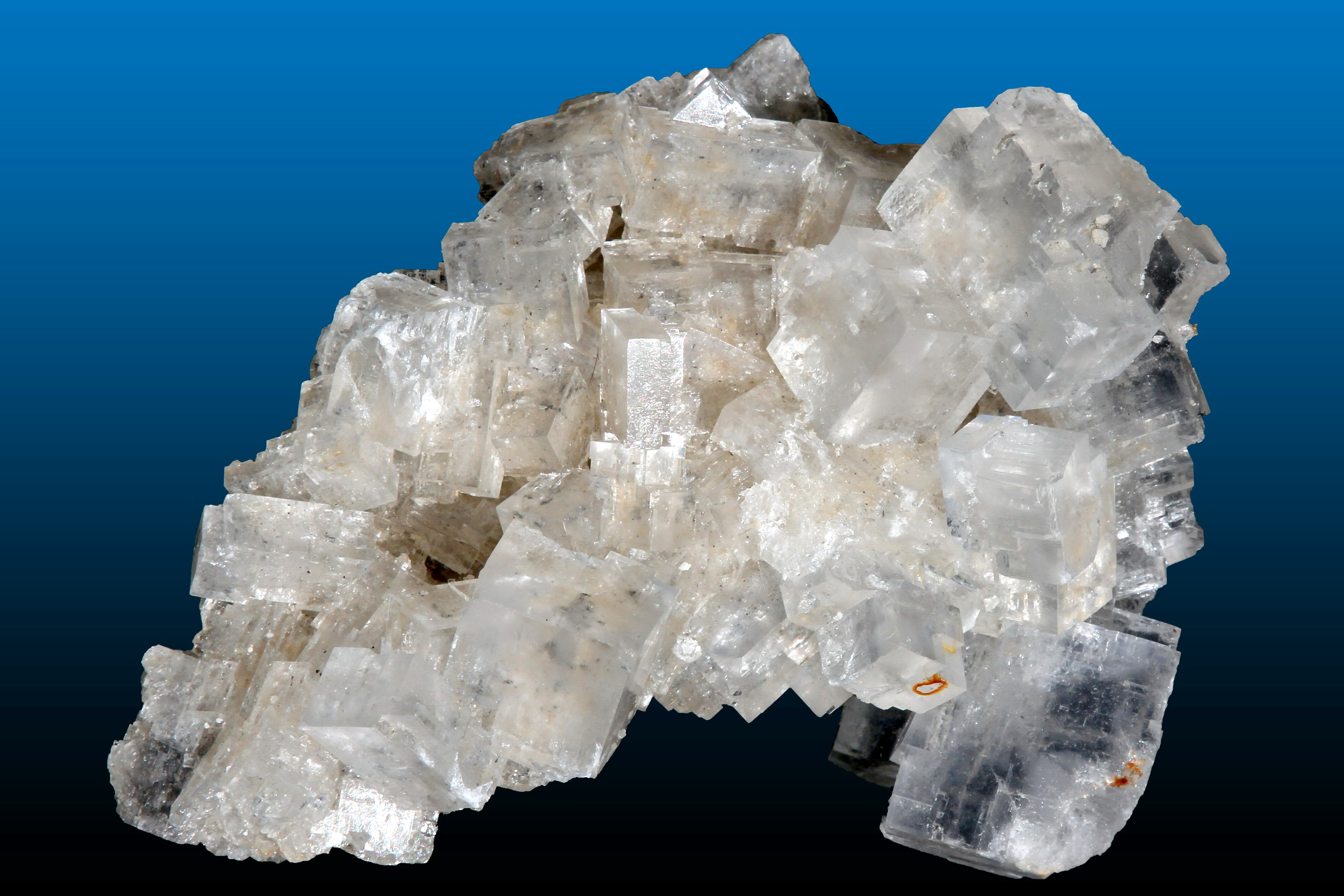
- Halite from the Wieliczka salt mine, Małopolskie, Poland

General
- Category: Halide mineral
- Formula: NaCl
- IMA symbol: Hl
- Strunz classification: 3.AA.20
- Crystal system: Cubic
- Crystal class: Hexoctahedral (m3̅m); H-M symbol: (4/m 3̅ 2/m)
- Space group: Fm3̅m
- Unit cell: a = 5.6404(1) Å; Z = 4

Identification
- Formula mass: 58.433 g/mol
- Color: Colorless or white when pure. Impurities produce any color but usually yellow, gray, black, brown, red (Depends on isotopes and purity for various colours)
- Crystal habit: Predominantly cubes and in massive sedimentary beds, but also granular, fibrous and compact
- Cleavage: Perfect {001}, three directions cubic
- Fracture: Conchoidal
- Tenacity: Brittle
- Mohs scale hardness: 2.0–2.5
- Luster: Vitreous
- Streak: White
- Diaphaneity: Transparent to Translucent
- Specific gravity: 2.17
- Optical properties: Isotropic
- Refractive index: n = 1.544
- Melting point: 800.7 °C
- Solubility: Water-soluble
- Other characteristics: Salty flavor, may be fluorescent

Halite (/ˈhælaɪt, ˈheɪlaɪt/ HAL-yte, HAY-lyte), commonly known as rock salt, is a type of salt, the mineral (natural) form of sodium chloride (NaCl). Halite forms isometric crystals. The mineral is typically colorless or white, but may also be light blue, dark blue, purple, pink, red, orange, yellow or gray depending on inclusion of other materials, impurities, and structural or isotopic abnormalities in the crystals. It commonly occurs with other evaporite deposit minerals such as several of the sulfates, halides, and borates. The name halite is derived from the Ancient Greek word for "salt", ἅλς (háls).

== Occurrence ==
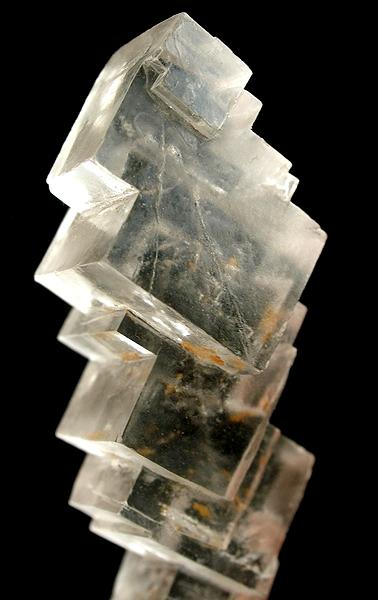
Halite cubes from the Stassfurt Potash Deposit, Saxony-Anhalt, Germany (size: 6.7 × 1.9 × 1.7 cm)

Halite dominantly occurs within sedimentary rocks where it has formed from the evaporation of seawater or salty lake water. Vast beds of sedimentary evaporite minerals, including halite, can result from the drying up of enclosed lakes and restricted seas. Such salt beds may be hundreds of meters thick and underlie broad areas. Halite occurs at the surface today in playas in regions where evaporation exceeds precipitation such as in the salt flats of Badwater Basin in Death Valley National Park.

In the United States and Canada, extensive underground beds extend from the Appalachian Basin of western New York through parts of Ontario and under much of the Michigan Basin. Other deposits are in Ohio, Kansas, New Mexico, Nova Scotia and Saskatchewan. Deposits can also be found near Dasol, Pangasinan, Philippines. The Khewra salt mine is a massive deposit of halite near Islamabad, Pakistan.

Salt domes are vertical diapirs or pipe-like masses of salt that have been essentially "squeezed up" from underlying salt beds by mobilization due to the weight of the overlying rock. Salt domes contain anhydrite, gypsum, and native sulfur, in addition to halite and sylvite. They are common along the Gulf coasts of Texas and Louisiana and are often associated with petroleum deposits. Germany, Spain, the Netherlands, Denmark, Romania and Iran also have salt domes. Salt glaciers exist in arid Iran where the salt has broken through the surface at high elevation and flows downhill. In these cases, halite is said to be behaving like a rheid.

Unusual, purple, fibrous vein-filling halite is found in France and a few other localities. Halite crystals termed hopper crystals appear to be "skeletons" of the typical cubes, with the edges present and stairstep depressions on, or rather in, each crystal face. In a rapidly crystallizing environment, the edges of the cubes simply grow faster than the centers. Halite crystals form very quickly in some rapidly evaporating lakes resulting in modern artifacts with a coating or encrustation of halite crystals. Halite flowers are rare stalactites of curling fibers of halite that are found in certain arid caves of Australia's Nullarbor Plain. Halite stalactites and encrustations are also reported in the Quincy native copper mine of Hancock, Michigan.

== Mining ==
The world's largest underground salt mine is the Sifto Salt Mine. It produces over 7 million tons of rock salt per year using the room and pillar mining method. It is located half a kilometre under Lake Huron in Ontario, Canada. In the United Kingdom there are three mines; the largest of these is at Winsford in Cheshire, producing, on average, one million tonnes of salt per year.

== Uses ==
Salt is used extensively in cooking as a flavor enhancer, and to cure a wide variety of foods such as bacon and fish. It is frequently used in food preservation methods across various cultures. Larger pieces can be ground in a salt mill or dusted over food from a shaker as finishing salt.

Halite is also often used both residentially and municipally for managing ice. Because brine (a solution of water and salt) has a lower freezing point than pure water, putting salt or saltwater on ice that is below 0 °C (32 °F) will cause it to melt—this effect is called freezing-point depression. It is common for homeowners in cold climates to spread salt on their sidewalks and driveways after a snow storm to melt the ice. It is not necessary to use so much salt that the ice is completely melted; rather, a small amount of salt will weaken the ice so that it can be easily removed by other means. Also, many cities will spread a mixture of sand and salt on roads during and after a snowstorm to improve traction. Using salt brine is more effective than spreading dry salt because moisture is necessary for the freezing-point depression to work and wet salt sticks to the roads better. Otherwise the salt can be wiped away by traffic.

In addition to de-icing, rock salt is occasionally used in agriculture. An example of this would be inducing salt stress to suppress the growth of annual meadow grass in turf production. Other examples involve exposing weeds to salt water to dehydrate and kill them preventing them from affecting other plants. Salt is also used as a household cleaning product. Its coarse nature allows for its use in various cleaning scenarios including grease/oil removal, stain removal, dries out and hardens sticky spills for an easier clean.

Some cultures, especially in Africa and Brazil, prefer a wide variety of different rock salts for different dishes. Pure salt is avoided as particular colors of salt indicates the presence of different impurities. Many recipes call for particular kinds of rock salt, and imported pure salt often has impurities added to adapt to local tastes. Historically, salt was used as a form of currency in barter systems and was exclusively controlled by authorities and their appointees. In some ancient civilizations the practice of salting the earth was done to make conquered land of an enemy infertile and inhospitable as an act of domination or spite. One biblical reference to this practice is in Judges 9:45: "he killed the people in it, pulled the wall down and sowed the site with salt."

Polyhalite, a mineral fertilizer, is not an NaCl-polymer, but hydrated sulfate of potassium, calcium and magnesium (K_{2}Ca_{2}Mg-sulfate).

Shotgun shells containing rock salt (instead of metal pellets) are a less lethal deterrent.

== Gallery ==
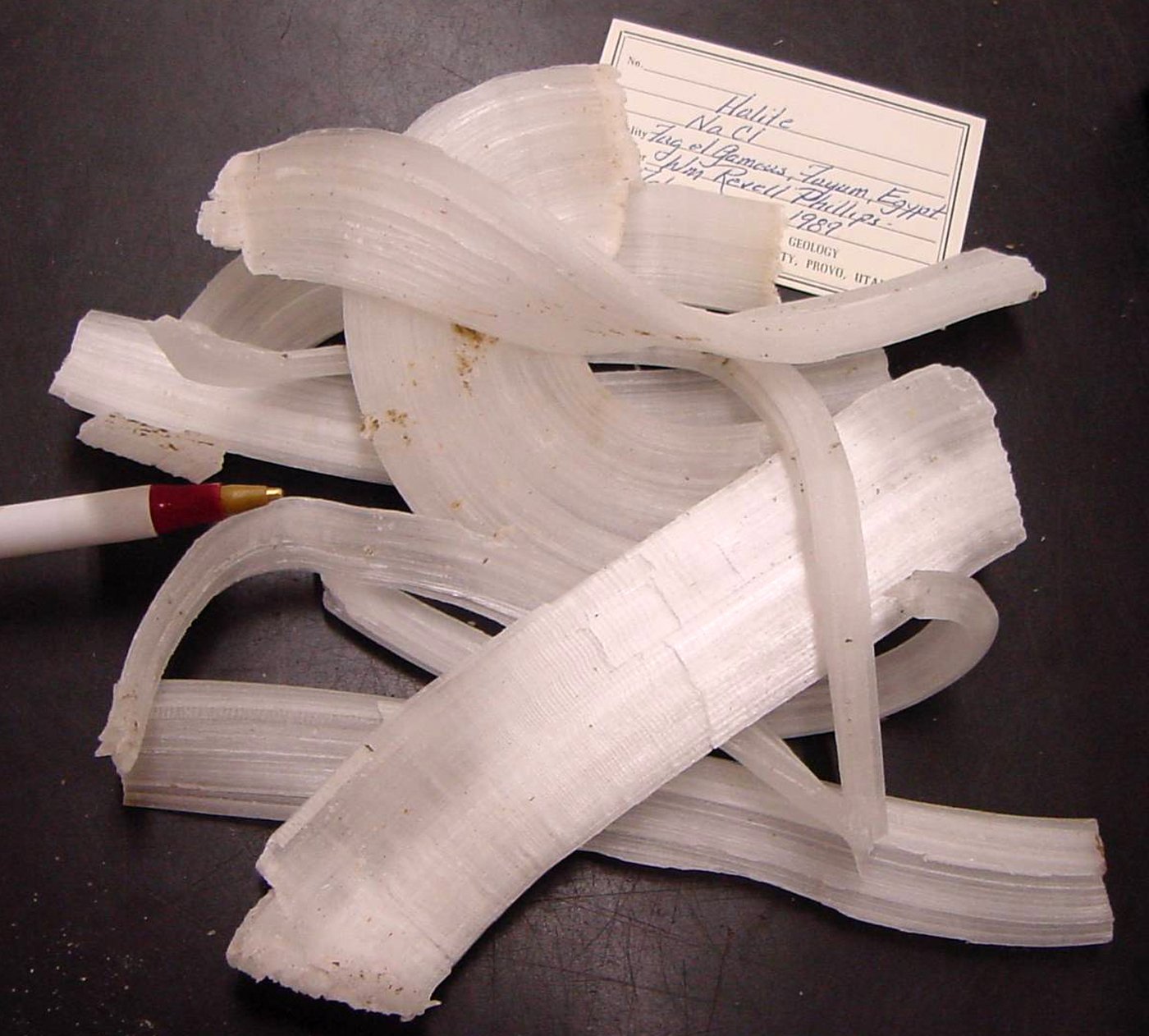
Unusual halite crystals from Faiyum, Egypt

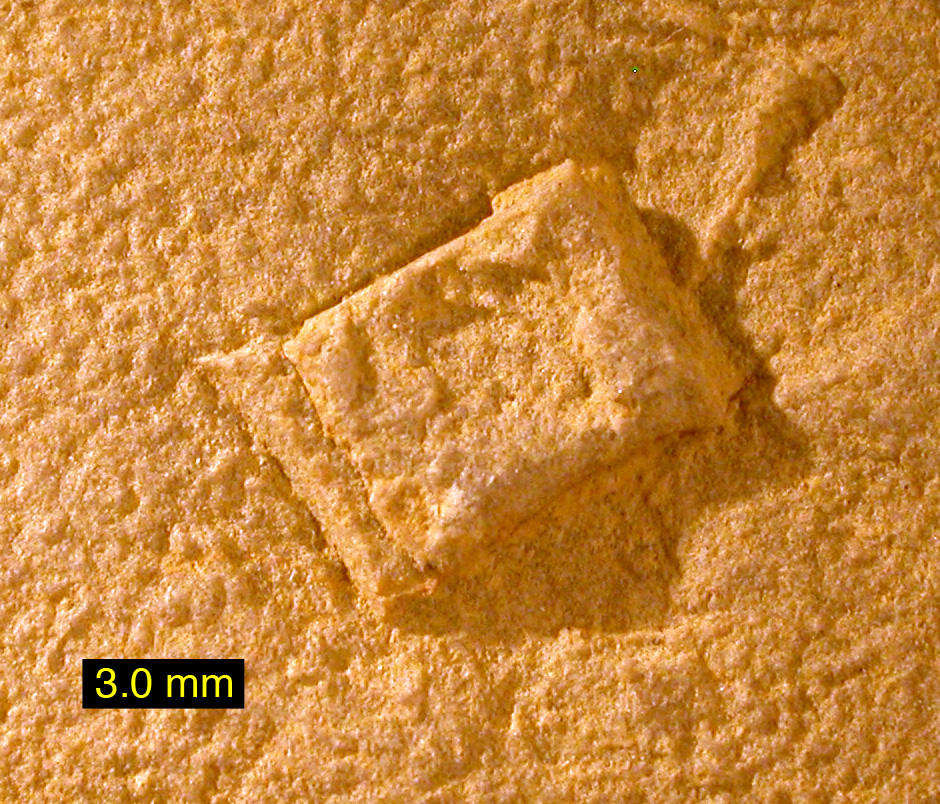
Hopper crystal cast of halite in a Jurassic rock, Carmel Formation, Utah

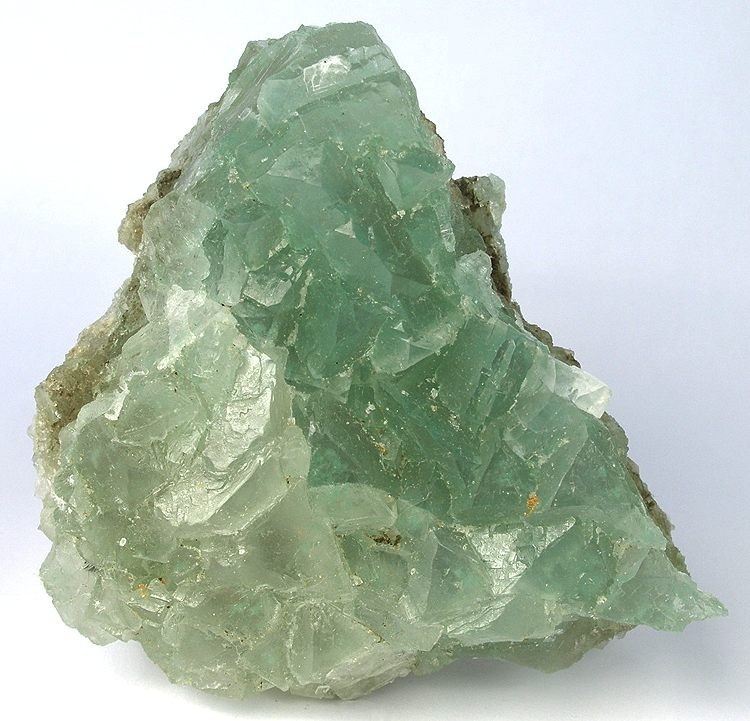
Sharp halite crystals that have this green color from inclusions of copper minerals (atacamite?)

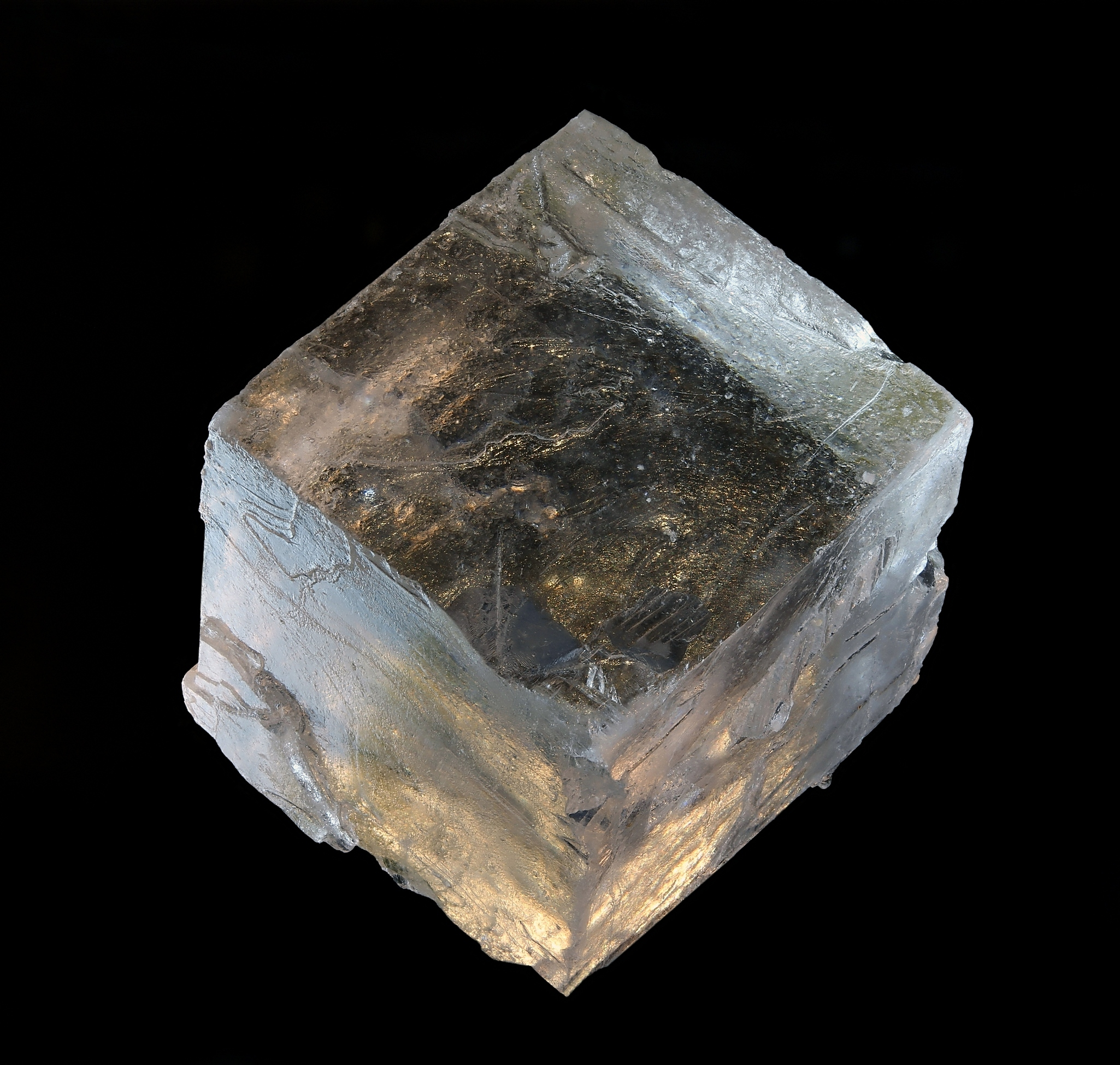
Large natural crystal of halite, showing cubic crystal form

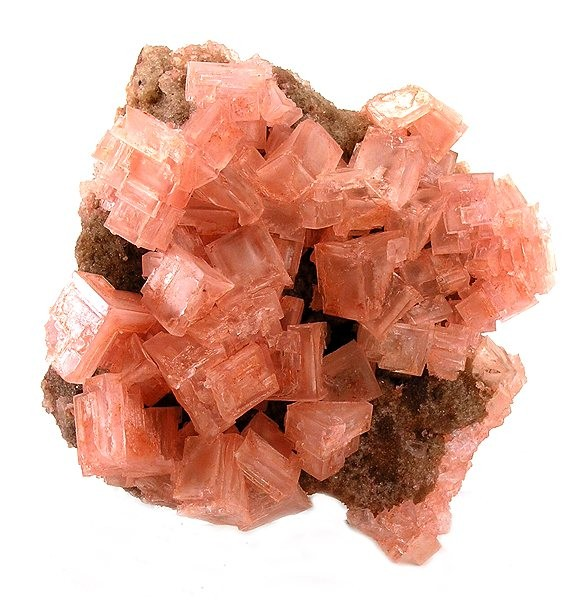
Pink color halite on a matrix covered with minute nahcolite

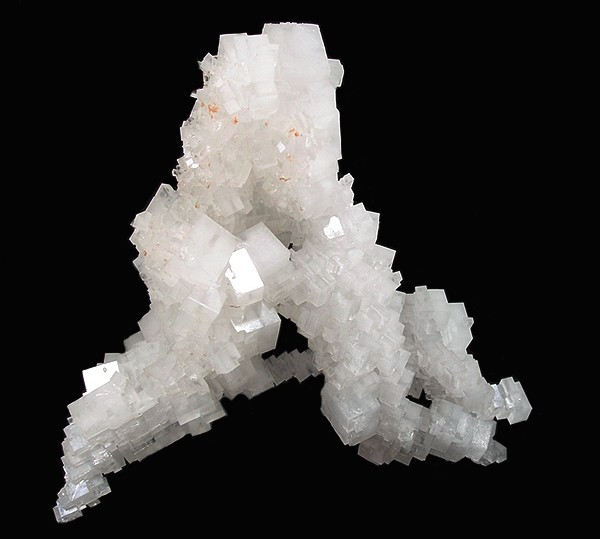
Halite from Potash Corporation of Saskatchewan Mine in Rocanville, Saskatchewan, Canada

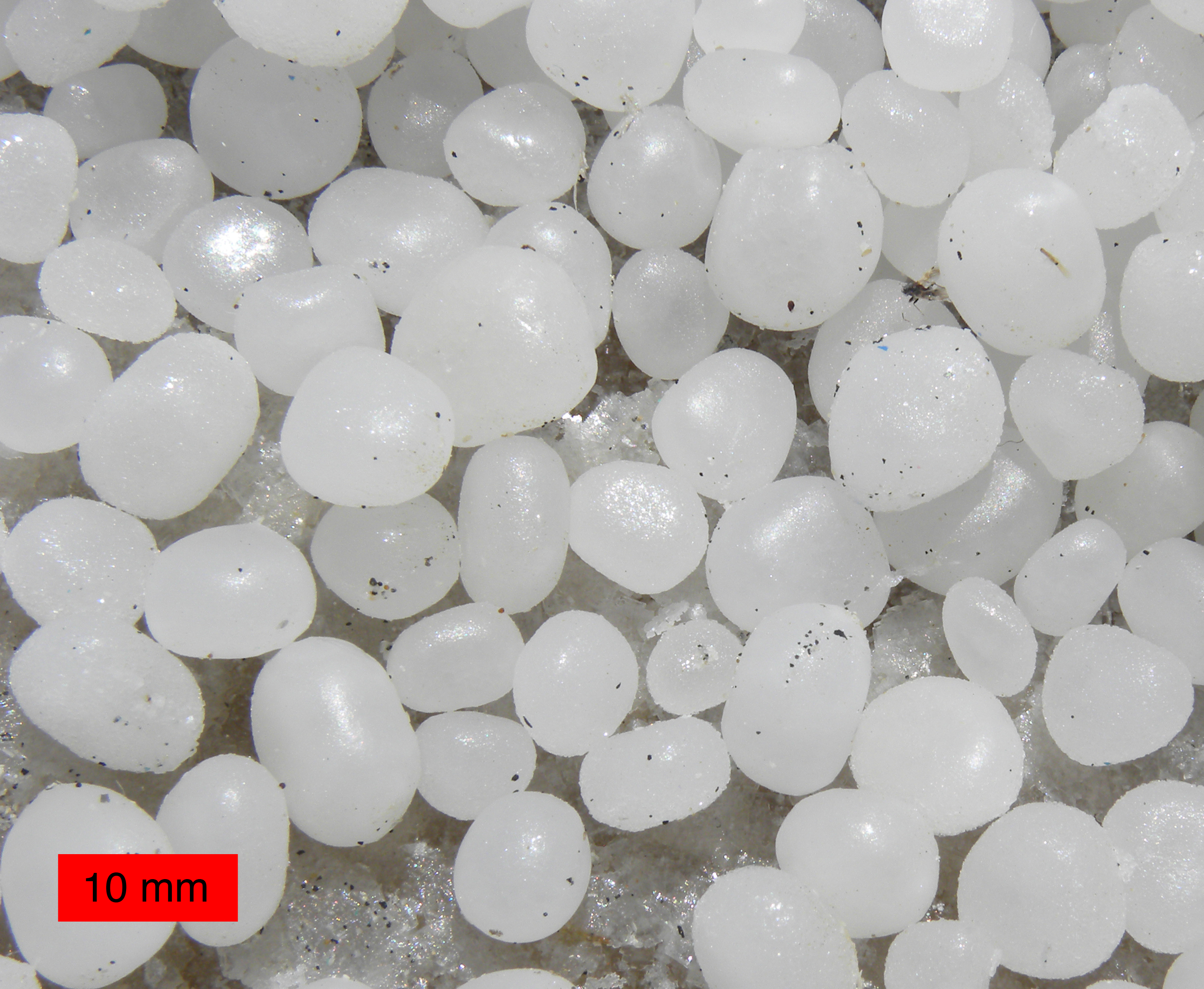
Pebbles made of halite from the western Dead Sea coast, Israel

== See also ==
- Coarse salt (edible)
- Salt tectonics
- Grozon coal and saltworks
