= Grozon =

Commune in Bourgogne-Franche-Comté, France

- Commune
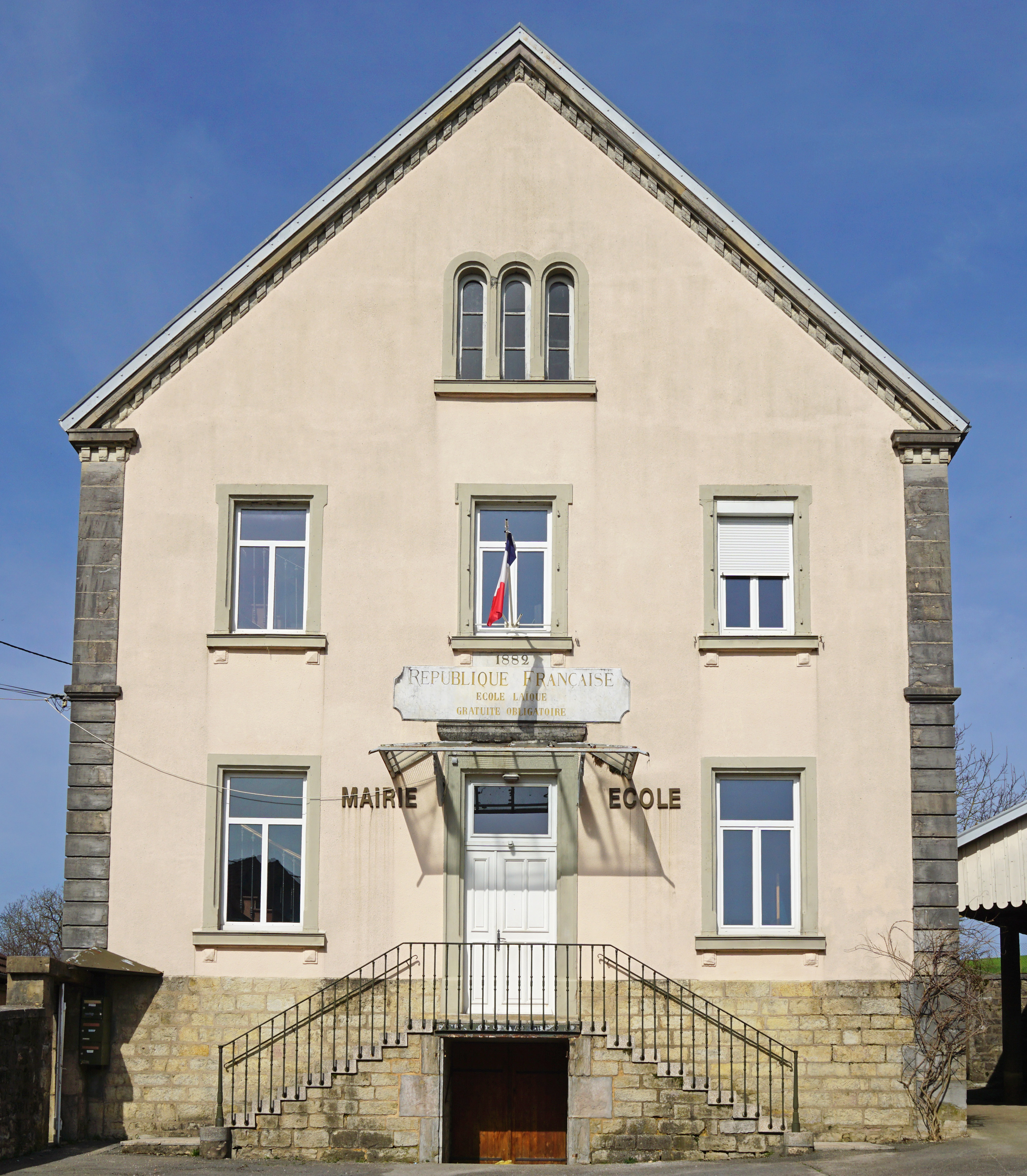
- The town hall in Grozon

- Coat of arms
- Location of Grozon
- Location within France Location within Bourgogne-Franche-Comté
- Coordinates: 46°53′25″N 5°42′05″E
- Country: France
- Region: Bourgogne-Franche-Comté
- Department: Jura
- Arrondissement: Dole
- Canton: Bletterans

Government
  - Mayor (2020–2026): Bruno Robert
- Area^{1}: 14.25 km^{2} (5.50 sq mi)
- Highest elevation: 385 m (1,263 ft)
- Lowest elevation: 239 m (784 ft)
- Population (2023): 386
  - Density: 27.1/km^{2} (70.2/sq mi)
- Time zone: UTC+01:00 (CET)
  - Summer (DST): UTC+02:00 (CEST)
- INSEE/Postal code: 39263 /39800
- ^{1} French Land Register data, which excludes lakes, ponds, glaciers > 1 km^{2} (0.386 sq mi or 247 acres) and river estuaries.

Grozon (French pronunciation: [ɡʁozɔ̃]) is a commune in the Jura department in Bourgogne-Franche-Comté in eastern France.

== History ==
A concession of coal mines was operating in the village in the second half of the 19th century and in the 1940s.

== Population ==
Historical population
Year	Pop.	±% p.a.
1968	496	—
1975	452	−1.32%
1982	423	−0.94%
1990	405	−0.54%
1999	396	−0.25%
2007	471	+2.19%
2012	457	−0.60%
2017	420	−1.67%
2023	386	−1.40%
Source: INSEE

== See also ==
- Communes of the Jura department
- Grozon coal and saltworks
