= Tourmont =

- Commune
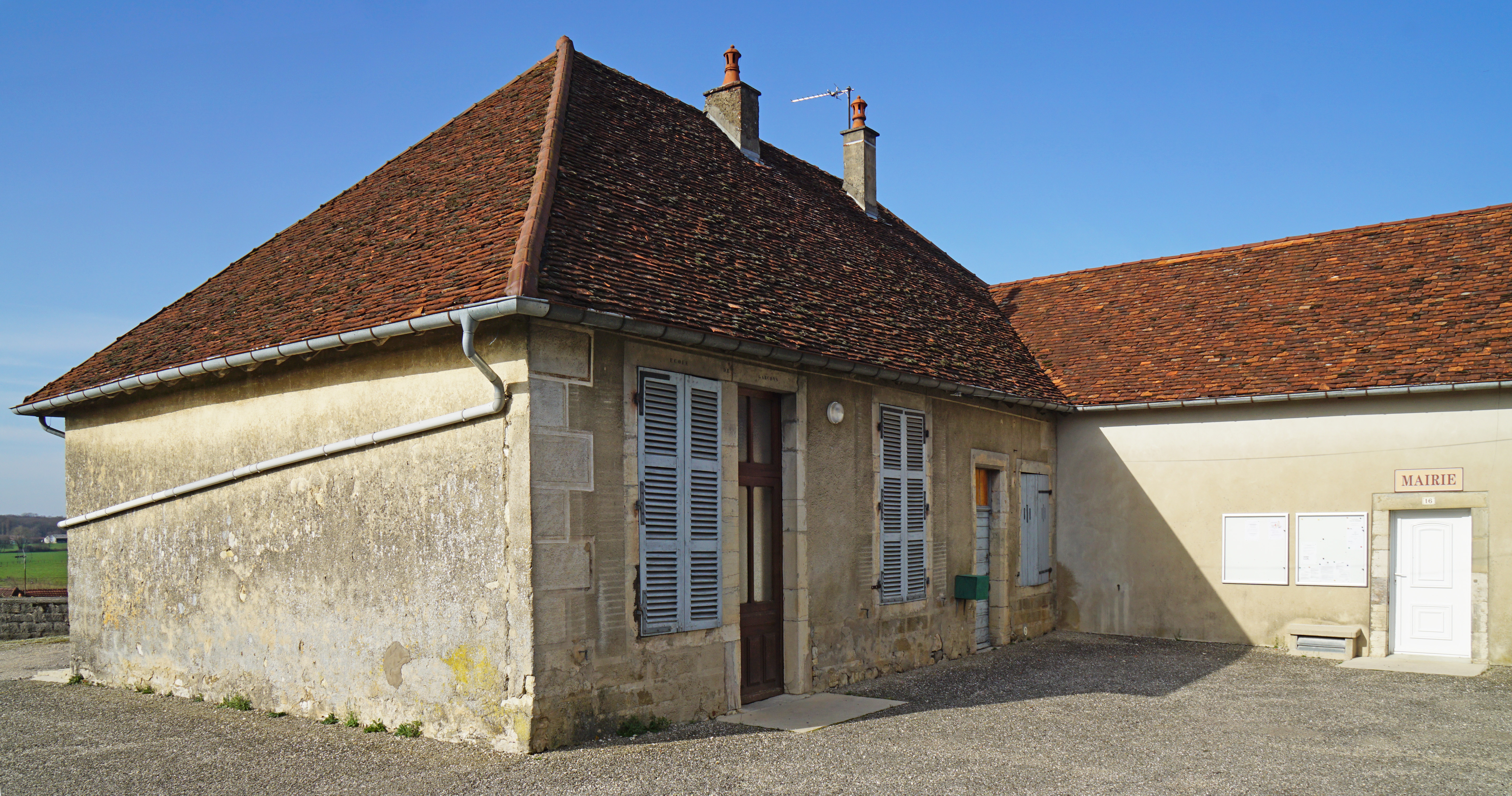
- The town hall in Tourmont
- Location of Tourmont
- Location within France Location within Bourgogne-Franche-Comté
- Coordinates: 46°51′41″N 5°40′58″E
- Country: France
- Region: Bourgogne-Franche-Comté
- Department: Jura
- Arrondissement: Dole
- Canton: Bletterans

Government
  - Mayor (2020–2026): Florence Sussot
- Area^{1}: 9.73 km^{2} (3.76 sq mi)
- Highest elevation: 302 m (991 ft)
- Lowest elevation: 239 m (784 ft)
- Population (2023): 437
  - Density: 44.9/km^{2} (116/sq mi)
- Time zone: UTC+01:00 (CET)
  - Summer (DST): UTC+02:00 (CEST)
- INSEE/Postal code: 39535 /39800
- ^{1} French Land Register data, which excludes lakes, ponds, glaciers > 1 km^{2} (0.386 sq mi or 247 acres) and river estuaries.

Tourmont (French pronunciation: [tuʁmɔ̃]) is a commune in the Jura department in the Bourgogne-Franche-Comté region in eastern France.

== Population ==
Historical population
Year	Pop.	±% p.a.
1968	328	—
1975	303	−1.13%
1982	308	+0.23%
1990	403	+3.42%
1999	442	+1.03%
2007	490	+1.30%
2012	468	−0.91%
2017	473	+0.21%
2023	437	−1.31%
Source: INSEE

== See also ==
- Communes of the Jura department
