= Sainte-Colombe, Doubs =

Sainte-Colombe
- Commune
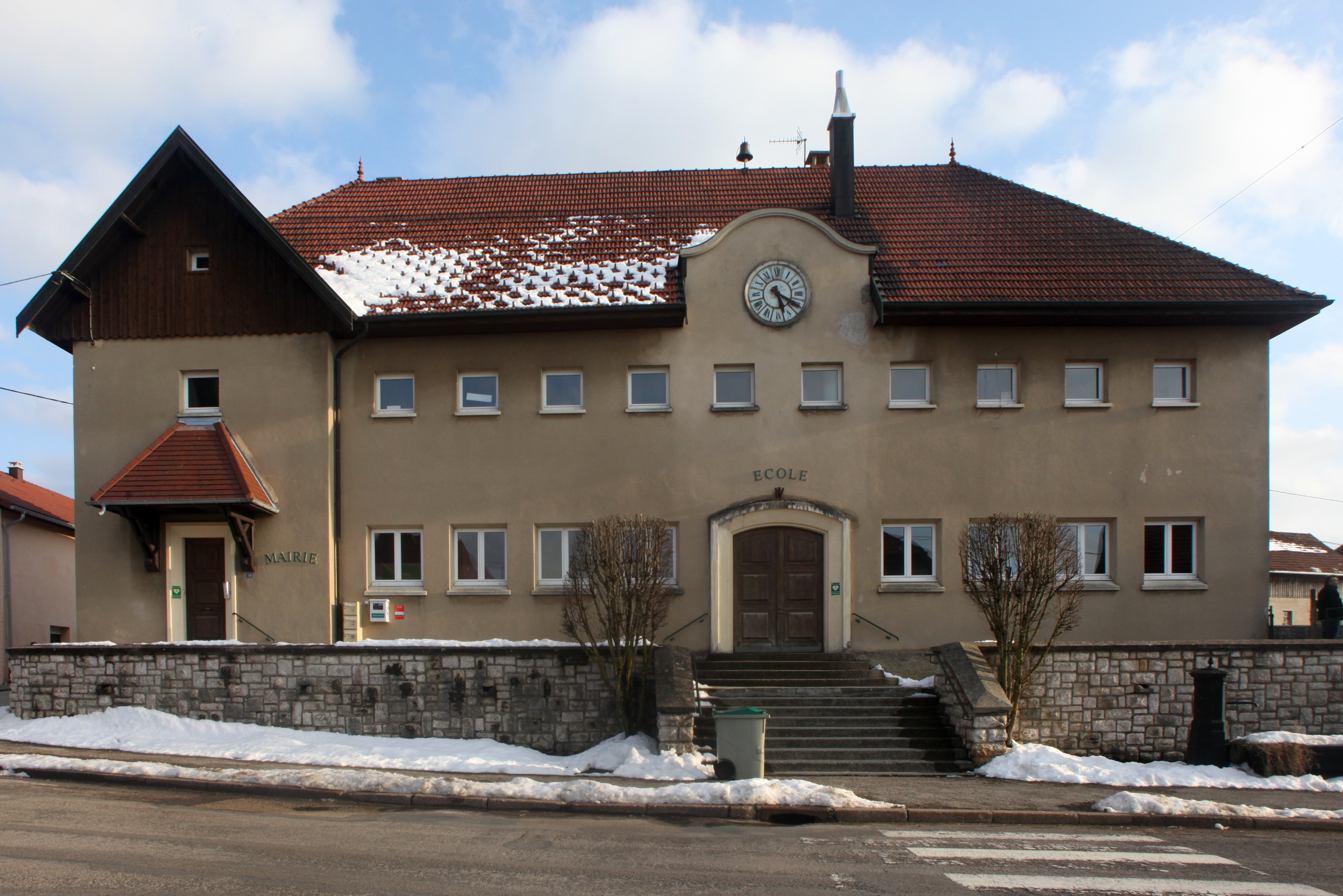
- The town hall in Sainte-Colombe
- Location of Sainte-Colombe
- Location within France Location within Bourgogne-Franche-Comté
- Coordinates: 46°52′46″N 6°16′05″E
- Country: France
- Region: Bourgogne-Franche-Comté
- Department: Doubs
- Arrondissement: Pontarlier
- Canton: Pontarlier

Government
  - Mayor (2020–2026): Lionel Malfroy
- Area^{1}: 10.49 km^{2} (4.05 sq mi)
- Highest elevation: 1,024 m (3,360 ft)
- Lowest elevation: 809 m (2,654 ft)
- Population (2023): 488
  - Density: 46.5/km^{2} (120/sq mi)
- Time zone: UTC+01:00 (CET)
  - Summer (DST): UTC+02:00 (CEST)
- INSEE/Postal code: 25515 /25300
- ^{1} French Land Register data, which excludes lakes, ponds, glaciers > 1 km^{2} (0.386 sq mi or 247 acres) and river estuaries.

Sainte-Colombe (French pronunciation: [sɛ̃t kɔlɔ̃b]) is a commune in the Doubs department in the Bourgogne-Franche-Comté region in eastern France.

== Geography ==
The commune lies 7 km (4.3 mi) northeast of Pontarlier in the valley of the Drugeon.

== Population ==
Historical population
Year	Pop.	±% p.a.
1968	152	—
1975	186	+2.93%
1982	224	+2.69%
1990	255	+1.63%
1999	232	−1.04%
2007	259	+1.39%
2012	361	+6.87%
2017	409	+2.53%
2023	488	+2.99%
Source: INSEE

== Transportation ==
The commune has a railway station, Sainte-Colombe, on the Frasne–Les Verrières line.

== See also ==
- Communes of the Doubs department
