= La Rivière station =

Railway station in La Rivière-Drugeon, France

La Rivière
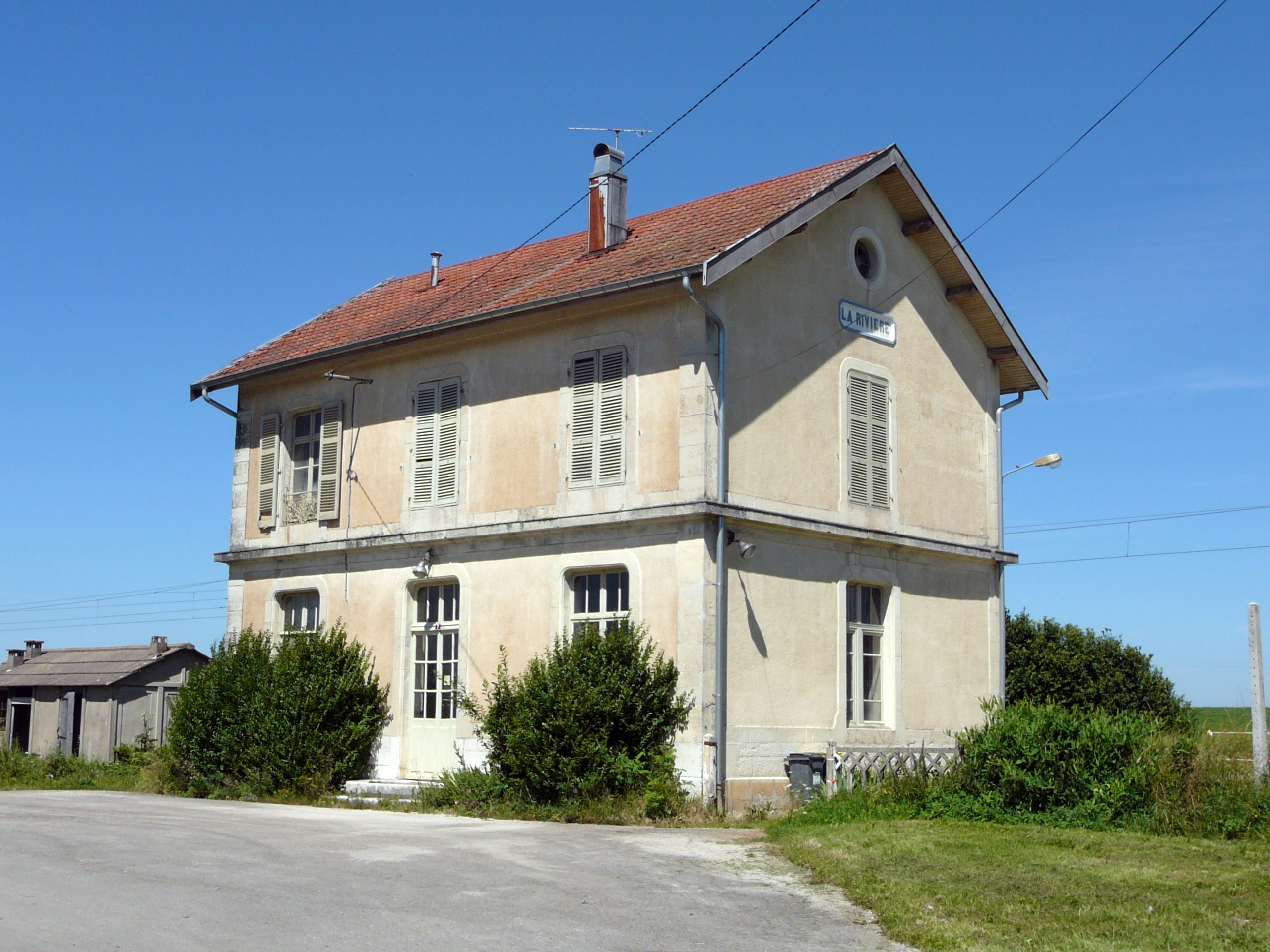
- The station building in 2007

General information
- Location: La Rivière-Drugeon; France
- Coordinates: 46°52′13″N 6°12′48″E
- Owner: SNCF
- Line: Frasne–Les Verrières line
- Distance: 441.7 km (274.5 mi) from Paris-Lyon
- Train operators: SNCF

Other information
- Station code: 87715144

Passengers
- 2018: 23,125

Services
Preceding station	TER Bourgogne-Franche-Comté	Following station
Frasne towards Dole	TER	Sainte-Colombe towards Pontarlier
Location

La Rivière station (French: Gare de La Rivière) is a railway station in the commune of La Rivière-Drugeon, in the French department of Doubs, in the Bourgogne-Franche-Comté region. It is an intermediate stop on the Frasne–Les Verrières line of SNCF.

== Services ==
The following services stop at La Rivière:

- TER Bourgogne-Franche-Comté: regional service between Dole-Ville and Pontarlier.
