= Fernier =

Fernier is a surname. Notable people with the surname include:

- Jean-Jacques Fernier (1931–2020), French architect and historian
- Robert Fernier (1895–1977), French painter
