= Labergement-Sainte-Marie =

- Commune
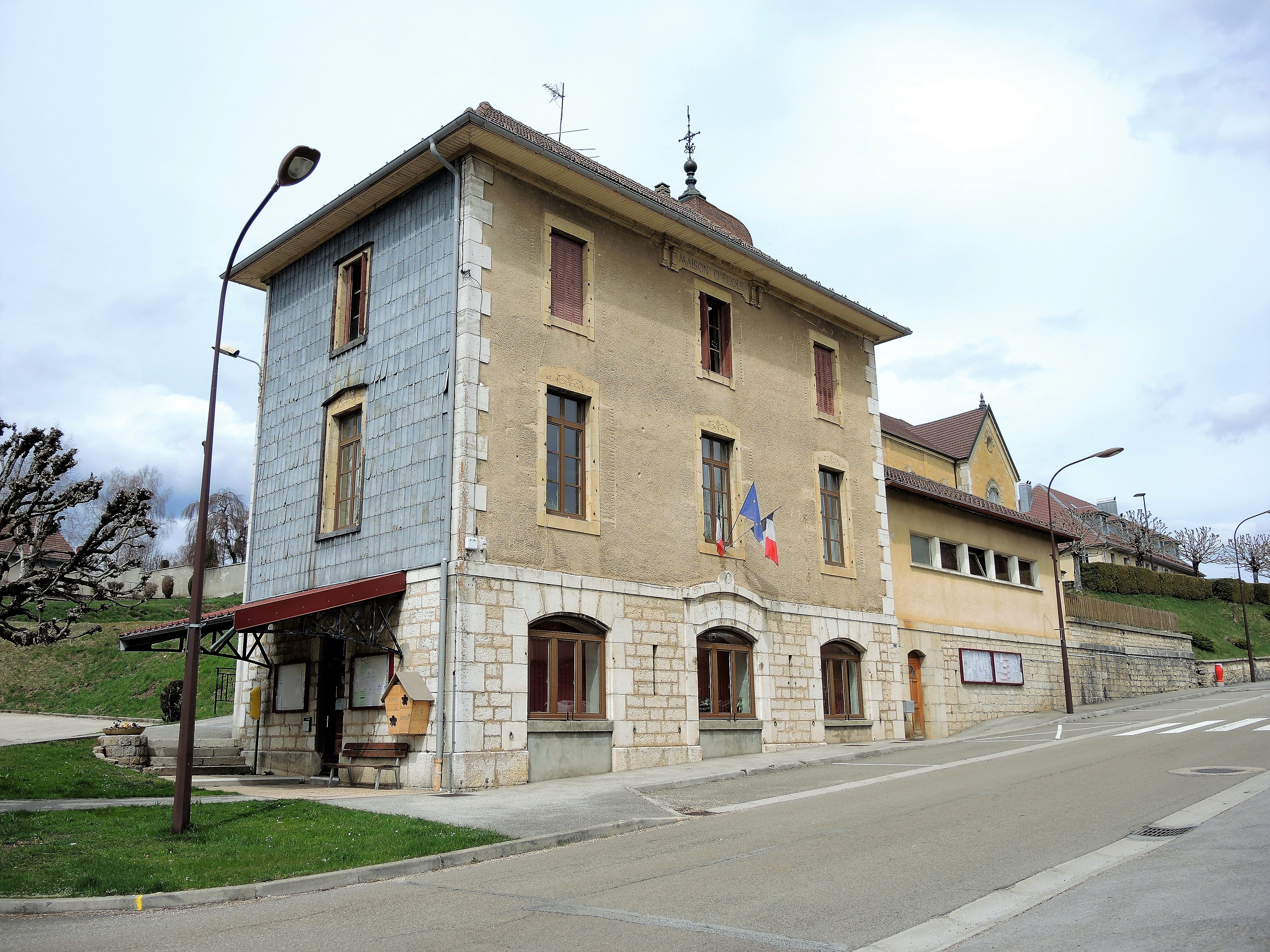
- Labergement-Sainte-Marie Town Hall
- Location of Labergement-Sainte-Marie
- Location within France Location within Bourgogne-Franche-Comté
- Coordinates: 46°46′32″N 6°16′51″E
- Country: France
- Region: Bourgogne-Franche-Comté
- Department: Doubs
- Arrondissement: Pontarlier
- Canton: Frasne

Government
  - Mayor (2020–2026): Ludovic Miroudot
- Area^{1}: 22.12 km^{2} (8.54 sq mi)
- Highest elevation: 1,054 m (3,458 ft)
- Lowest elevation: 846 m (2,776 ft)
- Population (2023): 1,273
  - Density: 57.55/km^{2} (149.1/sq mi)
- Time zone: UTC+01:00 (CET)
  - Summer (DST): UTC+02:00 (CEST)
- INSEE/Postal code: 25320 /25160
- ^{1} French Land Register data, which excludes lakes, ponds, glaciers > 1 km^{2} (0.386 sq mi or 247 acres) and river estuaries.

Labergement-Sainte-Marie (French pronunciation: [labɛʁʒəmɑ̃ sɛ̃t maʁi]) is a commune in the Doubs department in the Bourgogne-Franche-Comté region in Eastern France.

== Geography ==
The commune is situated 18 km (11 mi) south of Pontarlier between the Lac de Remoray and Lac de Saint-Point. It is dominated by the Bois de Ban and the forests of Fuvelle and Grande Côte.

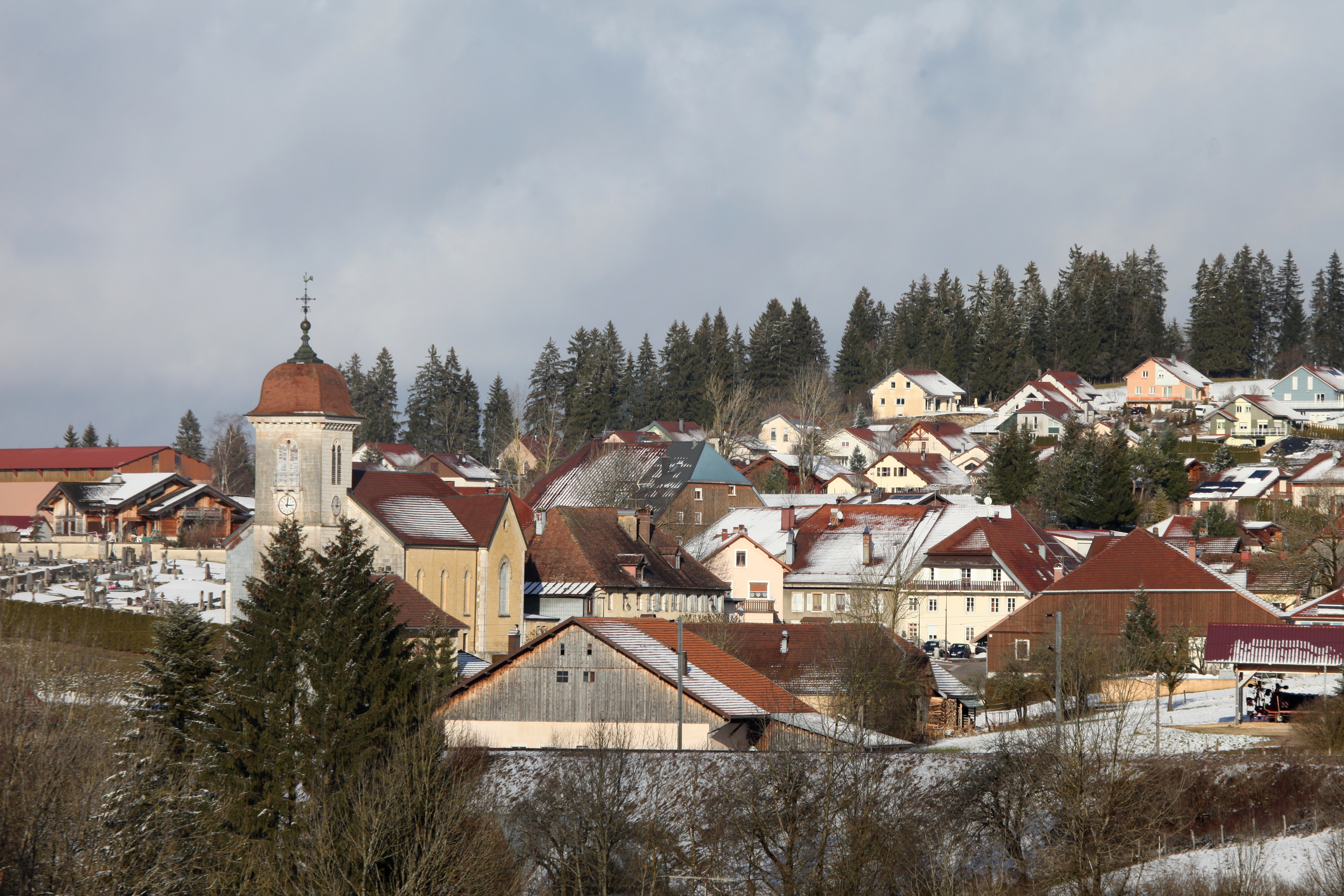
Labergement-Sainte-Marie in the winter

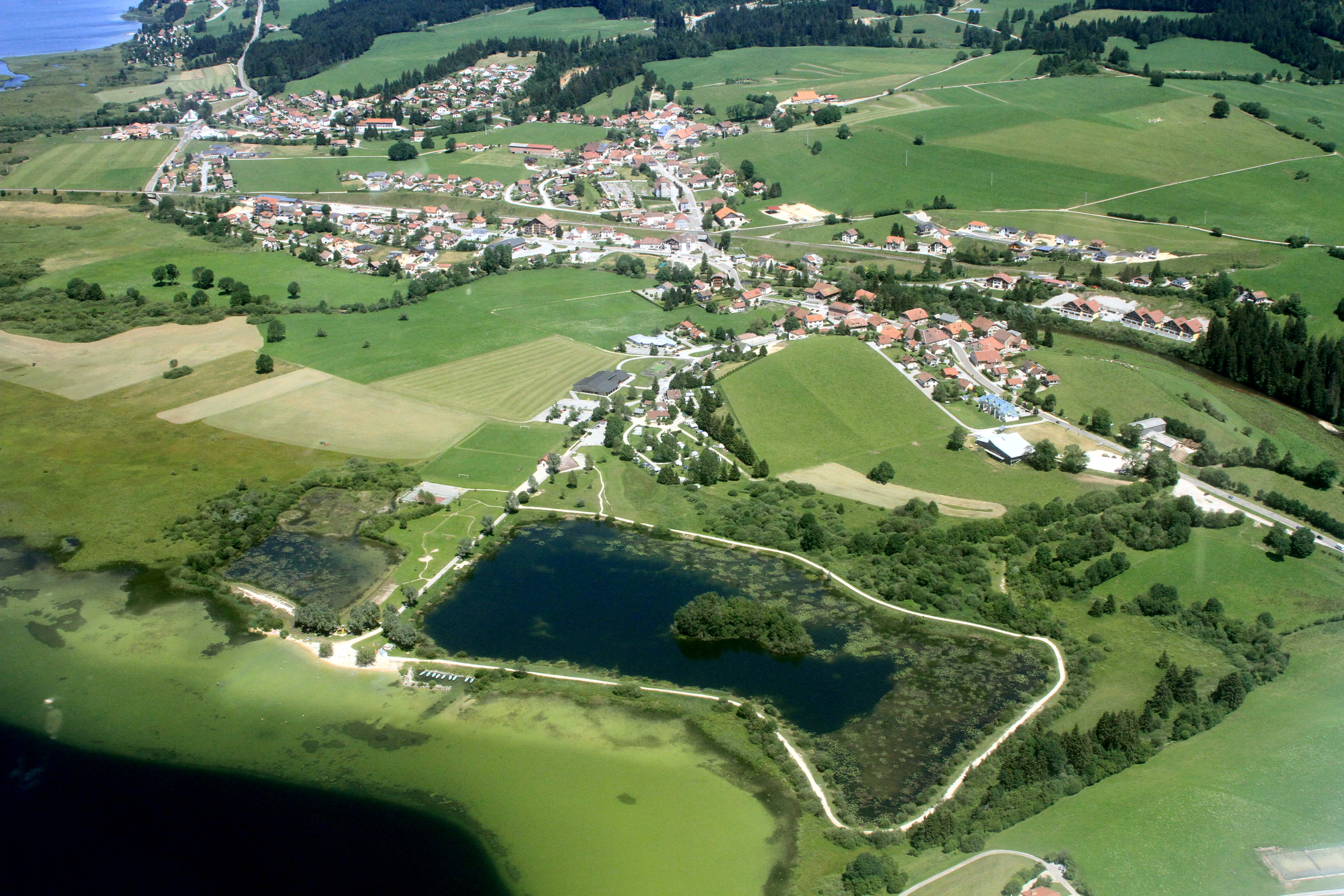
Labergement-Sainte-Marie seen from the air

== History ==
The commune was formed from the former communes Labergement-Sainte-Marie and Granges-Sainte-Marie in 1973. Both took their names from the Cistercian abbey of Mont-Sainte-Marie.

== Demographics ==
Historical population
Year	Pop.	±% p.a.
1968	541	—
1975	565	+0.62%
1982	702	+3.15%
1990	864	+2.63%
1999	920	+0.70%
2007	1,021	+1.31%
2012	1,137	+2.18%
2017	1,198	+1.05%
2023	1,273	+1.02%
Source: INSEE

Inhabitants are called Abergeurs (masculine) et Abergeuses (feminine) in French.

== Tourism ==
The rich natural resources of the commune attract many visitors to the lakes and forests. There are numerous hotels, hostels, and furnished apartments available for the visitor, as well as a campground.

== Transportation ==
The commune has a railway station, Labergement-Sainte-Marie, on the Dijon–Vallorbe line.

== See also ==
- Communes of the Doubs department
