= Labergement-Sainte-Marie station =

Railway station in Labergement-Sainte-Marie, France

Labergement-Sainte-Marie
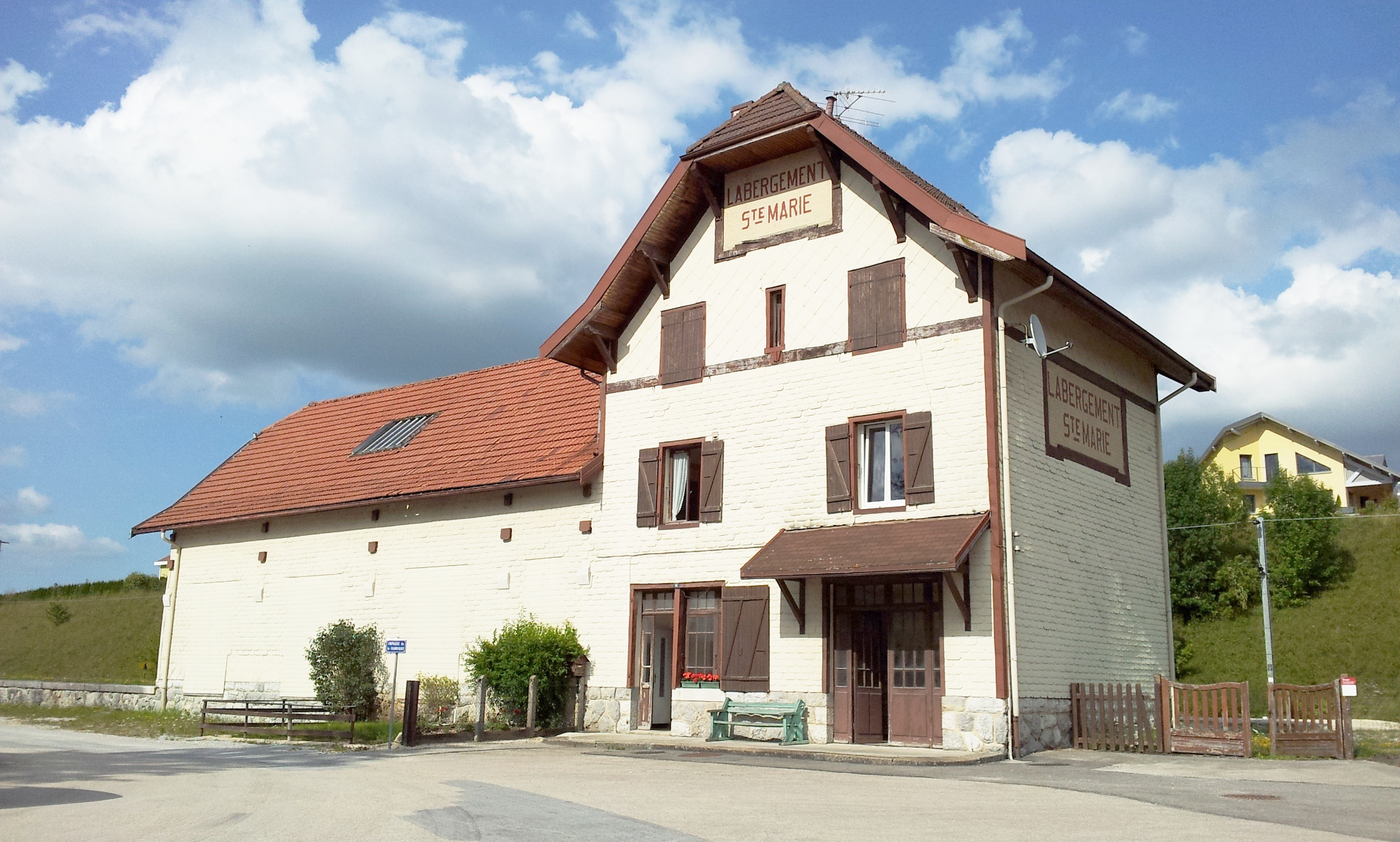
- The station building in 2011

General information
- Location: Labergement-Sainte-Marie; France
- Coordinates: 46°46′35″N 6°16′48″E
- Owner: SNCF
- Line: Dijon–Vallorbe line
- Distance: 450.8 km (280.1 mi) from Paris-Lyon
- Train operators: SNCF

Other information
- Station code: 87715219

Passengers
- 2018: 7,977

Services
Preceding station	TER Bourgogne-Franche-Comté	Following station
Frasne towards Pontarlier	TER	Vallorbe Terminus
Location

Labergement-Sainte-Marie station (French: Gare de Labergement-Sainte-Marie) is a railway station in the commune of Labergement-Sainte-Marie, in the French department of Doubs, in the Bourgogne-Franche-Comté region. It is an intermediate stop on the Dijon–Vallorbe line of SNCF.

== Services ==
The following services stop at Labergement-Sainte-Marie:

- TER Bourgogne-Franche-Comté: regional service between Pontarlier and Vallorbe, in Switzerland.
