= Lac de Remoray =

Lake in Doubs D epartment, France

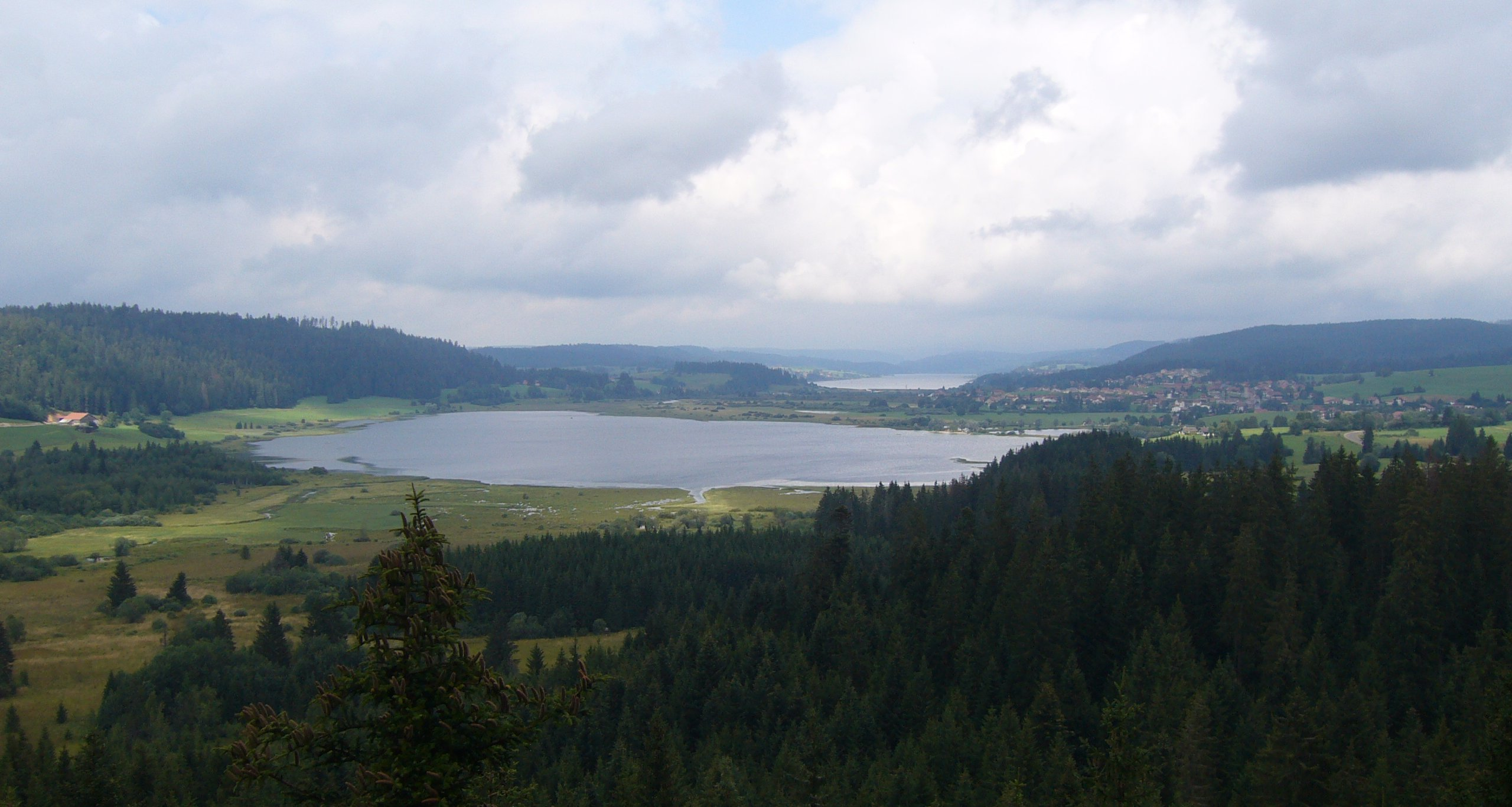
- The lake with Lac de Saint-Point in the background

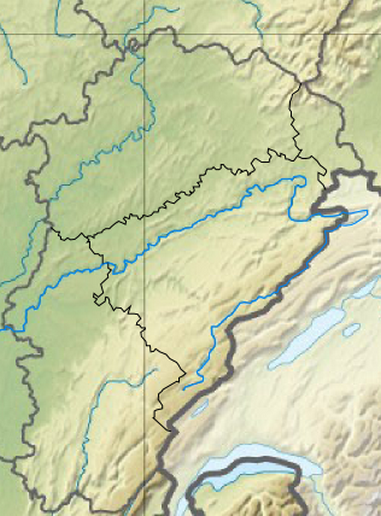
- Location within Franche-Comté
- Location: Doubs department, Franche-Comté
- Coordinates: 46°46′4.8″N 6°15′46.8″E
- Primary inflows: Drésuire, Lhaut
- Primary outflows: la Taverne
- Basin countries: France
- Surface area: 95 ha (230 acres)
- Max. depth: 27 m (89 ft)
- Surface elevation: 850 m (2,790 ft)

Lac de Remoray is a lake in the Doubs department of France. Located in the municipalities of Remoray-Boujeons and Labergement-Sainte-Marie, the lake is near Lac de Saint-Point. The lake and its surroundings were made a nature reserve in 1980.
