= La Rivière-Drugeon =

- Commune
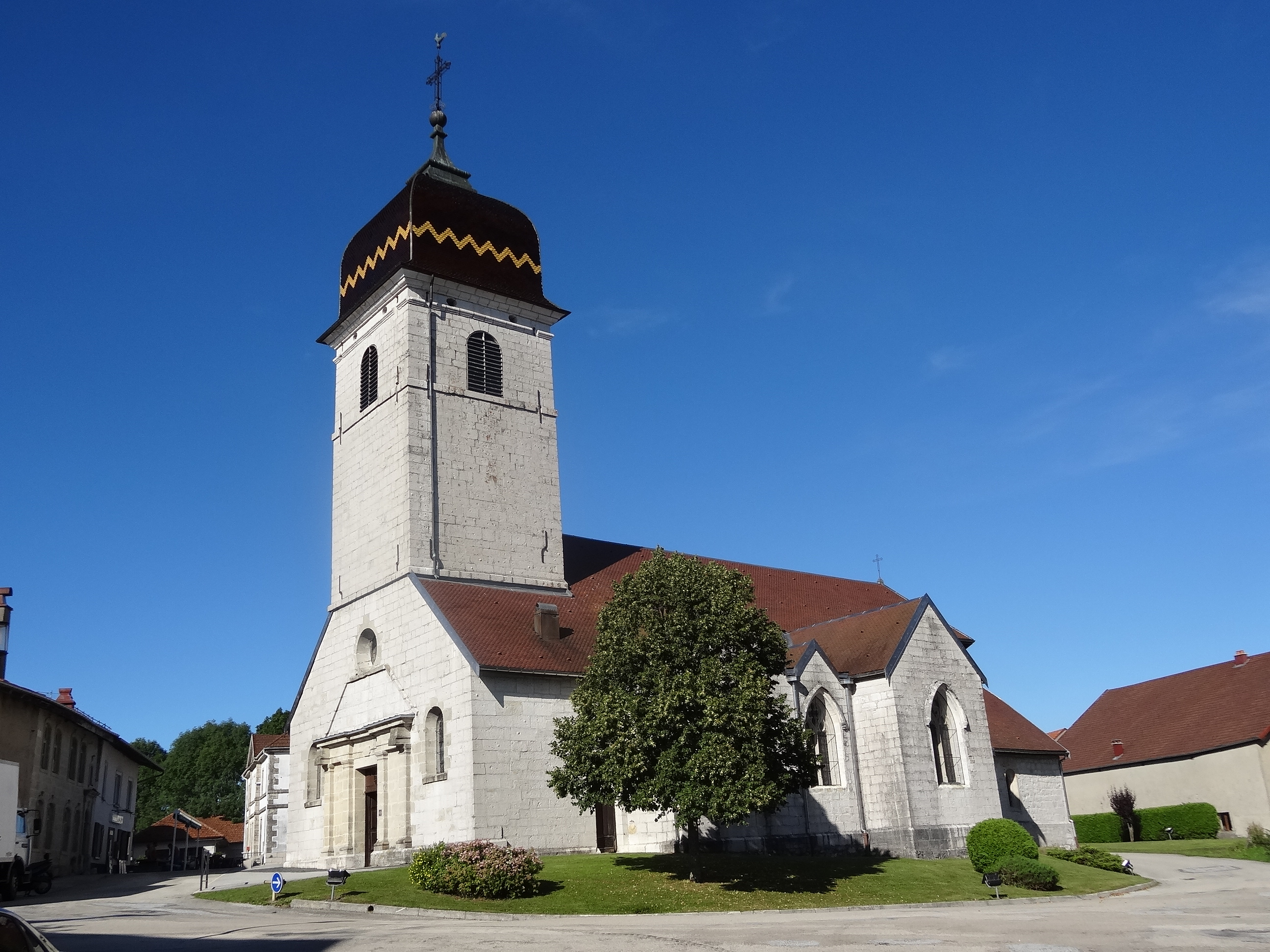
- The parish church in La Rivière-Drugeon

- Coat of arms
- Location of La Rivière-Drugeon
- Location within France Location within Bourgogne-Franche-Comté
- Coordinates: 46°52′06″N 6°13′00″E
- Country: France
- Region: Bourgogne-Franche-Comté
- Department: Doubs
- Arrondissement: Pontarlier
- Canton: Frasne
- Intercommunality: Plateau de Frasne et Val du Drugeon

Government
  - Mayor (2020–2026): Christian Vallet
- Area^{1}: 19.16 km^{2} (7.40 sq mi)
- Highest elevation: 1,112 m (3,648 ft)
- Lowest elevation: 810 m (2,660 ft)
- Population (2023): 933
  - Density: 48.7/km^{2} (126/sq mi)
- Time zone: UTC+01:00 (CET)
  - Summer (DST): UTC+02:00 (CEST)
- INSEE/Postal code: 25493 /25560
- ^{1} French Land Register data, which excludes lakes, ponds, glaciers > 1 km^{2} (0.386 sq mi or 247 acres) and river estuaries.

La Rivière-Drugeon (French pronunciation: [la ʁivjɛʁ dʁyʒɔ̃]; Arpitan: La Revire) is a commune in the Doubs department in the Bourgogne-Franche-Comté region in eastern France.

== Population ==
Historical population
Year	Pop.	±% p.a.
1968	554	—
1975	466	−2.44%
1982	520	+1.58%
1990	635	+2.53%
1999	645	+0.17%
2007	750	+1.90%
2012	862	+2.82%
2017	902	+0.91%
2023	933	+0.56%
Source: INSEE

== Transport ==
The commune has a railway station, La Rivière, on the Frasne–Les Verrières line.

== See also ==
- Communes of the Doubs department
