= Sainte-Colombe station =

Railway station in Sainte-Colombe, France

Sainte-Colombe
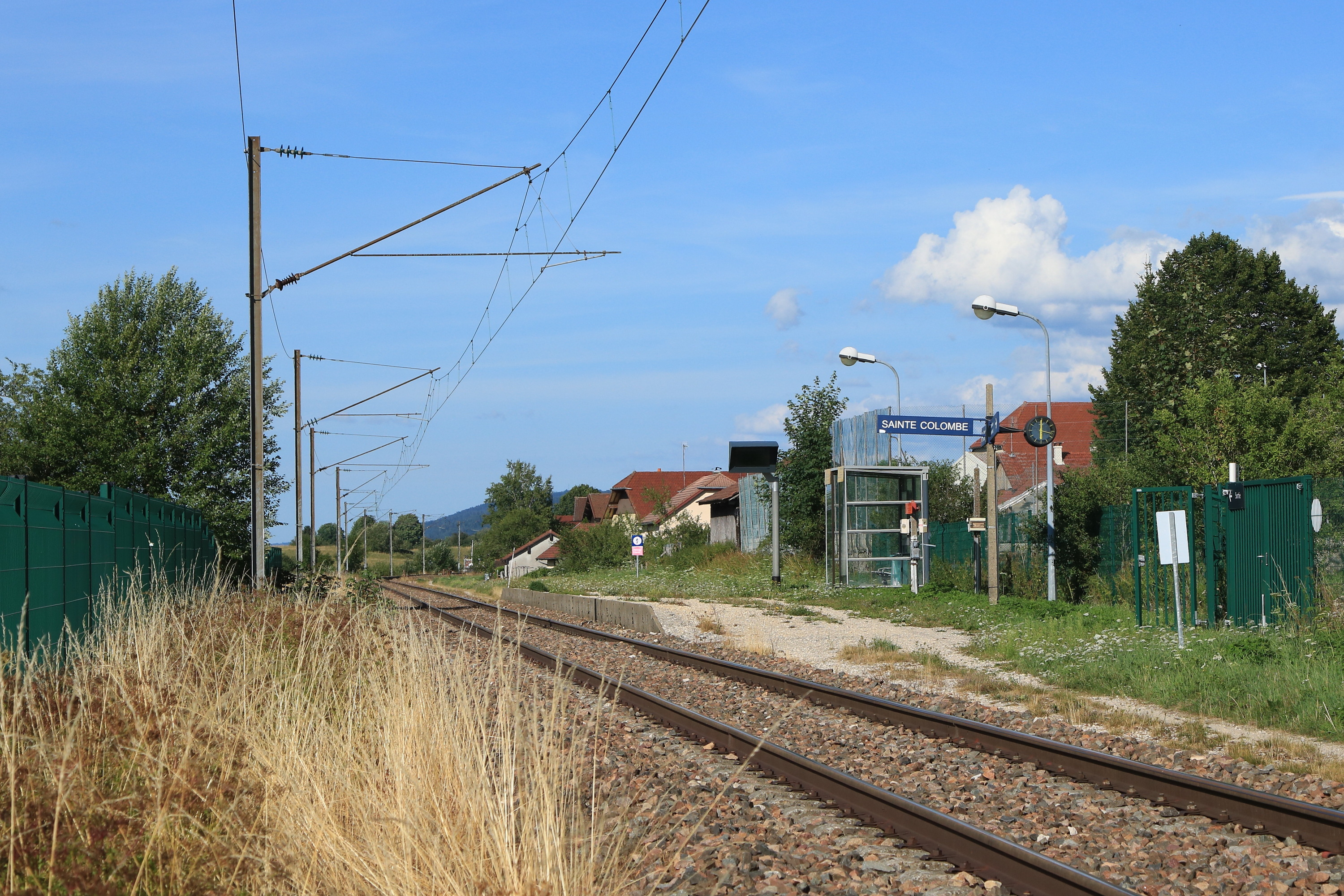
- The station in 2019

General information
- Location: Sainte-Colombe; France
- Coordinates: 46°52′45″N 6°15′58″E
- Owner: SNCF
- Line: Frasne–Les Verrières line
- Distance: 446.2 km (277.3 mi) from Paris-Lyon
- Train operators: SNCF

Other information
- Station code: 87715151

Passengers
- 2018: 13,993

Services
Preceding station	TER Bourgogne-Franche-Comté	Following station
La Rivière towards Dole	TER	Pontarlier Terminus
Location

Sainte-Colombe station (French: Gare de Sainte-Colombe) is a railway station in the commune of Sainte-Colombe, in the French department of Doubs, in the Bourgogne-Franche-Comté region. It is an intermediate stop on the Frasne–Les Verrières line of SNCF.

== Services ==
The following services stop at Sainte-Colombe:

- TER Bourgogne-Franche-Comté: regional service between Dole-Ville and Pontarlier.
