= Remoray-Boujeons =

- Commune
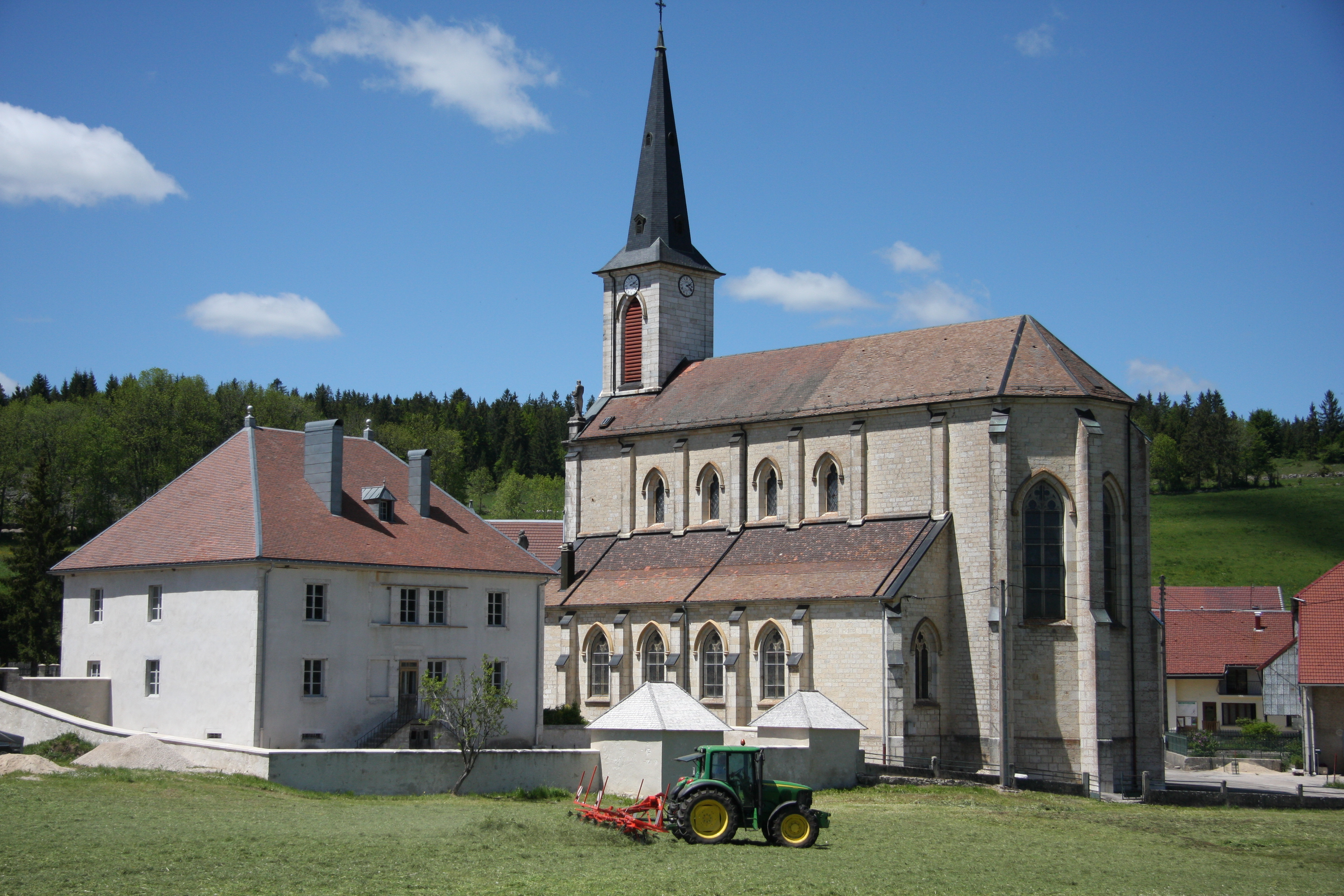
- Église Saint-Anne
- Location of Remoray-Boujeons
- Location within France Location within Bourgogne-Franche-Comté
- Coordinates: 46°46′06″N 6°14′23″E
- Country: France
- Region: Bourgogne-Franche-Comté
- Department: Doubs
- Arrondissement: Pontarlier
- Canton: Frasne

Government
  - Mayor (2020–2026): Jean-Marie Pourcelot
- Area^{1}: 15.15 km^{2} (5.85 sq mi)
- Highest elevation: 1,166 m (3,825 ft)
- Lowest elevation: 849 m (2,785 ft)
- Population (2023): 466
  - Density: 30.8/km^{2} (79.7/sq mi)
- Time zone: UTC+01:00 (CET)
  - Summer (DST): UTC+02:00 (CEST)
- INSEE/Postal code: 25486 /25160
- ^{1} French Land Register data, which excludes lakes, ponds, glaciers > 1 km^{2} (0.386 sq mi or 247 acres) and river estuaries.

Remoray-Boujeons is a commune in the Doubs department in the Bourgogne-Franche-Comté region in Eastern France.

== Population ==
Historical population
Year	Pop.	±% p.a.
1968	256	—
1975	220	−2.14%
1982	184	−2.52%
1990	210	+1.67%
1999	284	+3.41%
2007	314	+1.26%
2012	381	+3.94%
2017	428	+2.35%
2023	466	+1.43%
Source: INSEE

== Gallery ==
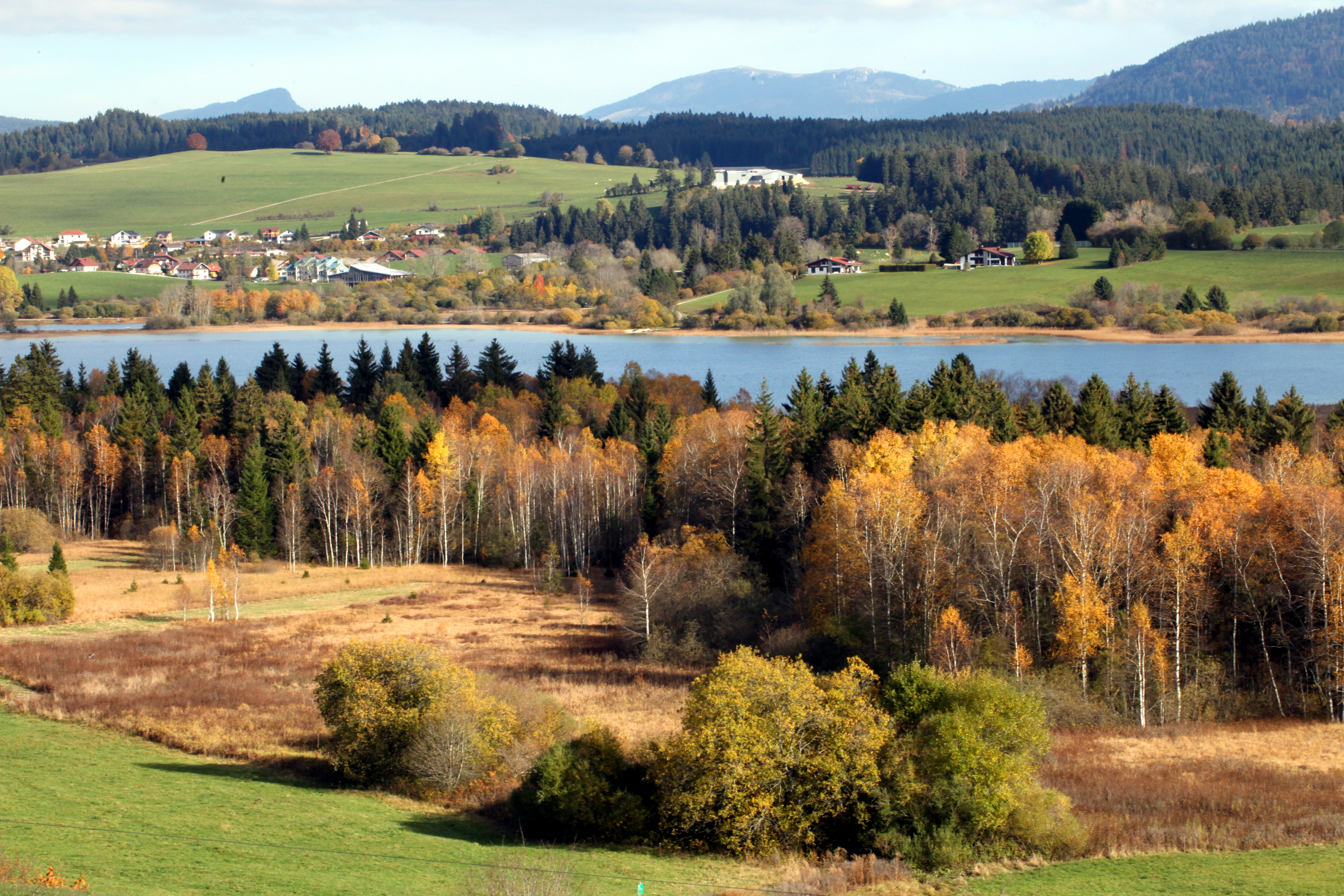
The Lac de Remoray and Labergement-Sainte-Marie seen from Remoray-Boujeons

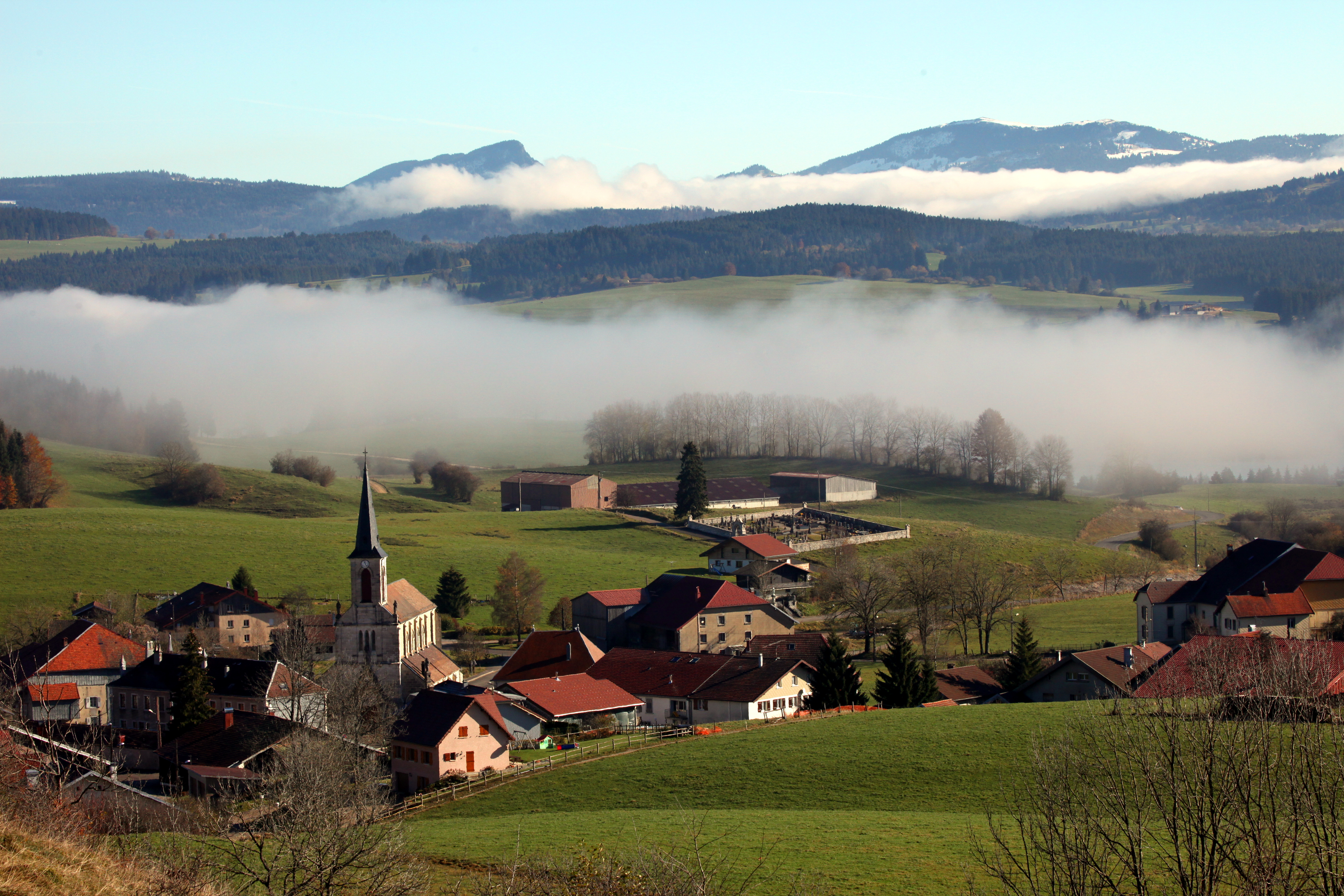
View of Remoray

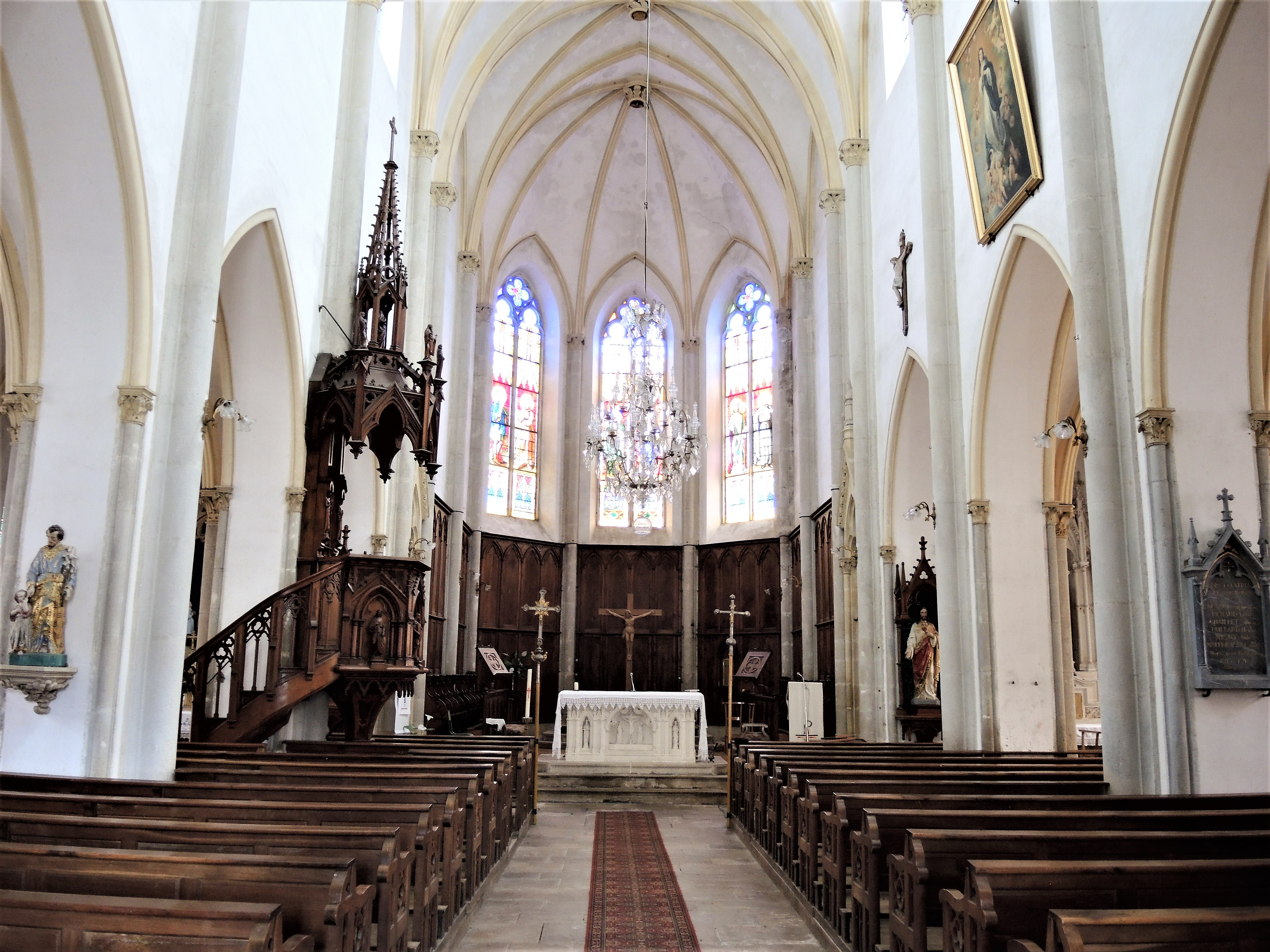
Inside of Église Sainte-Anne in Remoray

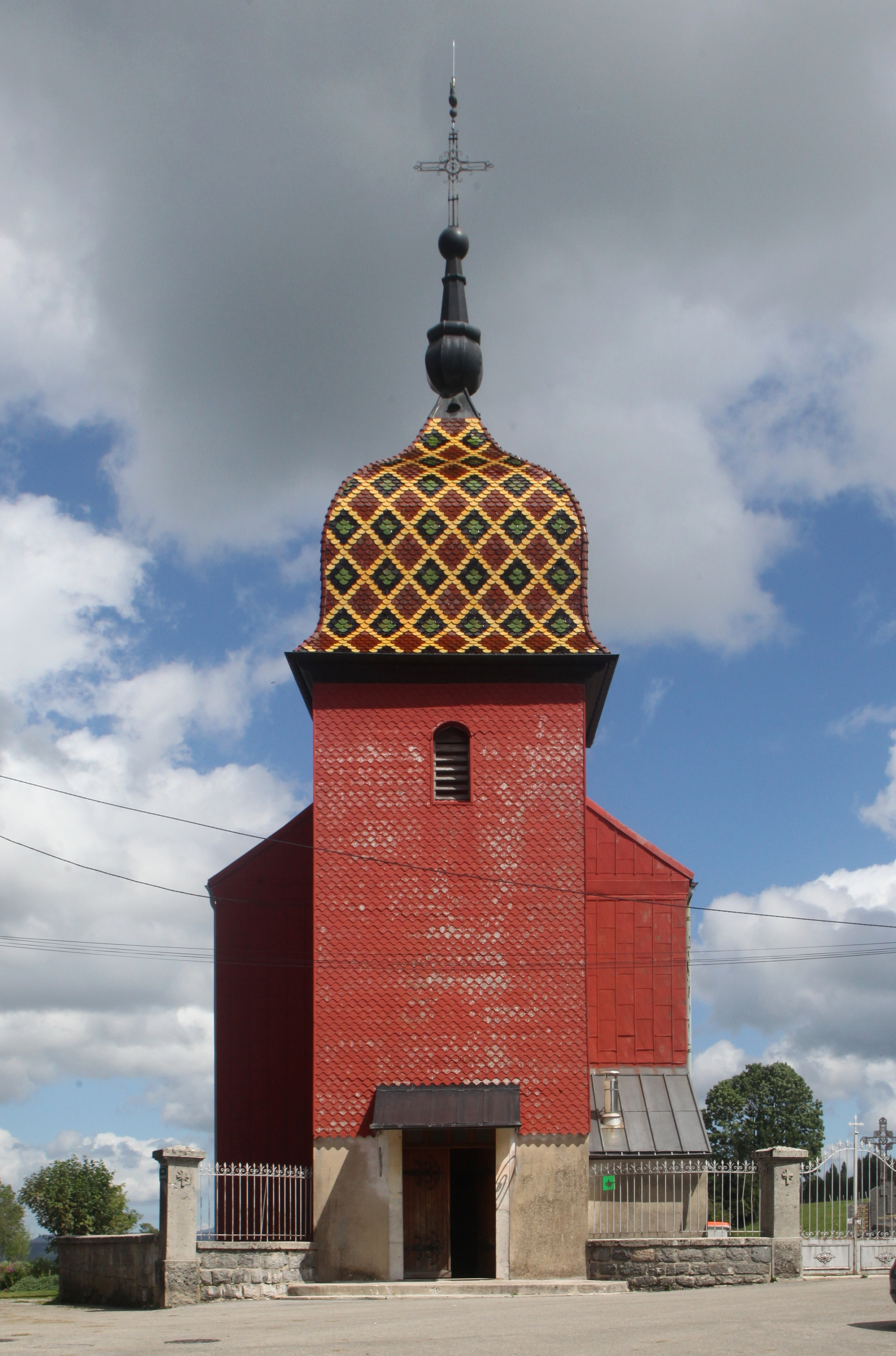
Église de la Nativité-de-la-Vierge in Boujeons

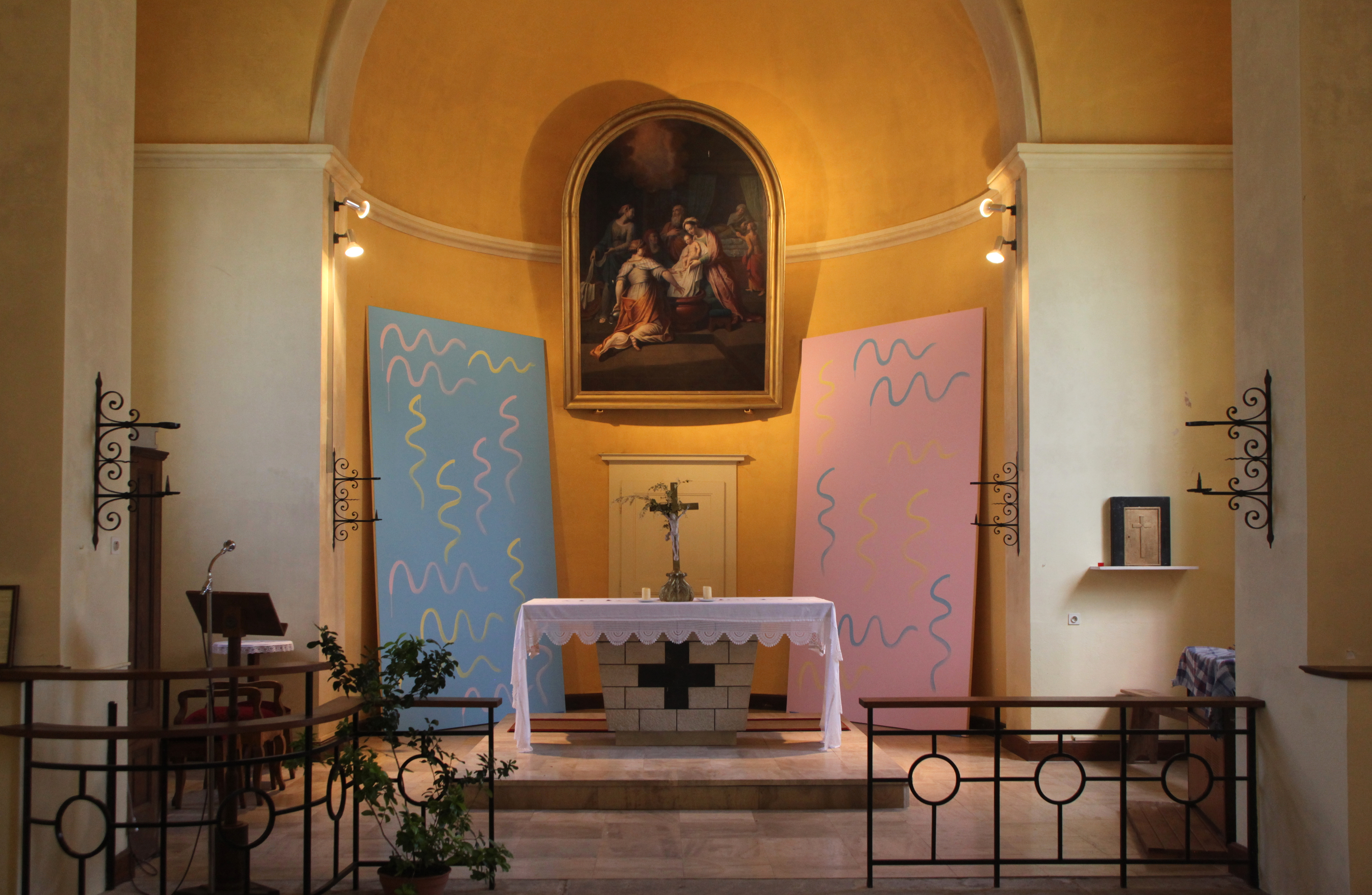
Inside of the Église de la Nativité-de-la-Vierge

== See also ==
- Communes of the Doubs department
