= Saint-Point-Lac =

- Commune
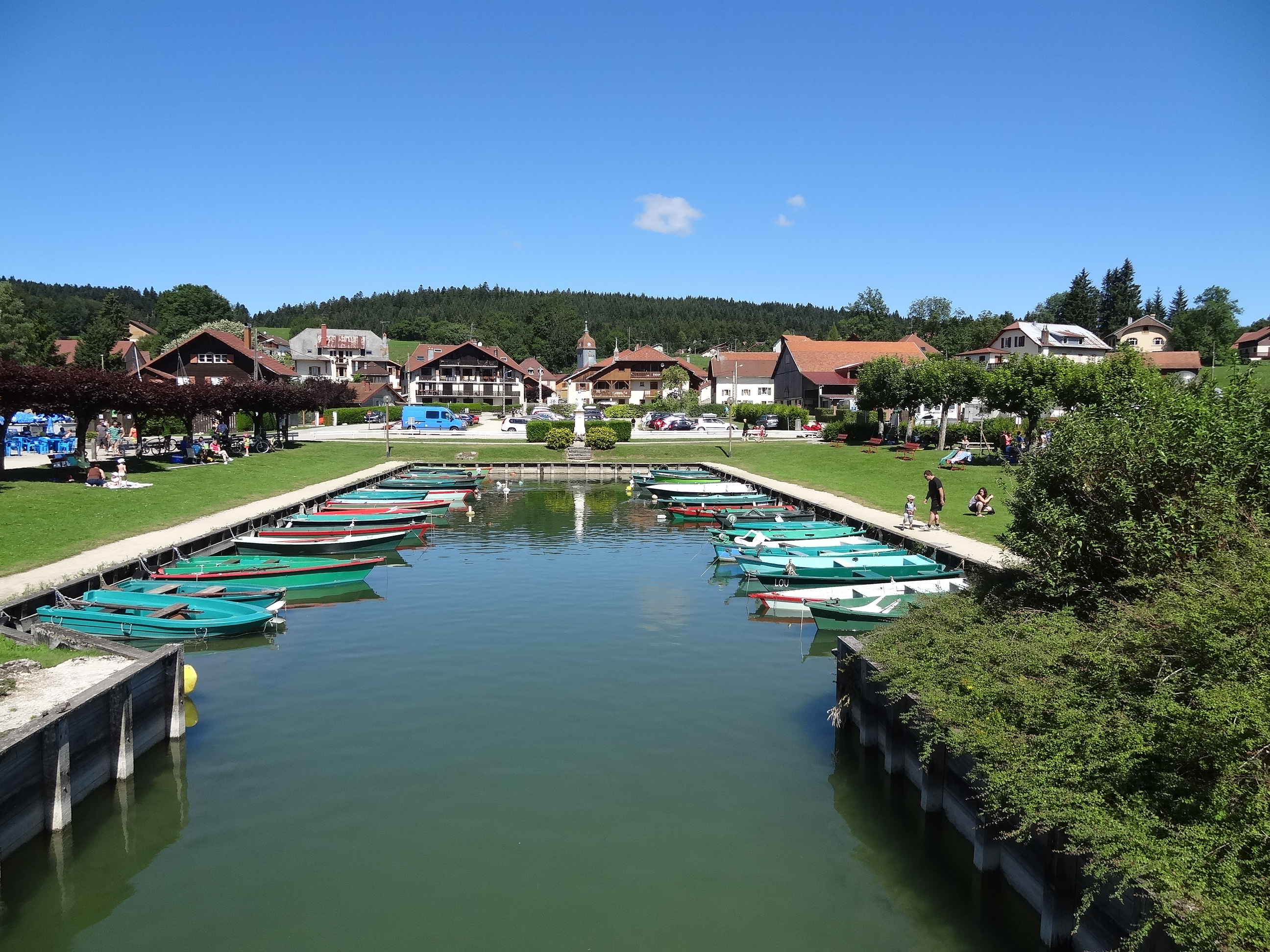
- The moorings in Saint-Point-Lac
- Location of Saint-Point-Lac
- Location within France Location within Bourgogne-Franche-Comté
- Coordinates: 46°48′51″N 6°18′11″E
- Country: France
- Region: Bourgogne-Franche-Comté
- Department: Doubs
- Arrondissement: Pontarlier
- Canton: Frasne

Government
  - Mayor (2020–2026): Patricia Fagiani
- Area^{1}: 4.52 km^{2} (1.75 sq mi)
- Highest elevation: 981 m (3,219 ft)
- Lowest elevation: 847 m (2,779 ft)
- Population (2023): 306
  - Density: 67.7/km^{2} (175/sq mi)
- Time zone: UTC+01:00 (CET)
  - Summer (DST): UTC+02:00 (CEST)
- INSEE/Postal code: 25525 /25160
- ^{1} French Land Register data, which excludes lakes, ponds, glaciers > 1 km^{2} (0.386 sq mi or 247 acres) and river estuaries.

Saint-Point-Lac (French pronunciation: [sɛ̃ pwɛ̃ lak]) is a commune in the Doubs department in the Bourgogne-Franche-Comté region in eastern France.

== Geography ==
The commune lies 15 km (9.3 mi) southwest of Pontarlier on the west side of the Lac de Saint-Point.

== Population ==
Historical population
Year	Pop.	±% p.a.
1968	96	—
1975	102	+0.87%
1982	98	−0.57%
1990	134	+3.99%
1999	190	+3.96%
2007	251	+3.54%
2012	265	+1.09%
2017	281	+1.18%
2023	306	+1.43%
Source: INSEE

== See also ==
- Communes of the Doubs department
