= Pontarlier Airfield =

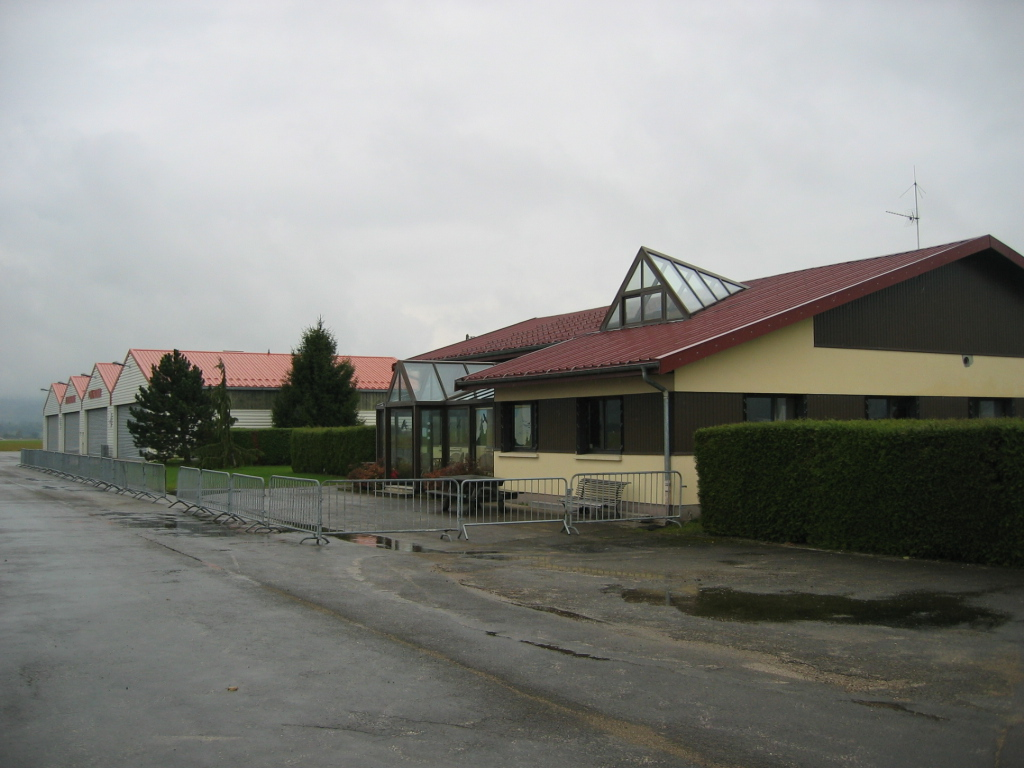
- IATA: none; ICAO: LFSP

Summary
- Airport type: Civil
- Owner/Operator: Town of Pontarlier
- Serves: Pontarlier
- Location: France
- Opened: March 12, 1930
- Elevation AMSL: 818 m (2,684 ft)
- Coordinates: 46°54′30″N 006°19′45″E
- Website: aeroclub-pontarlier.org

Map
- Location within France

Runways
Direction	Length		Surface
Direction	ft	m	Surface
02/20	3,280	1,000	Asphalt
02/20	2,805	855	Grass

Pontarlier Airfield (ICAO: LFSP) is a French municipal aerodrome located near Pontarlier in the department of Doubs, region of Franche-Comté, 400 km southeast of Paris. It is managed by the town of Pontarlier, and is open to the public.

The land around Pontarlier Airport is hilly in the east and flat in the west. The highest part is located 6.4 km east of Pontarlier Airport, and has an elevation of 1,275 meters above sea level. The area around the airport has a population density of 56 people per square kilometer.

== Tenants ==
- Pontarlier Aéroclub (flying lessons)
- Ultralight Club
- SE Aviation
