= Frasne station =

Railway station in Frasne, France

Frasne
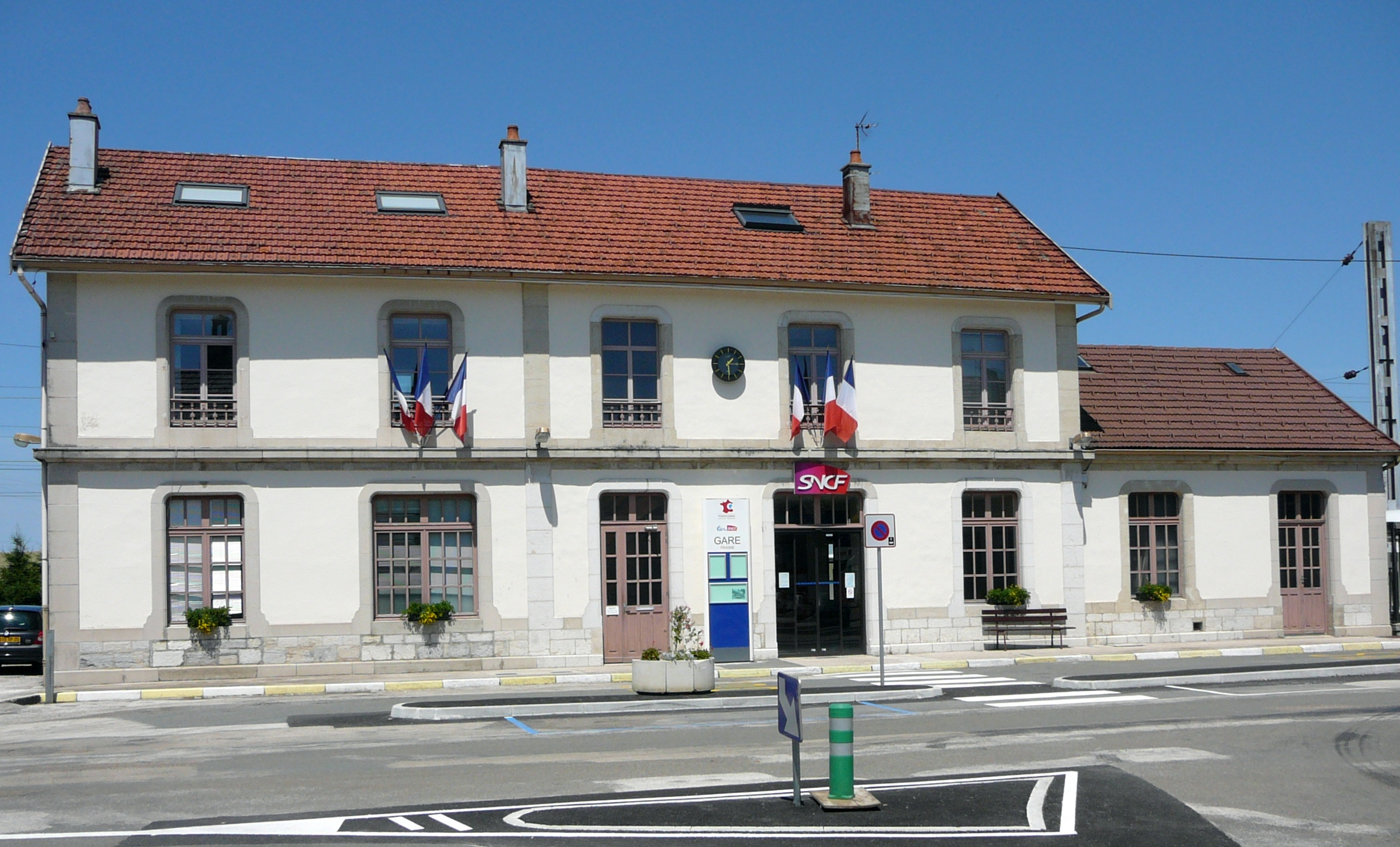
- The station building in 2007

General information
- Location: Frasne; France
- Coordinates: 46°51′27″N 6°09′28″E
- Owner: SNCF
- Lines: Dijon–Vallorbe line; Frasne–Les Verrières line
- Distance: 437.2 km (271.7 mi) from Paris-Lyon
- Platforms: 3
- Tracks: 4
- Train operators: SNCF; Swiss Federal Railways

Other information
- Station code: 87715136

History
- Opened: 10 June 1855; 171 years ago

Passengers
- 2018: 154,920

Services
Preceding station	TGV Lyria	Following station
Mouchard towards Paris-Lyon	Paris to Lausanne	Vallorbe towards Lausanne
Preceding station	TER Bourgogne-Franche-Comté	Following station
Andelot towards Dole	TER	La Rivière towards Pontarlier
Pontarlier Terminus	TER	Labergement-Sainte-Marie towards Vallorbe
Preceding station	SBB CFF FFS	Following station
Terminus	RE9	Pontarlier towards Neuchâtel
Location
- Location within France Location within Bourgogne-Franche-Comté

Frasne station is a railway station located in Frasne, Doubs, France. The station was opened on 10 June 1855 and is located on the Dijon–Vallorbe and Frasne–Les Verrières lines. The train services are operated by SNCF and Swiss Federal Railways.

== Services ==
The following services stop at Frasne:

- TGV Lyria: high-speed service between Paris-Lyon and Lausanne.
- TER Bourgogne-Franche-Comté: regional service to Pontarlier, Dole-Ville, and Vallorbe.
- RegioExpress: connecting service with the TGV Lyria to Neuchâtel.
