= Philippe Grenier =

French politician (1865–1944)

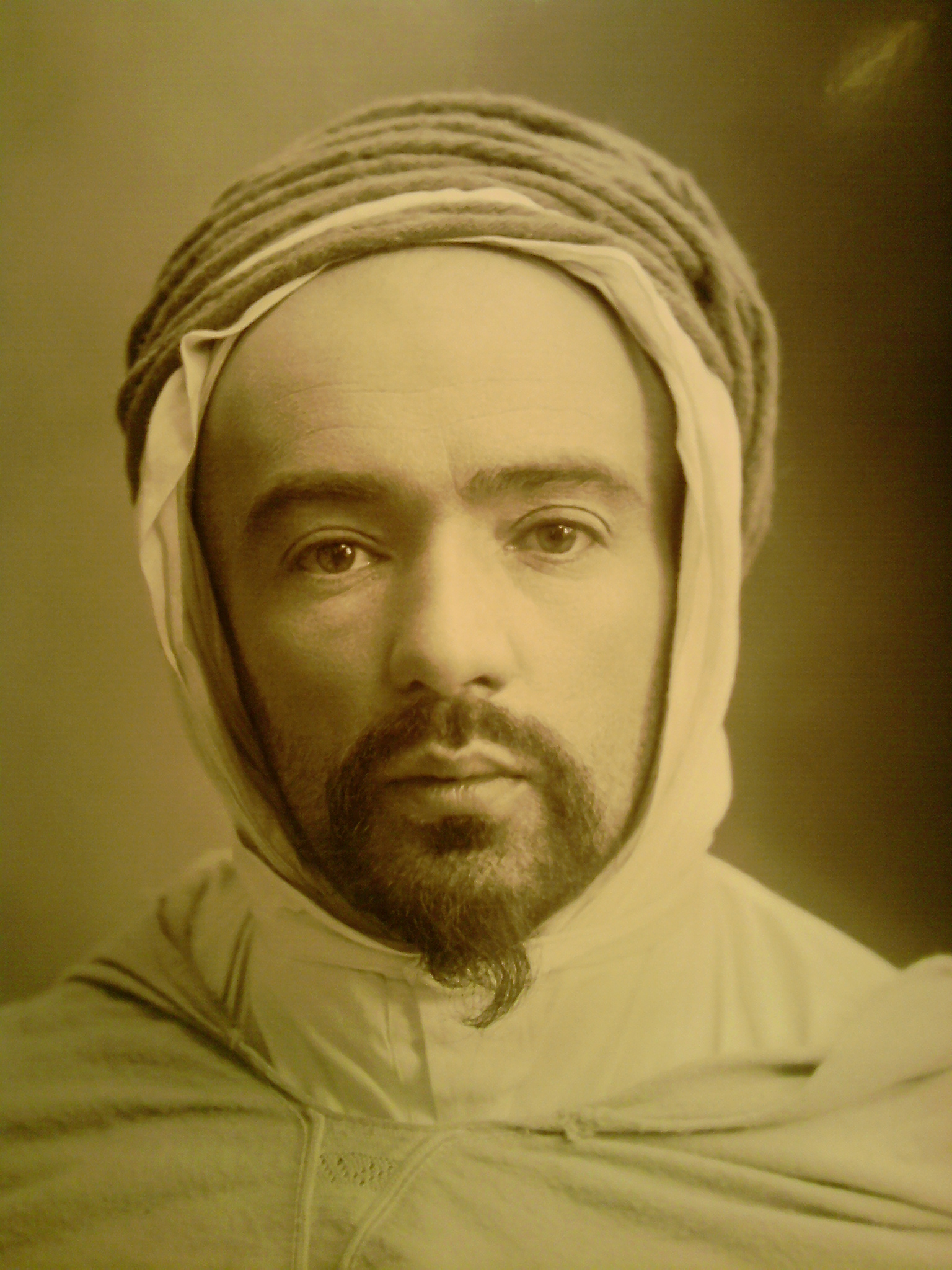

Member of the Chamber of Deputies for Doubs
- In office 20 December 1896 – 31 May 1898

Personal details
- Born: 14 August 1865 Pontarlier, France
- Died: 25 March 1944 (aged 78) Pontarlier, France
- Occupation: Doctor, politician

Philippe Grenier (French pronunciation: [filip ɡʁənje]; 14 August 1865 – 25 March 1944) was a French politician who served as a member of the Chamber of Deputies for Doubs from 1896 to 1898. He became a convert to Islam during a trip to French Algeria in 1894 and later the first Muslim member of the French Parliament in history.

== Career ==
Grenier studied in Besançon and Paris. A doctor by occupation in his home town of Pontarlier, he became a municipal councillor by campaigning on public health issues and public assistance.

He was later elected to the French Parliament with 51% of the vote in the second round in 1896; in the Chamber of Deputies he was registered as a member of the Radical Left. Mainly because of his support for regulatory laws on alcohol, he was not reelected in 1898. He ran for the seat again in 1902 but was beaten a second time.

Philippe Grenier's visit to French Parliament in 1897, dressed in traditional Algerian clothing, was an important news story in several French-language magazines of early 1897, including the Belgian magazine Le Globe Illustré, where Victor T'Sas, A.K.A. Vias, drew a picture story about Grenier's visit.
