= Frasne =

- Commune
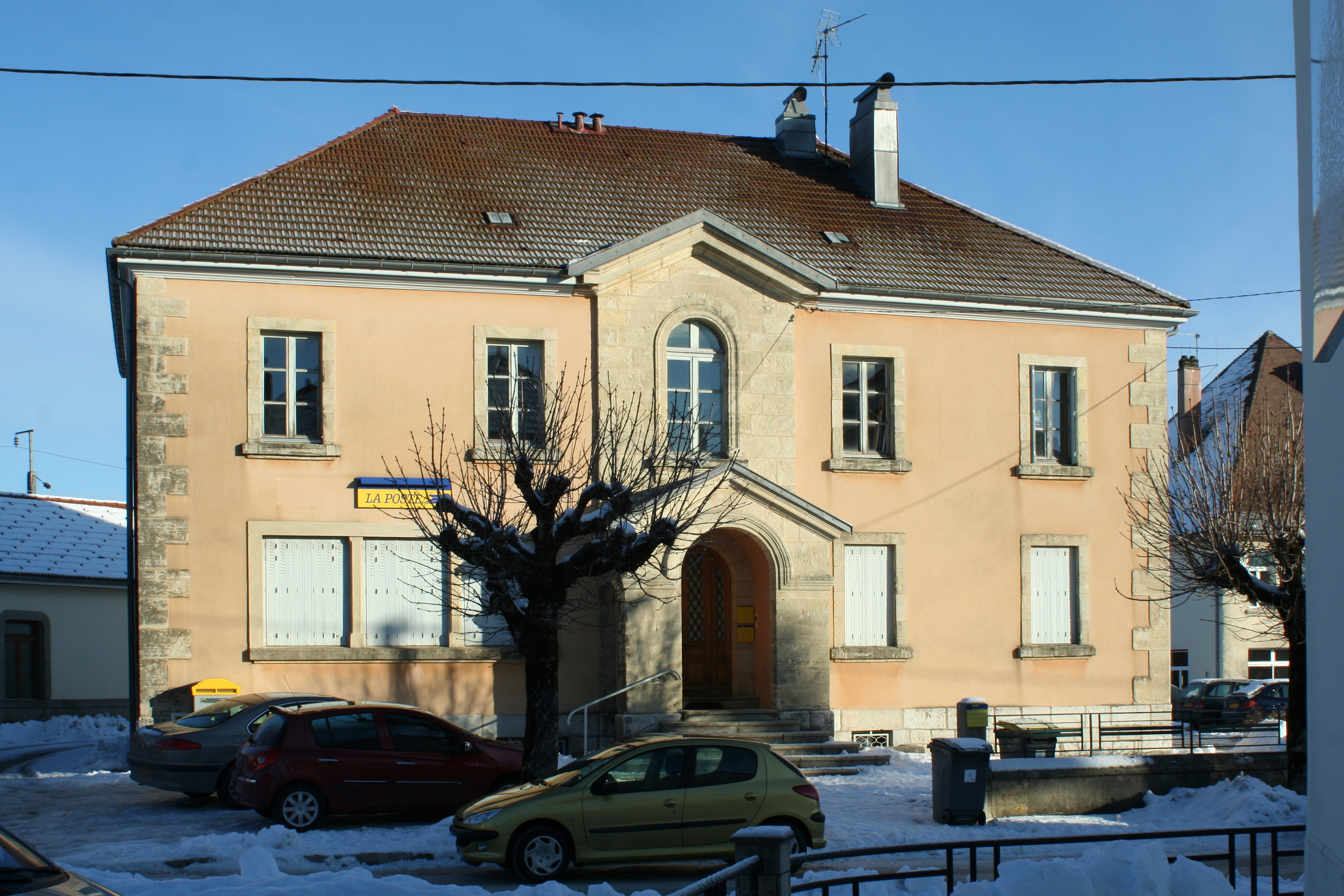
- Post office

- Coat of arms
- Location of Frasne
- Location within France Location within Bourgogne-Franche-Comté
- Coordinates: 46°51′23″N 6°09′37″E
- Country: France
- Region: Bourgogne-Franche-Comté
- Department: Doubs
- Arrondissement: Pontarlier
- Canton: Frasne
- Intercommunality: Plateau de Frasne et Val du Drugeon

Government
  - Mayor (2020–2026): Philippe Alpy
- Area^{1}: 32.87 km^{2} (12.69 sq mi)
- Highest elevation: 882 m (2,894 ft)
- Lowest elevation: 810 m (2,660 ft)
- Population (2023): 1,975
  - Density: 60.09/km^{2} (155.6/sq mi)
- Time zone: UTC+01:00 (CET)
  - Summer (DST): UTC+02:00 (CEST)
- INSEE/Postal code: 25259 /25560
- ^{1} French Land Register data, which excludes lakes, ponds, glaciers > 1 km^{2} (0.386 sq mi or 247 acres) and river estuaries.

Frasne (French pronunciation: [fʁan]; Arpitan: Fraînou) is a commune in the Doubs department in the Bourgogne-Franche-Comté region in eastern France.

The local railway station, Gare de Frasne, was opened on 10 June 1855.

== Population ==
Historical population
Year	Pop.	±% p.a.
1968	1,353	—
1975	1,430	+0.79%
1982	1,355	−0.77%
1990	1,519	+1.44%
1999	1,624	+0.75%
2007	1,771	+1.09%
2012	1,876	+1.16%
2017	1,936	+0.63%
2023	1,975	+0.33%
Source: INSEE

== See also ==
- Communes of the Doubs department
