= Lac de Saint-Point =

Lake in Doubs, Bourgogne-Franche-Comté, France

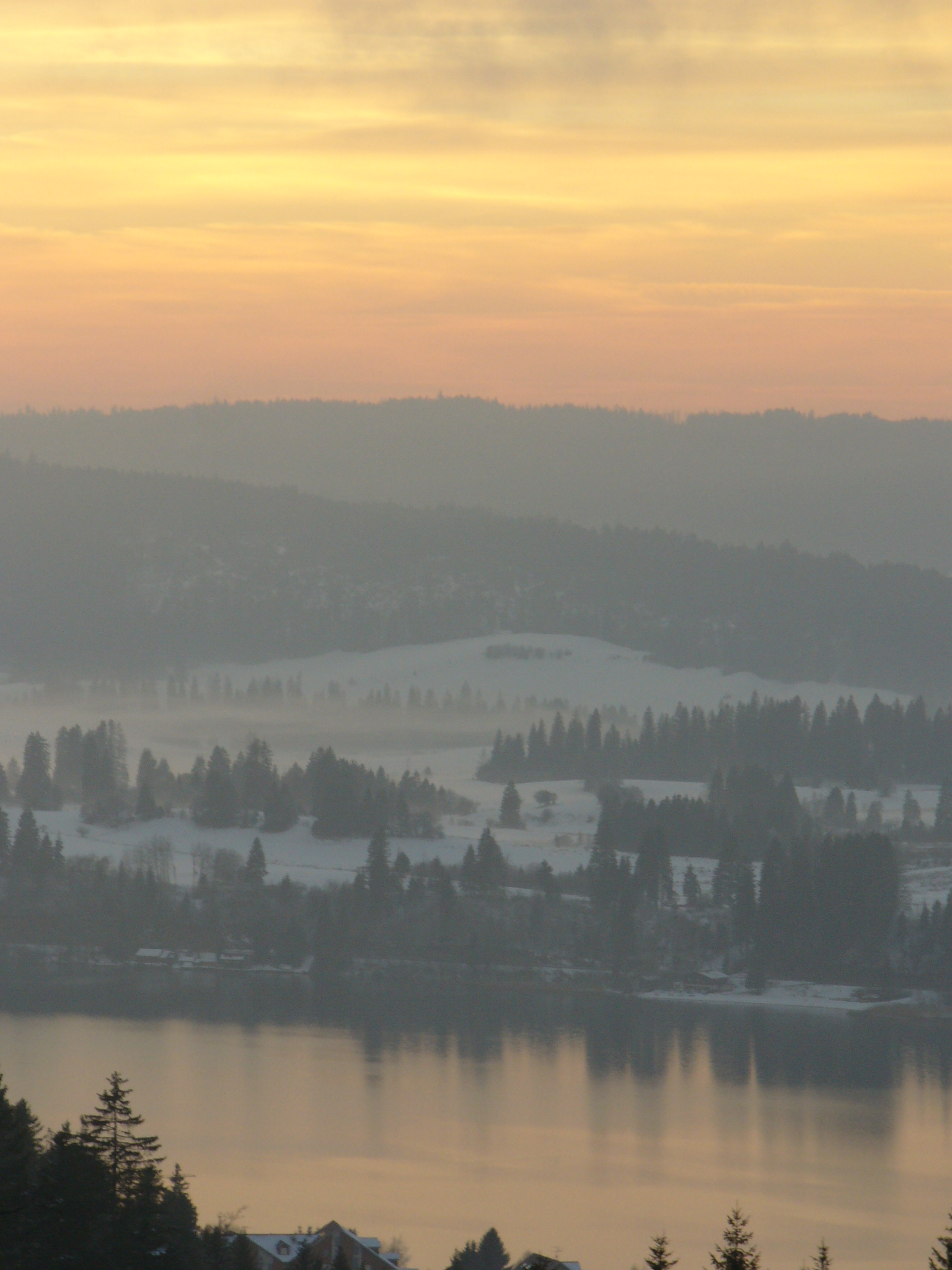

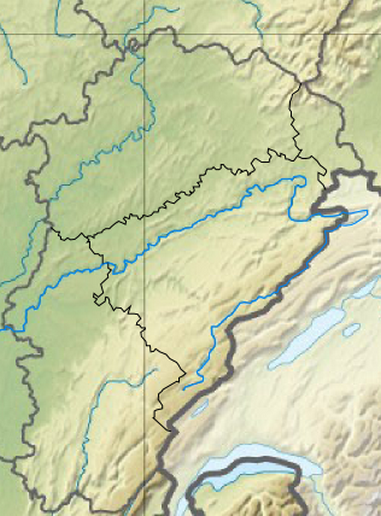
- Location within Franche-Comté
- Location: Doubs department, Franche-Comté
- Coordinates: 46°48′55″N 6°18′50″E
- Lake type: Natural, Glacial
- Primary inflows: Doubs
- Primary outflows: Doubs
- Basin countries: France
- Max. length: 7.2 km (4.5 mi)
- Max. width: 800 m (2,600 ft)
- Surface area: 5.2 km^{2} (2.0 sq mi)
- Max. depth: 43 m (141 ft)
- Water volume: 81.6×10^{6} m^{3} (2.88×10^{9} cu ft)
- Residence time: 200 days
- Surface elevation: 850 m (2,790 ft)

Lac de Saint-Point (French pronunciation: [lak də sɛ̃ pwɛ̃]; also Lac de Malbuisson) is a lake formed by the river Doubs near Pontarlier in the Doubs department of France. With a surface area of 5.2 km^{2}, it is one of the largest natural lakes of France.

== See also ==
- www.malbuisson.fr - Official website of Malbuisson - For general information and tourism
- Saint-Point-Lac
