= Robert Fernier =

French painter

- Born: 26 July 1895; Pontarlier, France
- Died: 27 May 1977 (aged 81); Goux-les-Usiers, France
- Occupation: Painter

Robert Fernier (26 July 1895 – 27 May 1977) was a French painter. His work was part of the painting event in the art competition at the 1932 Summer Olympics.
