= Jean-Jacques Fernier =

French architect and historian (1931–2020)

- Born: 25 May 1931
- Died: 25 March 2020 (aged 88); Paris, France
- Occupations: Architect; Historian

Jean-Jacques Fernier (25 May 1931 – 25 March 2020) was a French architect and historian.

== Biography ==
Fernier was a registered architect. He graduated from the École nationale supérieure des beaux-arts in Paris in 1961. From 1959 to 1961, he worked for Edouard Albert. In 1961, he joined forces with André Biro to create the firm Biro & Fernier. In 1965, he participated in the Groupe international d'architecture prospective (GIAP) along with Michel Ragon, Yona Friedman, Paul Maymont, Georges Patrix, and Nicolas Schöffer. Biro and Fernier worked in the movement "Construction and Humanism". He received the Grand Prix de l'urbanisme for his project Ville en X.

He conducted most of his work with his partner, André Biro in the Biro & Fernier firm. Fernier built numerous public and private works in Paris, Papeete, and elsewhere in French Polynesia. When Biro left in 1985, Fernier created Fernier & Associates, which he passed on to his daughter, Laurence.

Jean-Jacques was the son of painter Robert Fernier, who wrote a catalogue raisonné on the works of Gustave Courbet and founder of the Musée Courbet.

In 2001, Fernier worked with the "Association des amis de Gustave Courbet" and the "Institut Gustave Courbet - Association des amis de Gustave Courbet et du musée". The Institut is now chaired by Hervé Novelli.

On 7 February 2013, the Fernier obtained an expanded version of L'Origine du monde by Courbet, which was larger than the originally published version. An anonymous Parisian collector purchased the work in 2010. However, the curators of the Musée d'Orsay rejected the work, calling it "fanciful". Therefore, Fernier was the only expert to own both the known painting and the original work. There was a newfound controversy over the rightful owner of the original painting.

Jean-Jacques Fernier died on 25 March 2020 at the age of 88.
