= Pontarlier station =

Railway station in Pontarlier, France

Pontarlier
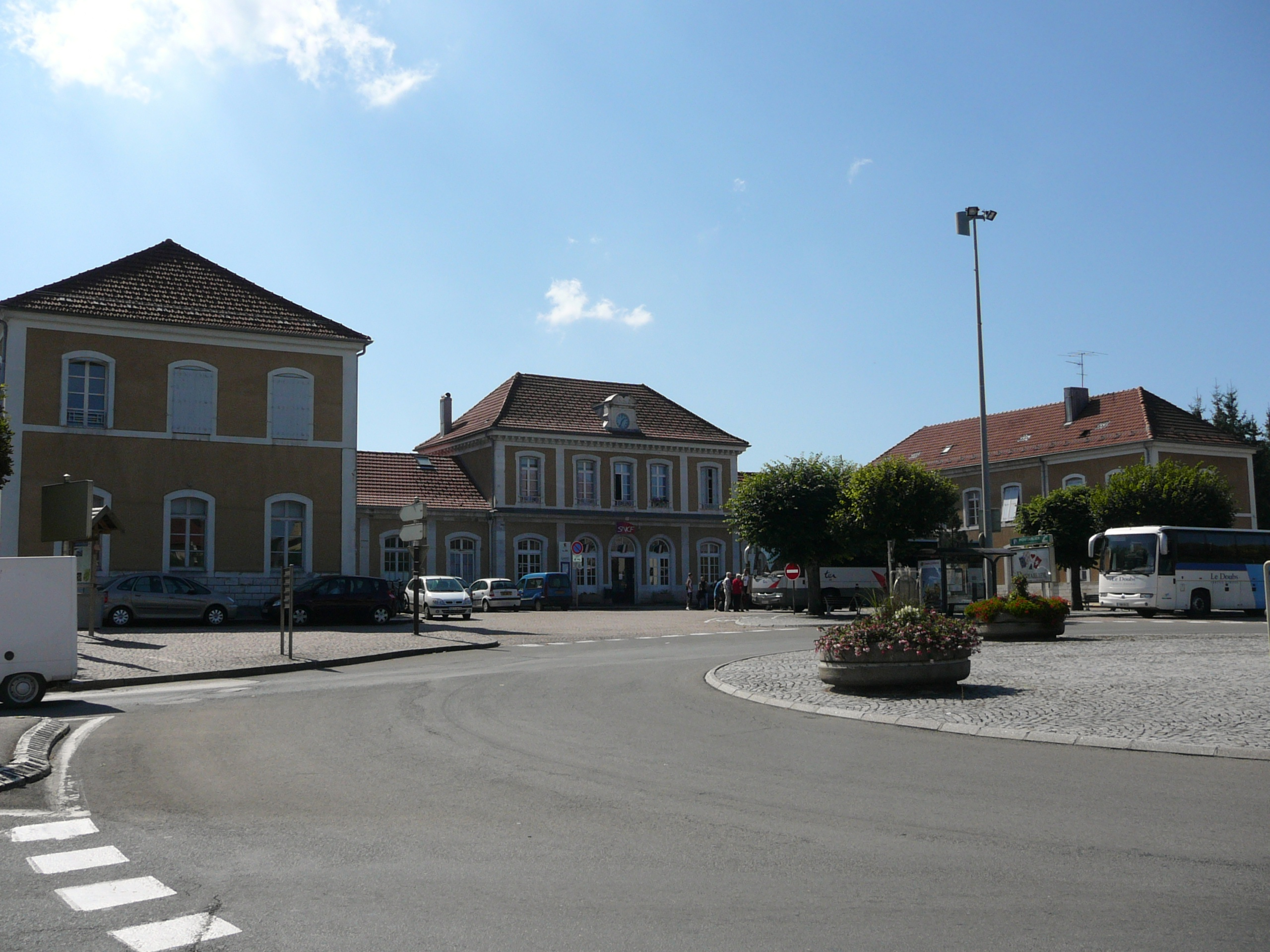
- The station building in 2007

General information
- Location: Pontarlier; France
- Coordinates: 46°54′03″N 6°21′13″E
- Owner: SNCF
- Lines: Frasne–Les Verrières line; Neuchâtel–Pontarlier line
- Distance: 453.0 km (281.5 mi) from Paris-Lyon
- Train operators: SNCF; Swiss Federal Railways
- Connections: Transports publics Neuchâtelois buses

Other information
- Station code: 87715003

Passengers
- 2018: 175,873

Services
Preceding station	TER Bourgogne-Franche-Comté	Following station
Frasne towards Vallorbe	TER	Terminus
Sainte-Colombe towards Dole	TER	Terminus
Preceding station	SBB CFF FFS	Following station
Frasne Terminus	RE9	Travers towards Neuchâtel
Location

Pontarlier station (French: Gare de Pontarlier) is a railway station in the commune of Pontarlier, in the French department of Doubs, in the Bourgogne-Franche-Comté region. It is located at the border between France and Switzerland, at the junction of Frasne–Les Verrières line of SNCF and the Neuchâtel–Pontarlier line of Swiss Federal Railways.

== Services ==
The following services stop at Pontarlier:

- TER Bourgogne-Franche-Comté: regional service to Dole-Ville and Vallorbe.
- RegioExpress: three trains per day between Neuchâtel and Frasne, connecting with the Paris–Lausanne TGV Lyria service.
