= Pontarlier =

Pontarlier Pontarliér (Arpitan)
- Subprefecture and commune
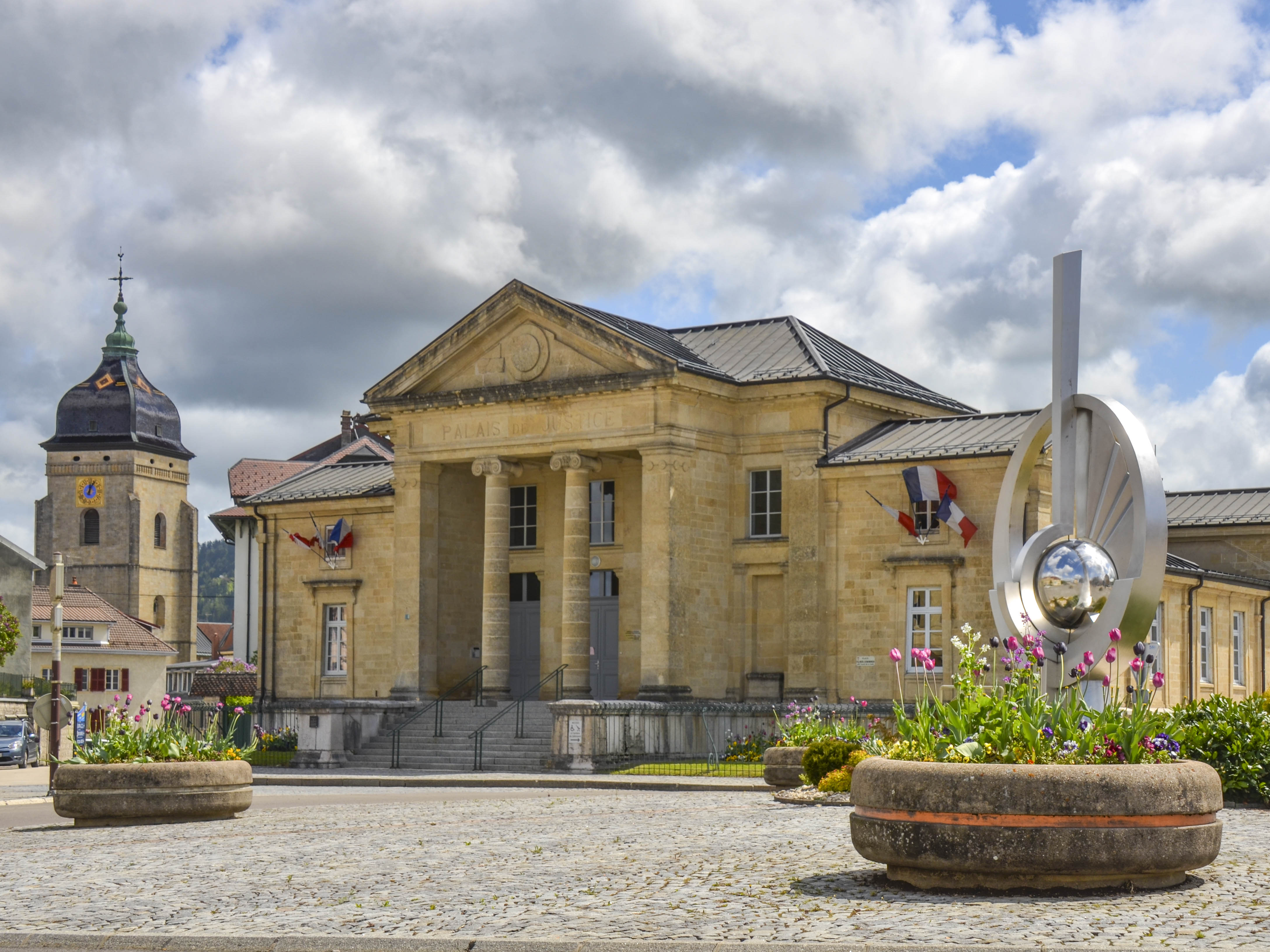
- Saint-Bénigne Church and the Palace of Justice

- Coat of arms
- Location of Pontarlier
- Location within France Location within Bourgogne-Franche-Comté
- Coordinates: 46°54′24″N 6°21′20″E
- Country: France
- Region: Bourgogne-Franche-Comté
- Department: Doubs
- Arrondissement: Pontarlier
- Canton: Pontarlier
- Intercommunality: CC du Grand Pontarlier

Government
  - Mayor (2020–2026): Patrick Genre (DVD)
- Area^{1}: 41.35 km^{2} (15.97 sq mi)
- Elevation: 837 m (2,746 ft)
- Highest elevation: 1,320 m (4,330 ft)
- Lowest elevation: 811 m (2,661 ft)
- Population (2023): 18,067
  - Density: 436.9/km^{2} (1,132/sq mi)
- Demonym: Pontissaliens
- Time zone: UTC+01:00 (CET)
  - Summer (DST): UTC+02:00 (CEST)
- INSEE/Postal code: 25462 /25300
- Website: www.ville-pontarlier.fr
- ^{1} French Land Register data, which excludes lakes, ponds, glaciers > 1 km^{2} (0.386 sq mi or 247 acres) and river estuaries.

Pontarlier (French: [pɔ̃taʁlje]; Latin: Ariolica; Arpitan: Pontarliér) is a commune and one of the two subprefectures of the Doubs department in the Bourgogne-Franche-Comté region in eastern France.

Nestled in the heart of the Jura Mountains near the Swiss border, the town lies along the Doubs River and occupies the Arlier plain at approximately 830–837 m elevation. It is overshadowed by the Grand Taureau peak, which reaches 1,323 m.

Pontarlier occupies a site that has been inhabited since Neolithic times. Known as Ariolica in antiquity, it was an important transit point between Gaul and Italy. During the Middle Ages, it flourished as a trading hub on the route linking the Mediterranean and the North Sea. The city endured significant turmoil—most notably during the Thirty Years' War, when it was besieged and largely destroyed in 1639 by troops under Bernard of Saxe‑Weimar, and suffered multiple destructive fires in the 17th and 18th centuries.

At the start of the 19th century, Pontarlier became known as France's "absinthe capital" when Henri‑Louis Pernod established the Pernod Fils distillery in 1805. By the early 20th century, around twenty distilleries employed nearly 3,000 people, thanks to booming national demand. That era abruptly ended with the French ban on absinthe in 1915. The modern revival of absinthe since 2001 has reconnected Pontarlier with this storied past. Pontarlier is also associated with a type of historical absinthe glass known as the Pontarlier glass. The reservoir-style glass takes its modern name from its appearance in a widely distributed advertising chromolithograph for Pernod Fils, based on a work by Pontarlier artist Charles Maire (1845–1919). The still life depicts a bottle of Pernod Fils absinthe, a water carafe and absinthe glasses, with a copy of the local Journal de Pontarlier in the foreground.

Today, Pontarlier is the leading economic and commercial hub of the Haut‑Doubs area. Its diversified industrial sector includes major employers such as Schrader (Valves), Nestlé France (producing Nesquik powder locally), and Hifi Filter France (specializing in filtration). The town has over 400 retail outlets, spread across multiple commercial zones, drawing shoppers from France and neighboring Switzerland. Pontarlier also supports regional food and beverage traditions. The Badoz dairy produces Comté and Mont d’Or cheeses, while distilleries like Pierre Guy continue crafting traditional absinthe, Pontarlier aperitif (anise-flavored), and other regional liqueurs.

Pontarlier has a rich architectural and cultural heritage. The Church of Saint‑Bénigne, reconstructed between 1651 and 1666 in the Romanesque‑Gothic style typical of Franche‑Comté, features an imperial‑dome bell tower and stained‑glass windows by Alfred Manessier, and is officially listed as a historic monument. The classical triumphal arch of the Porte Saint‑Pierre, erected from 1771 to 1773 to commemorate the town's reconstruction, stands as another major symbol of the city. The Municipal Museum of Art and History, housed in a 15th‑century manor, showcases archaeological treasures, regional artifacts, decorative arts, and items connected to absinthe.

== History ==
Pontarlier occupies the ancient Roman station of Ariolica, in Gallia and is placed in the Tables on the road from Urba (modern Orbe, Canton Vaud, Switzerland), to Vesontio (modern Besançon). Although the distances in the Antonine Itinerary do not agree with the real distances, French geographer D'Anville recognized a transposition of the numbers. The Theodosian Tabula names the place "Abrolica", which William Smith states as a possible error of transcription.

After the Burgundian invasion in the 5th century, Pontarlier became the best route for trade from the kingdom of Burgundy to Switzerland, Germany or Lombardy. Until the 17th century it was the easiest way to cross the Jura Mountains.

Pontarlier is one of the staging posts from northern France, Britain and the Benelux countries for the Via Francigena, now a walking route to Rome with a starting point in Canterbury, England. It is recorded as being the stop on day 57 of Sigeric the Serious, the then Archbishop of Canterbury on his return from Rome in 990 AD, having been given his pallium, or token of rank. Discussion continues as to whether he came over the Jura from the direction of Yverdon-les-Bains to the south-east or through a valley from Jougne to the south.

The city of Pontarlier is briefly mentioned in Victor Hugo's Les Misérables. It was to this city that convict Jean Valjean was to report for his parole after being released from the galleys. Breaking these instructions is a major turning point in the novel, and also creates some major conflict for Valjean later in the story. The city is also the main location of the 1962 French film The Seventh Juror.

Pontarlier was famous for the production of absinthe until its ban in 1915. The distilleries switched over to producing a particular type of pastis, the "Pontarlier". With the ban partially lifted in the 1990s, Pontarlier distilleries are once again producing absinthe.

== Population ==
Its inhabitants are known as Pontissaliens and Pontissaliennes in French.

Historical population

Year	Pop.	±% p.a.
1793	3,348	—
1800	3,771	+1.71%
1806	3,526	−1.11%
1821	4,254	+1.26%
1831	4,707	+1.02%
1836	4,922	+0.90%
1841	4,965	+0.17%
1846	5,136	+0.68%
1851	4,953	−0.72%
1856	4,909	−0.18%
1861	5,007	+0.40%
1866	4,945	−0.25%
1872	4,975	+0.10%
1876	5,714	+3.52%
1881	6,118	+1.38%
1886	8,098	+5.77%
1891	7,187	−2.36%
1896	7,577	+1.06%
1901	7,963	+1.00%

Year	Pop.	±% p.a.
1906	8,776	+1.96%
1911	9,439	+1.47%
1921	10,203	+0.78%
1926	11,827	+3.00%
1931	11,984	+0.26%
1936	12,840	+1.39%
1946	12,722	−0.09%
1954	13,768	+0.99%
1962	15,382	+1.40%
1968	16,442	+1.12%
1975	17,983	+1.29%
1982	17,781	−0.16%
1990	18,104	+0.23%
1999	18,360	+0.16%
2007	18,939	+0.39%
2012	17,631	−1.42%
2017	17,197	−0.50%
2023	18,067	+0.83%

Source: EHESS and INSEE (1968–2023)

== Transportation ==
The commune has a railway station, Pontarlier, on the Frasne–Les Verrières and Neuchâtel–Pontarlier lines between France and Switzerland. Pontarlier Airfield, is an aerodrome 5 km (3 mi) west of the commune. The nearest airports to Pontarlier are Geneva Airport, located 115 km (71 mi) south and EuroAirport Basel-Mulhouse-Freiburg, located 183 km (114 mi) north east.

== Notable people ==
- Sébastien Rale (1652–1724), missionary and lexicographer
- Charles Antoine Morand (1771–1835), Napoleonic general
- Henri-Louis Pernod, distiller
- Edgar Faure, member of the Académie française, president of the city council, and mayor
- Philippe Grenier (1865–1944), physician and first Muslim member of French parliament
- Xavier Marmier (1808–1892), writer and poet
- Robert Fernier (1895–1977), painter
- Pierre Bichet (1922–2008), painter
- Vincent Defrasne (born 1977), biathlete
- Florence Baverel-Robert (born 1974), biathlete

== Sights ==
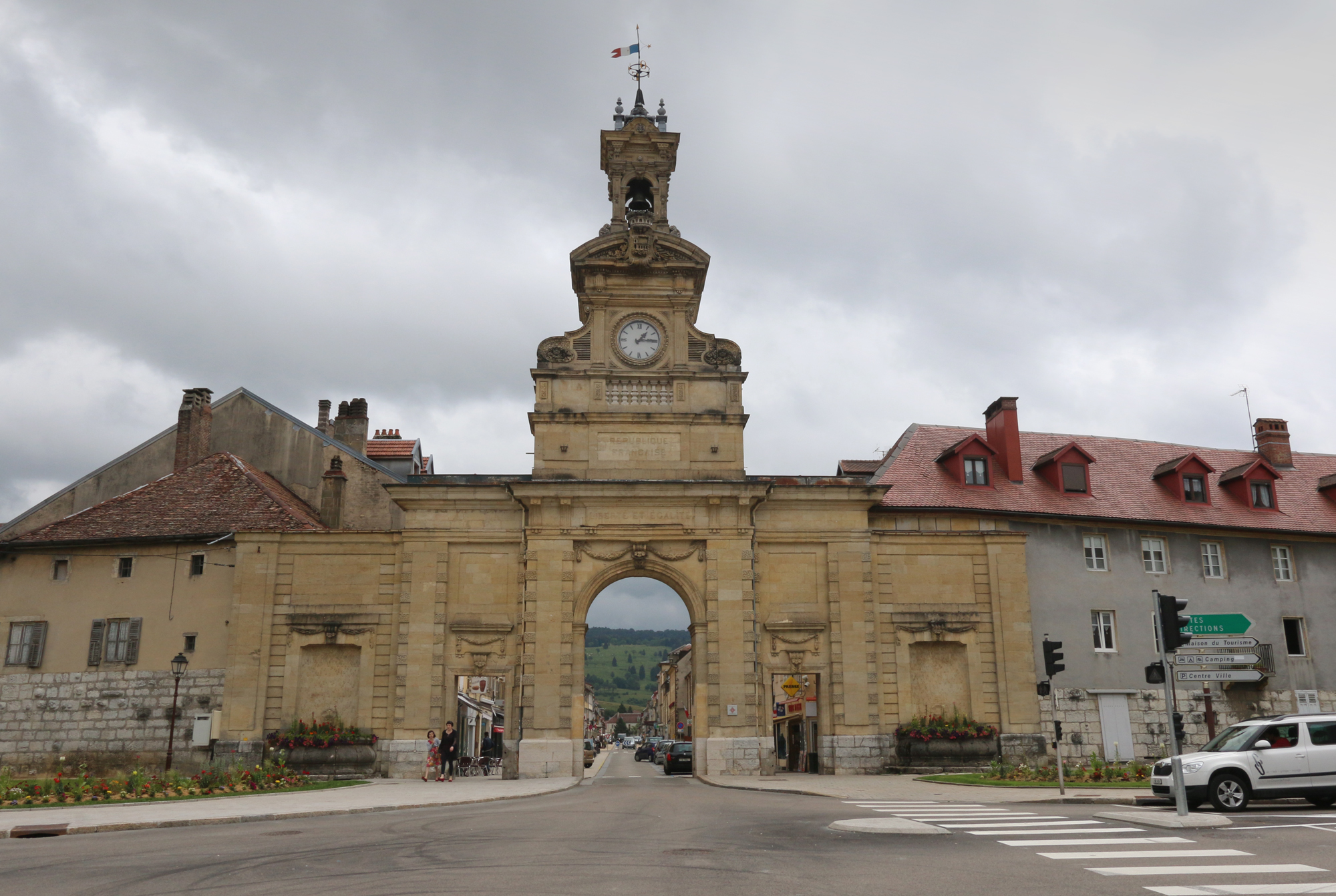
Triumphal arch of the Porte Saint-Pierre

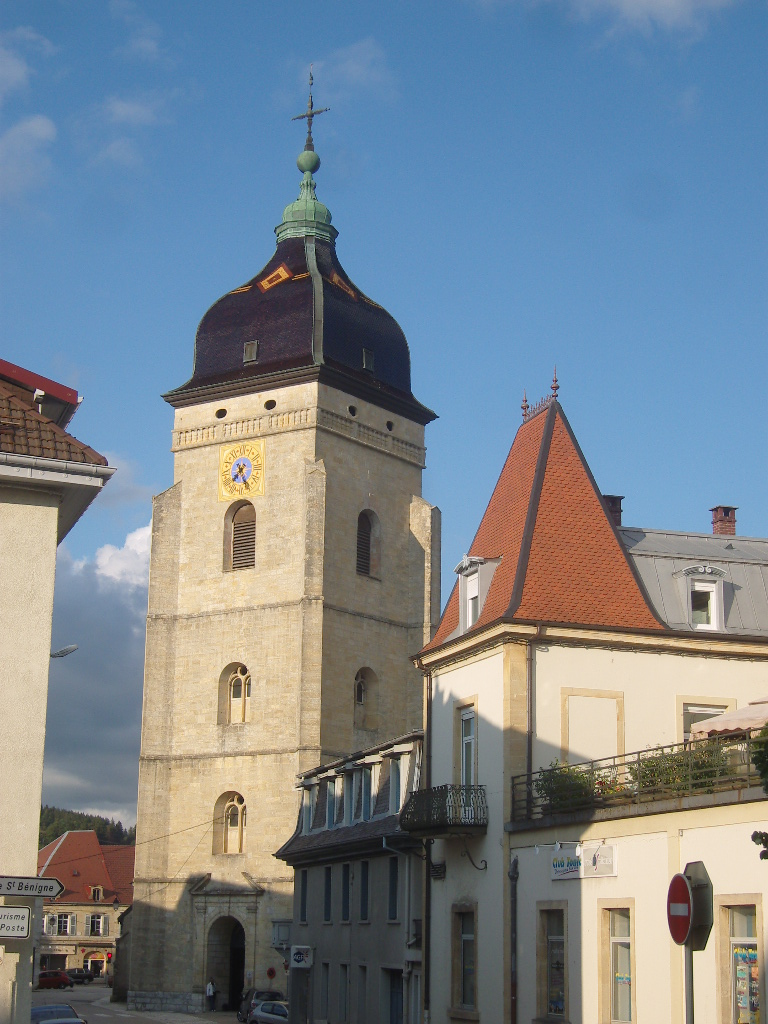
Church of Saint-Bénigne

- Triumphal arch of the Porte Saint-Pierre (18th century)
- Stained glass created in 1976 by painter Alfred Manessier in the Church of Saint-Bénigne, a 17th-century church that blends Romanesque, Gothic, and Franc-Comtois architectural styles. Originally built in the 11th century, it was largely rebuilt between 1651 and 1666 after being damaged during the Thirty Years' War. The church features a distinctive bell tower topped with an imperial dome, typical of the region. It remains an active place of worship and a historical monument.
- Fort de Joux (between 11th and 19th century)

== International relations ==
Pontarlier is twinned with:

- Yverdon-les-Bains, Switzerland
- Villingen-Schwenningen, Germany
- Zarautz, Spain

== Climate ==
Climate data for Pontarlier (1991–2020 normals, extremes 1897–present)
Month	Jan	Feb	Mar	Apr	May	Jun	Jul	Aug	Sep	Oct	Nov	Dec	Year
Record high °C (°F)	20.1 (68.2)	21.5 (70.7)	24.9 (76.8)	27.0 (80.6)	33.0 (91.4)	35.0 (95.0)	38.0 (100.4)	37.0 (98.6)	32.8 (91.0)	29.4 (84.9)	23.5 (74.3)	20.3 (68.5)	38.0 (100.4)
Mean daily maximum °C (°F)	4.6 (40.3)	5.7 (42.3)	9.8 (49.6)	13.6 (56.5)	17.3 (63.1)	21.2 (70.2)	23.5 (74.3)	23.5 (74.3)	19.1 (66.4)	15.0 (59.0)	8.8 (47.8)	5.1 (41.2)	13.9 (57.0)
Daily mean °C (°F)	0.5 (32.9)	1.0 (33.8)	4.6 (40.3)	7.9 (46.2)	11.8 (53.2)	15.4 (59.7)	17.5 (63.5)	17.3 (63.1)	13.4 (56.1)	9.8 (49.6)	4.6 (40.3)	1.3 (34.3)	8.8 (47.8)
Mean daily minimum °C (°F)	−3.6 (25.5)	−3.7 (25.3)	−0.6 (30.9)	2.2 (36.0)	6.2 (43.2)	9.7 (49.5)	11.4 (52.5)	11.1 (52.0)	7.7 (45.9)	4.6 (40.3)	0.3 (32.5)	−2.5 (27.5)	3.6 (38.5)
Record low °C (°F)	−32.0 (−25.6)	−26.2 (−15.2)	−21.7 (−7.1)	−10.8 (12.6)	−6.0 (21.2)	−2.0 (28.4)	0.8 (33.4)	0.1 (32.2)	−3.3 (26.1)	−9.7 (14.5)	−16.4 (2.5)	−23.2 (−9.8)	−32.0 (−25.6)
Average precipitation mm (inches)	115.3 (4.54)	105.4 (4.15)	107.5 (4.23)	105.0 (4.13)	139.9 (5.51)	124.5 (4.90)	123.1 (4.85)	121.3 (4.78)	113.6 (4.47)	128.9 (5.07)	131.4 (5.17)	147.7 (5.81)	1,463.6 (57.62)
Average precipitation days (≥ 1.0 mm)	12.9	11.8	11.9	12.2	14.9	12.3	12.1	11.1	10.7	13.0	12.8	14.0	149.7
Source: Meteociel

== See also ==
- Communes of the Doubs department
- Défilé d'Entre-Roches
