= Frasne–Les Verrières railway =

Railway line in France

Frasne–Les Verrières
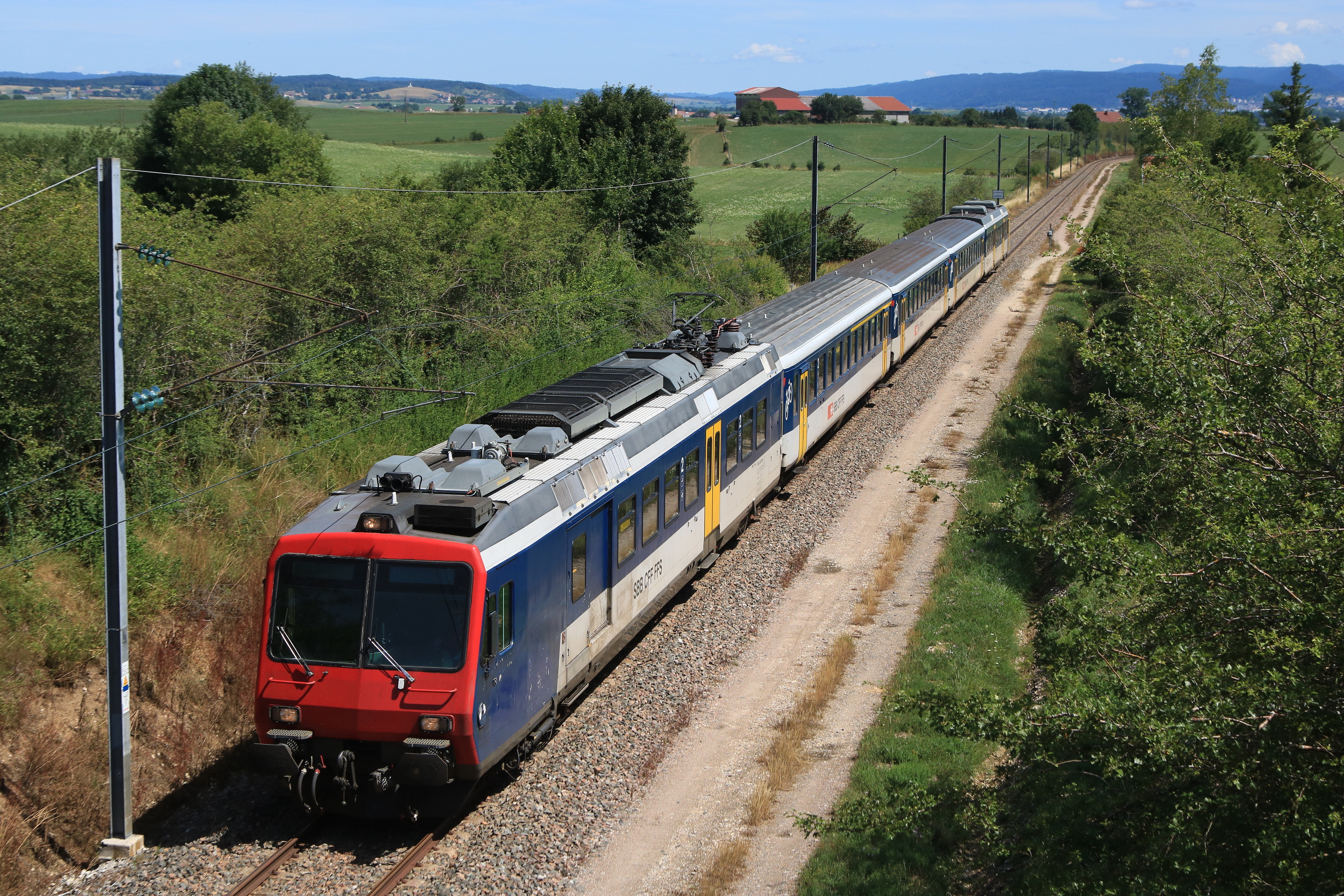
- An SBB RegioExpress between Frasne and La Rivière in 2019

Overview
- Owner: SNCF
- Termini: Frasne; Verrières-de-Joux
- Stations: 4

Service
- Route number: 875 (SNCF)

Technical
- Line length: 27.6 km (17.1 mi)
- Track gauge: 1,435 mm (4 ft 8 1/2 in) standard gauge
- Electrification: 25 kV 50 Hz (Frasne–Pontarlier); 15 kV 16.7 Hz (Pontarlier–Verrières-de-Joux)

The Frasne–Les Verrières railway is a railway line in the Franche-Comté region of France. It runs 27.6 kilometres (17.1 mi) from the Franco–Swiss border at Verrières-de-Joux to Frasne. It was built between 1860 and 1862 by the Chemins de fer de Paris à Lyon et à la Méditerranée and is now owned by SNCF.

== Services ==
TER Bourgogne-Franche-Comté operates Transport express régional trains between Pontarlier, Dole-Ville, and Vallorbe. Swiss Federal Railways runs several RegioExpress trains between Neuchâtel (in Switzerland) and Frasne, where they connect with high-speed TGV Lyria services.
