= Republic of Saugeais =

Micronation

- Micronation (unrecognized entity)
- Flag of the Republic of Saugeais

- Map of the Republic of Saugeais
- Location: 11 municipalities in the départment of Doubs, France
- Area claimed: 128 km^{2} (49 sq mi)
- Currency: Euro; Saugeais Sol (commemorative)
- Claimed by: Georges Pourchet
- Dates claimed: 1947–present

The Republic of Saugeais (French: La République du Saugeais, pronounced [so.ʒɛ]; Arpitan: Rèpublica libra dou Sâget) is a self-proclaimed micronation located in eastern France, in the département of Doubs. The republic comprises the 11 municipalities of Les Alliés, Arçon, Bugny, La Chaux-de-Gilley, Gilley, Hauterive-la-Fresse, La Longeville, Montflovin, Maisons-du-Bois-Lièvremont, Ville-du-Pont, and its capital Montbenoît.

== History ==
=== Origins ===
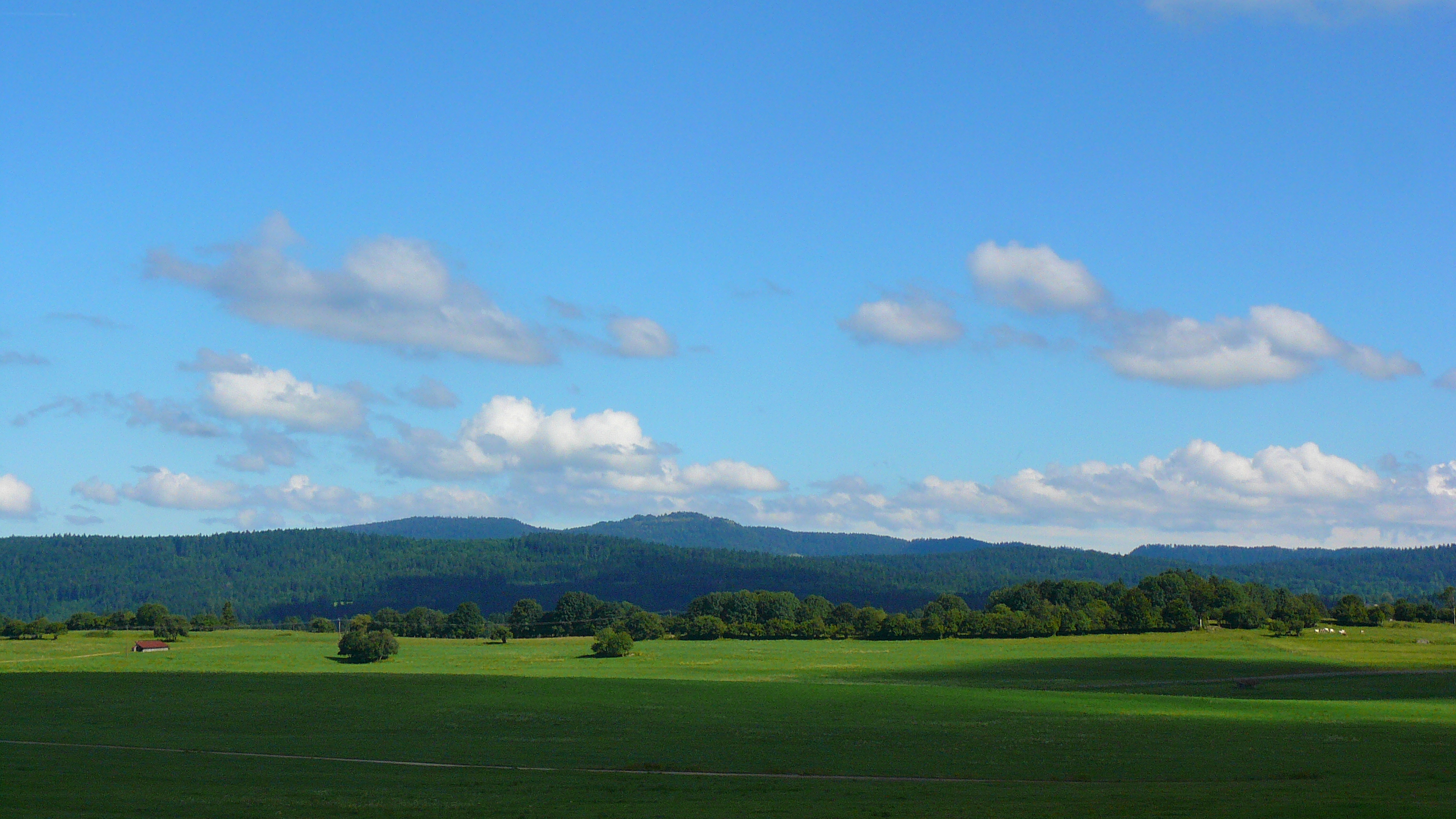
Summer landscape of Saugeais.

Around the year 1000, the Saugeais Valley was a wild and deserted country like a large part of the Jura mountains. A hermit named Benedict is said to have settled there in the 11th century. Subsequently, the sire of Joux gave this territory to canons regular of Saint-Augustin from Saint-Maurice-en-Valais, living under the rule of Saint Augustine, and dependent on Saint-Maurice d'Agaune. The first prior mentioned in Narduin's texts in 1130. The limits of the territory are fixed in the charter of Henri de Joux in 1228. The Coutumier du Val du Saugeais in 1458 lists the laws and rules in force in the territory. The abbey was built in several stages. In order to redeem mistakes, Landry, lord of Joux, donated this uncultivated land covered with forests to Humbert de Scey, an archbishop of Besançon. The latter called on the canons of the Abbey of Saint-Maurice d'Agaune, as well as to Savoyards to clear it and build the abbey of Montbenoît.

Organized by a hermit named Benedict, who had come to retire since the end of the previous century to "a solitude in the snows and among the bears", the religious community of the abbey exercised seigniorial power over this land until the Revolution and contributes greatly to the development of this portion of the Doubs Valley. Of diverse origins, the settlers bring with them their dialect and their traditions. As for the abbey, it is today the only medieval religious ensemble thus preserved in the department of Doubs. The cloister dates from the 12th 15th century. The church has twenty-six carved wooden stalls, particularly expressive (heads, figures) as well as an old vaulted kitchen with oven. Other migratory traces on this land date back to 1348 and 1349, at the time of the great black plague, including the arrival of a Chaboz (Chabod) at the farm of “Chez la graine”, who after a myth taken up in the anthem, will give birth to a whole line of Saugeais (Chabod, Bole-Richard, Bolle-Reddat, etc.) Speak Sauget, whose use was still common around 1900 but which has since been lost with only a few people knowing bits of it, differs from other local patois; its roots lie with the first settlers from the canton of Grisons and the Savoyards who accompanied the canons regular of Saint-Augustin.

=== The Republic ===
Map of the Republic of Saugeais

In 1947, the prefect of the Doubs, Louis Ottaviani, passing through Montbenoît, had lunch at the Hôtel de l'Abbaye, whose boss was Georges Pourchet. When the prefect entered the hotel, the owner jokingly asked him if he has a pass to come to the Republic of Saugeais. Surprised, the prefect asked him: "Mr. Pourchet, explain this to me." After the explanations, the prefect also joked to him: "A republic needs a president. Well, I appoint you President of the Free Republic of Saugeais. Georges Pourchet then decided to take charge of this title.

Martial Jeantet, parish priest of Montbenoît from 1964 to 1982, also participated in reactivating the folklore of this community. Indeed, this architecture enthusiast found the necessary funds to renovate the abbey. The dynamic initiated by these works saw the reappearance of an increasingly important regional folk current.

After the death of Georges Pourchet in 1968, the Republic remained without a president for four years. In 1972, after his widow Gabrielle Pourchet organized a dinner for the benefit of the restoration of the abbey, she was elected president for life. She then tried to structure the Republic by appointing ambassadors, minting coins and creating a passport.

There is a Hymn of the Saugeais, composed in 1910 to music by Théodore Botrel, the Breton bard, by Canon Joseph Bobillier, born in Montbenoît. In addition, a French stamp of 2,50 francs, including the symbols of Saugeais (medieval coat of arms, Montbenoît abbey, river), was published in 1987.

President Gabrielle Pourchet appointed a prime minister, a general secretary, twelve ambassadors and more than 300 honorary citizens. A song written in the Langue Saugette, a Franco-Provençal dialect, by Joseph Botillon in 1910 was adopted as the republic's national anthem. A banknote was released in 1997, and the French Postal Service issued a postal stamp commemorating the republic in 1987.

In 1999, the sub-prefect of the district of Pontarlier, Jean-Luc Fabre, was stopped at a Saugeais customs checkpoint, and asked for his Saugeais laissez-passer, but he took offence to this and turned around rather than continue his journey. Following the incident, he decided that French state officials should stop attending official Saugeais events, suggesting that the folkloric side was starting to take a turn "incompatible with the principles that apply to those in positions of public authority". However, after the story was run by the French newspaper Le Canard enchaîné he apologised - before being transferred to Corsica.

In 2006, to succeed her mother who had died the previous year, Georgette Bertin-Pourchet was elected by thirty grand electors "co-opted in proportion to the number of inhabitants" of the 11 communes. In 2022, in order to succeed Georgette Bertin-Porchet, of whom he was Prime Minister, Simon Marguet was elected president of the Republic of Saugeais. He is the first president not to come from the Pourchet family.

== List of presidents ==
1. Georges Pourchet (1947–68)
2. Gabrielle Pourchet (1968 – 31 August 2005)
3. Georgette Bertin-Pourchet (31 August 2005 – 18 March 2022)
4. Simon Marguet (18 March 2022 – present)
