= Maisons-du-Bois-Lièvremont =

- Commune
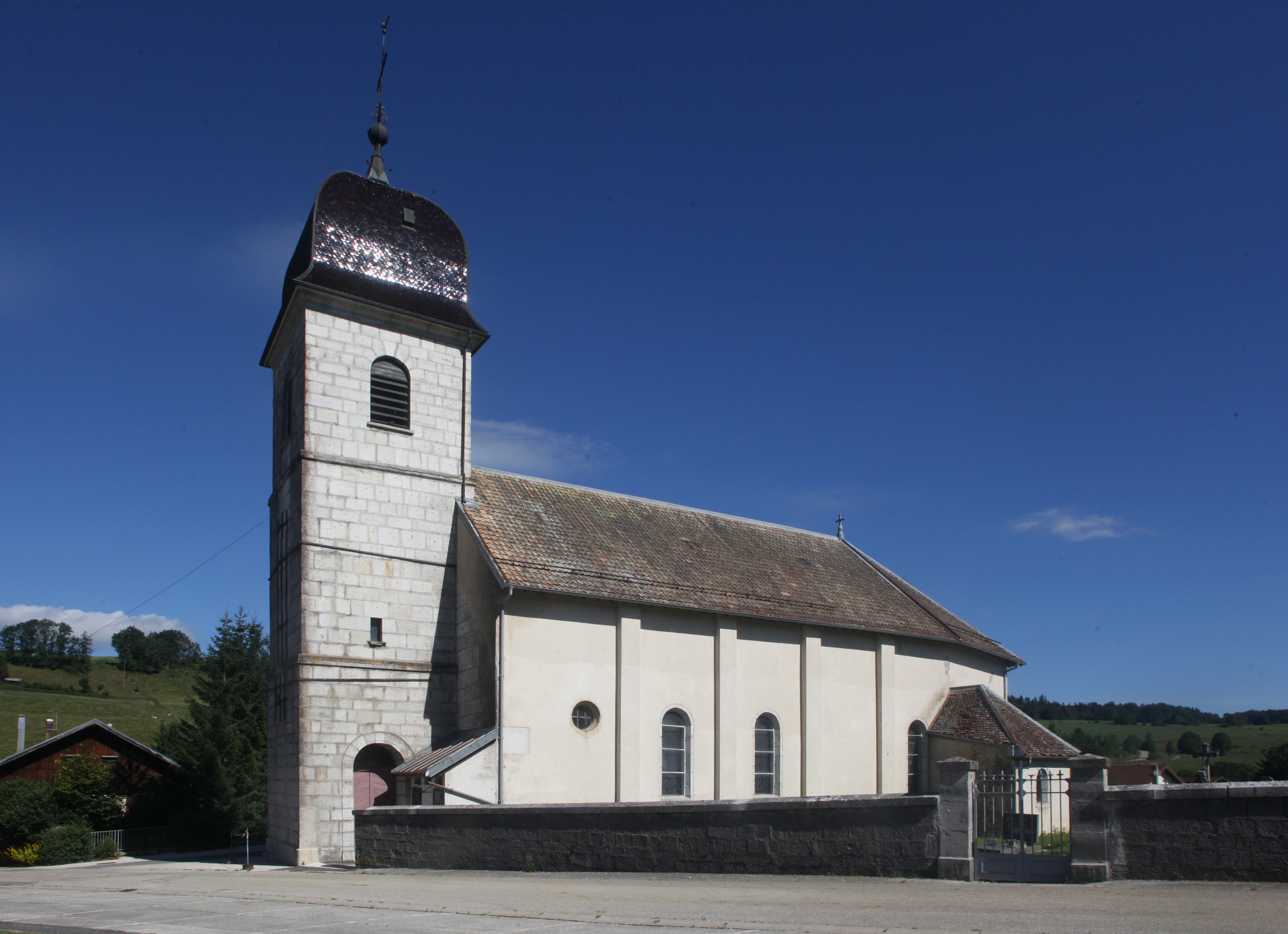
- The church in Lièvremont

- Coat of arms
- Location of Maisons-du-Bois-Lièvremont
- Location within France Location within Bourgogne-Franche-Comté
- Coordinates: 46°58′05″N 6°25′16″E
- Country: France
- Region: Bourgogne-Franche-Comté
- Department: Doubs
- Arrondissement: Pontarlier
- Canton: Ornans
- Intercommunality: CC entre Doubs et Loue

Government
  - Mayor (2020–2026): Francis Bourdin
- Area^{1}: 15.79 km^{2} (6.10 sq mi)
- Highest elevation: 1,073 m (3,520 ft)
- Lowest elevation: 780 m (2,560 ft)
- Population (2023): 835
  - Density: 52.9/km^{2} (137/sq mi)
- Time zone: UTC+01:00 (CET)
  - Summer (DST): UTC+02:00 (CEST)
- INSEE/Postal code: 25357 /25650
- ^{1} French Land Register data, which excludes lakes, ponds, glaciers > 1 km^{2} (0.386 sq mi or 247 acres) and river estuaries.

Maisons-du-Bois-Lièvremont (French pronunciation: [mɛzɔ̃ dy bwa ljɛvʁəmɔ̃]; Arpitan: Mèzon-du-Bô-Liramon) is a commune in the Doubs department in the Bourgogne-Franche-Comté region in eastern France.

== Geography ==
The commune is located 4 km (2.5 mi) from Montbenoît on both banks of the Doubs. The village stretches along the main street and spreads over the plateau 50 m above the Doubs valley.

== Population ==
Historical population
Year	Pop.	±% p.a.
1968	444	—
1975	424	−0.66%
1982	417	−0.24%
1990	461	+1.26%
1999	494	+0.77%
2007	588	+2.20%
2012	658	+2.28%
2017	807	+4.17%
2023	835	+0.57%
Source: INSEE

== See also ==
- Communes of the Doubs department
