= La Longeville =

- Part of Pays-de-Montbenoît
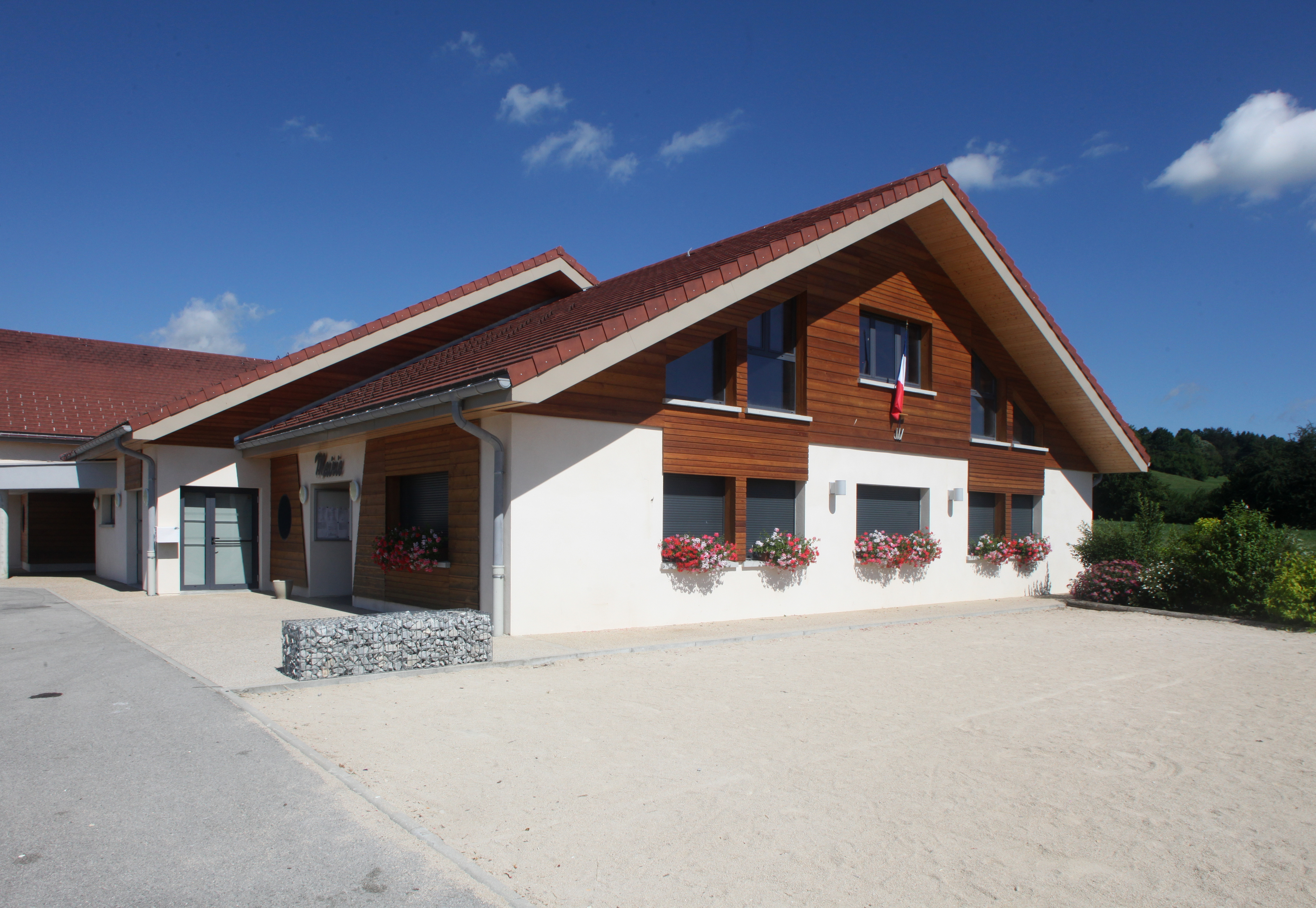
- The town hall in La Longeville
- Location of La Longeville
- Location within France Location within Bourgogne-Franche-Comté
- Coordinates: 47°00′30″N 6°27′29″E
- Country: France
- Region: Bourgogne-Franche-Comté
- Department: Doubs
- Arrondissement: Pontarlier
- Canton: Ornans
- Commune: Pays-de-Montbenoît
- Area^{1}: 15.66 km^{2} (6.05 sq mi)
- Highest elevation: 991 m (3,251 ft)
- Lowest elevation: 756 m (2,480 ft)
- Population (2023): 849
  - Density: 54.2/km^{2} (140/sq mi)
- Time zone: UTC+01:00 (CET)
  - Summer (DST): UTC+02:00 (CEST)
- Postal code: 25650
- ^{1} French Land Register data, which excludes lakes, ponds, glaciers > 1 km^{2} (0.386 sq mi or 247 acres) and river estuaries.

La Longeville (French pronunciation: [la lɔ̃ʒvil]; Arpitan: La Londjevla) is a former commune in the Doubs department in the Bourgogne-Franche-Comté region in eastern France. It was merged into the new commune Pays-de-Montbenoît on 1 January 2025.

== Geography ==
The former commune lies 5 km (3.1 mi) from Montbenoît, halfway between Pontarlier and Morteau in the Jura Mountains near the Swiss border.

== See also ==
- Communes of the Doubs department
