= Pays-de-Montbenoît =

- Commune
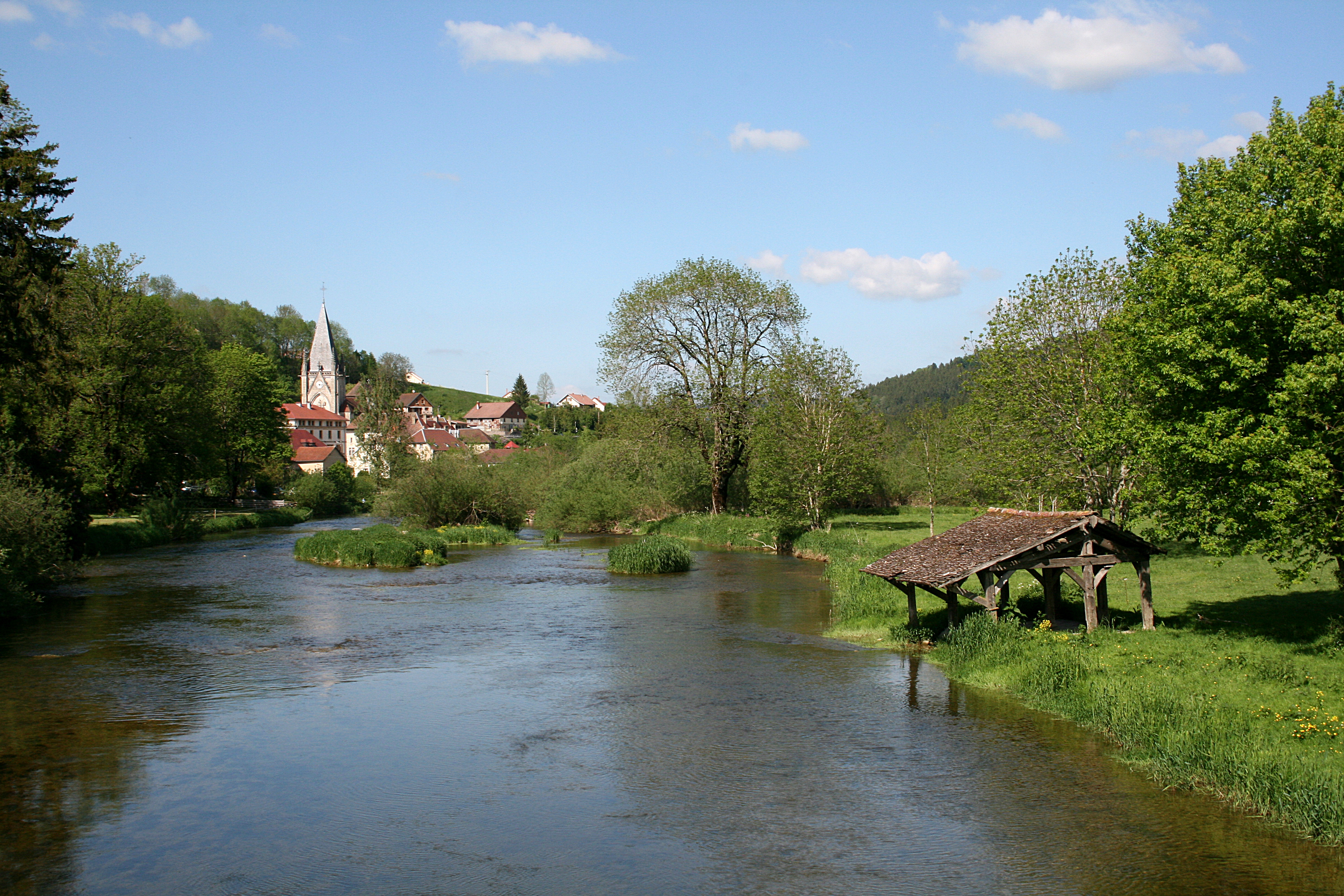
- The Doubs in Montbenoît
- Location of Pays-de-Montbenoît
- Location within France Location within Bourgogne-Franche-Comté
- Coordinates: 46°59′37″N 6°27′46″E
- Country: France
- Region: Bourgogne-Franche-Comté
- Department: Doubs
- Arrondissement: Pontarlier
- Canton: Ornans
- Intercommunality: CC entre Doubs et Loue

Government
  - Mayor (2025–2026): Adrien Pellegrini
- Area^{1}: 46.52 km^{2} (17.96 sq mi)
- Highest elevation: 1,210 m (3,970 ft)
- Lowest elevation: 756 m (2,480 ft)
- Population (2023): 1,923
  - Density: 41.34/km^{2} (107.1/sq mi)
- Time zone: UTC+01:00 (CET)
  - Summer (DST): UTC+02:00 (CEST)
- INSEE/Postal code: 25390 /25650
- ^{1} French Land Register data, which excludes lakes, ponds, glaciers > 1 km^{2} (0.386 sq mi or 247 acres) and river estuaries.

Pays-de-Montbenoît (French pronunciation: [pei də mɔ̃bənwa], lit. 'Land of Montbenoît') is a commune in the Doubs department in the Bourgogne-Franche-Comté region in eastern France. It was formed on 1 January 2025, with the merger of Hauterive-la-Fresse, La Longeville, Montbenoît, Montflovin and Ville-du-Pont.

== See also ==
- Communes of the Doubs department
