= Morteau sausage =

Type of French sausage

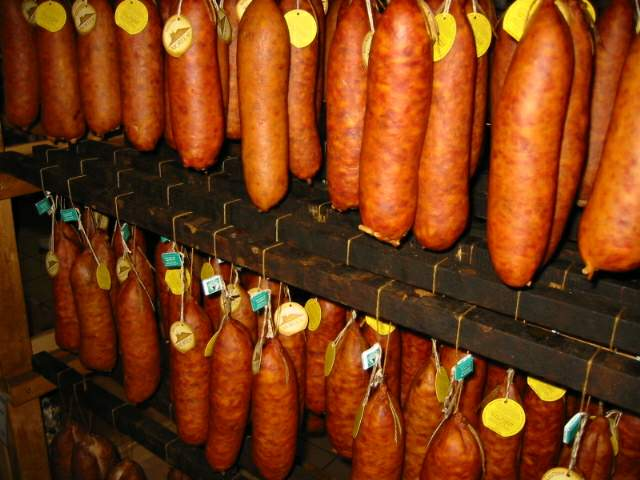
- Morteau sausage being smoked
- Alternative names: Belle de Morteau
- Type: Sausage
- Course: Main
- Place of origin: France
- Region or state: Europe
- Main ingredients: pork

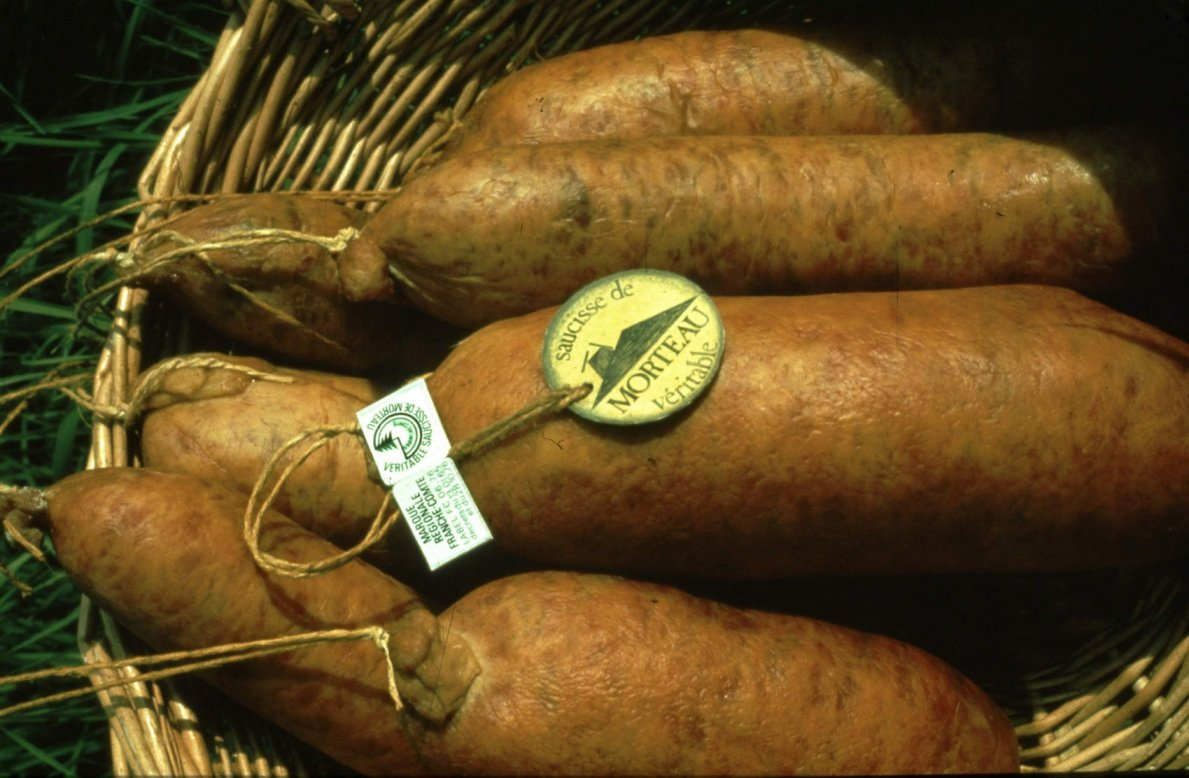
Morteau sausage.

The Morteau sausage (French: saucisse de Morteau; also known as the Belle de Morteau) is a traditional smoked sausage from the Franche-Comté French historical region and takes its name from the city of Morteau in the Doubs department. It is smoked in traditional pyramidal chimneys, called "tuyés". It is a strongly flavoured and very dense uncooked sausage.

It is produced on the plateau and in the Jura Mountains in the Doubs at an altitude greater than 600 m (2,000 ft). The city of Morteau is at the centre of this artisanal industry.

Morteau sausage is produced using only pork from the Franche-Comté region, because in this mountainous region the animals are fattened traditionally. In addition, to be permitted to use the label "Saucisse de Morteau", the sausages must be smoked for at least 48 hours with sawdust from conifer and juniper within the tuyé. It is not cooked, however, as the combustion is accompanied by a strong current of air.

The Morteau sausage is protected by the European Union's PGI label, which guarantees its quality, origin and method of preparation as a regional French specialty. Authentic Morteau typically comes with a metal tag as well as a small wooden stick wrapped around the end of the link.

== See also ==
- List of sausages
- List of smoked foods
