= Montflovin =

- Part of Pays-de-Montbenoît
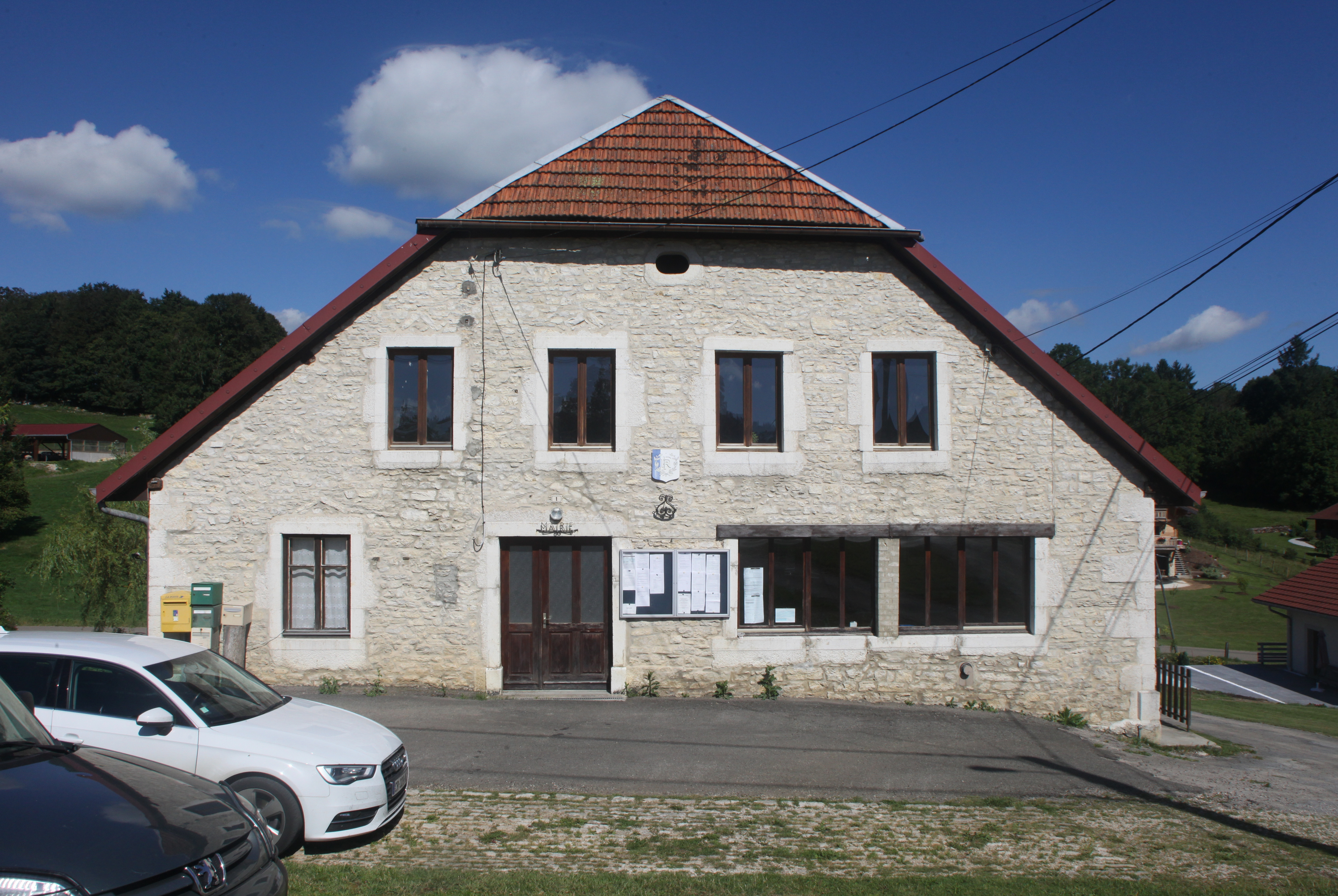
- The town hall in Montflovin
- Location of Montflovin
- Location within France Location within Bourgogne-Franche-Comté
- Coordinates: 46°59′14″N 6°26′45″E
- Country: France
- Region: Bourgogne-Franche-Comté
- Department: Doubs
- Arrondissement: Pontarlier
- Canton: Ornans
- Commune: Pays-de-Montbenoît
- Area^{1}: 3.35 km^{2} (1.29 sq mi)
- Highest elevation: 1,060 m (3,480 ft)
- Lowest elevation: 783 m (2,569 ft)
- Population (2023): 119
  - Density: 35.5/km^{2} (92.0/sq mi)
- Time zone: UTC+01:00 (CET)
  - Summer (DST): UTC+02:00 (CEST)
- Postal code: 25650
- ^{1} French Land Register data, which excludes lakes, ponds, glaciers > 1 km^{2} (0.386 sq mi or 247 acres) and river estuaries.

Montflovin (French pronunciation: [mɔ̃flɔvɛ̃]) is a former commune in the Doubs department in the Bourgogne-Franche-Comté region in eastern France. It was merged into the new commune Pays-de-Montbenoît on 1 January 2025.

== Geography ==
Montflovin lies 1.5 km (0.93 mi) north of Montbenoît.

== See also ==
- Communes of the Doubs department
