= Défilé d'Entre-Roches =

Coordinates: 46.9936°N 6.4628°E

The défilé d'Entre-Roches is a canyon or gorge of the upper Doubs in the department of Doubs in eastern France.

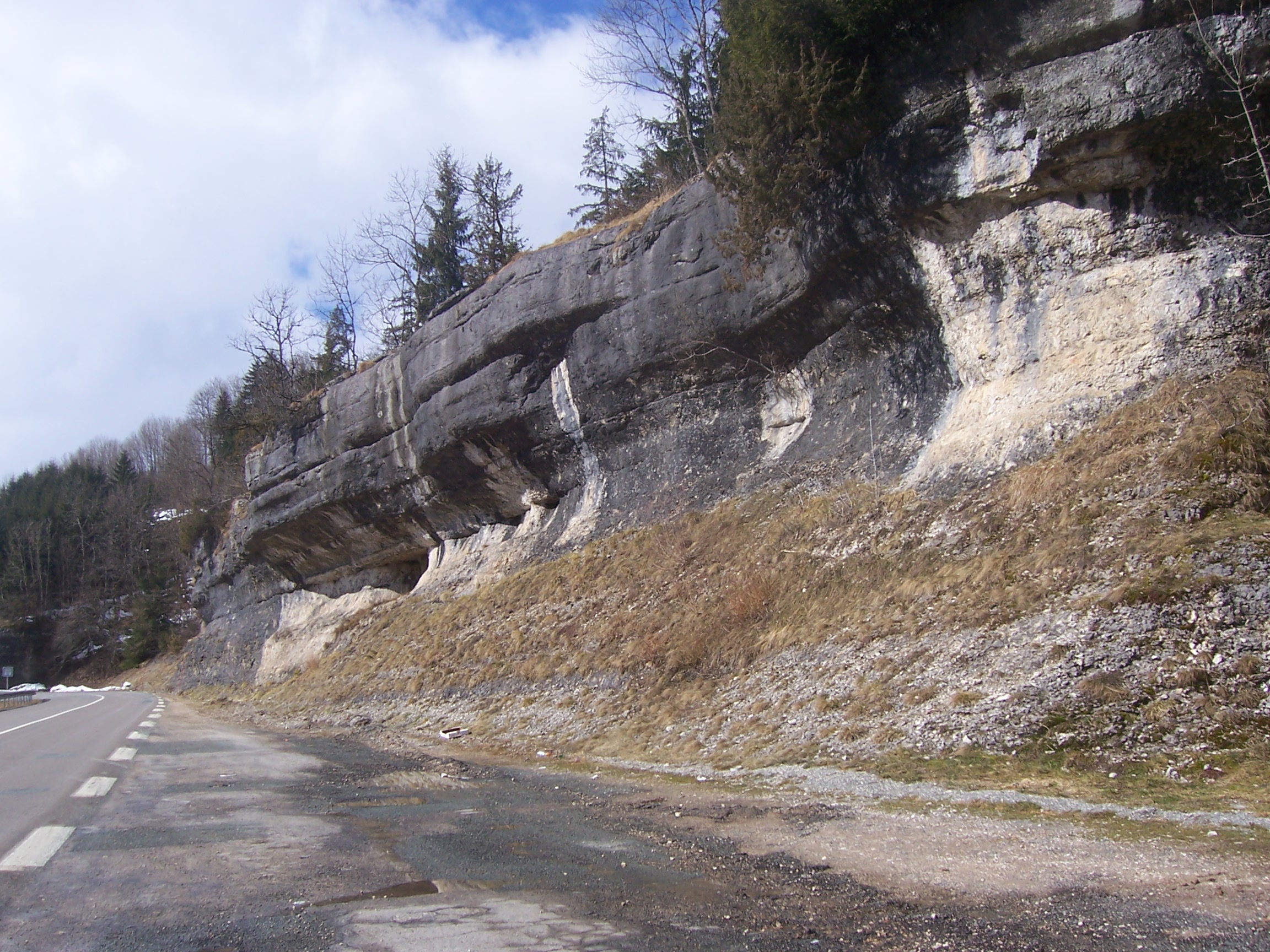
Cliffs in the canyon

It extends about 30 km along departmental highway 437 between Pontarlier and Morteau.
