= Pequignet =

- Industry: Watchmaking
- Founded: 1973; 53 years ago
- Founder: Émile Pequignet
- Headquarters: Morteau, France
- Key people: CEO: Philippe Spruch and Laurent Katz
- Products: Wristwatches, jewellery
- Number of employees: 47
- Website: www.pequignet.com

Pequignet (French pronunciation: [pekiɲɛ]) is an independent luxury watchmaking manufacturer based in Morteau, France. Founded by Émile Pequignet in 1973, the company is now owned by two entrepreneurs: Philippe Spruch and Laurent Katz.

== History ==
In 1973, Emile Pequignet, designer and founder of a watchmaking concern, set up his own business in Morteau, France. As a native of Haut-Doubs, he was a horse breeder and a recognized horseman; he took part in many national riding events and invested thirty percent of his communications budget in equestrian sponsorship. The Emile Pequignet brand was associated with the world of horseriding and in 1980 was presented an “Equitation” line of wristwatches, whose dials represent horses' heads engraved on a coin. Another inspiration that Emile Pequignet took was exotic countries. This is seen in the collections MOOREA (inspired by the island in French Polynesia), SAKKARA (the most ancient pyramid in Egypt) and MASSAI (name of an African tribe).

When retirement arrived, Emile Pequignet looked for a successor who would retain the firm’s independence. In 2004 Didier Leibundgut, marketing director at Zenith, acquired control of Pequignet's watchmaking business.

At the beginning of his governing the brand, Pequignet offered customers a choice of more than 150 different watch straps and bracelets in a variety of colors and materials, enabling the appearance of the watch to be changed at the whim of the wearer. The brand was mostly targeted to women. Later, in 2006, Leibundgut decided to transform the brand into fine watchmaking and opened its in-house laboratory. In 2010 the brand installed its manufacture workshops and created its own mechanical movement: the Calibre Royal. Despite the creation of the in-house movement, Leibundgut had no success in building the business for sale. Heavy investment, designed to transform Pequignet into a fine watchmaking manufacture led to a difficult financial year in 2012 and as a result the company became almost bankrupt, and was taken by two private investors, the managers of LaCie: Laurent Katz and Philippe Spruch.

Laurent Katz became the company's Chairman. An experienced manager, he devised a new development strategy for Pequignet. The investment included modern research, design and manufacturing facilities. The laboratory created the company’s first mechanical, in-house movement, the Calibre Royale, which is now a part of the watches of the Manufacture Collection. The introduction of the Manufacture Collection gave Pequignet two distinct lines, joining the Moorea line with its signature strap links, designed by the founder of the company Emile Pequignet.
