= Sommêtres =

Mountain in Switzerland

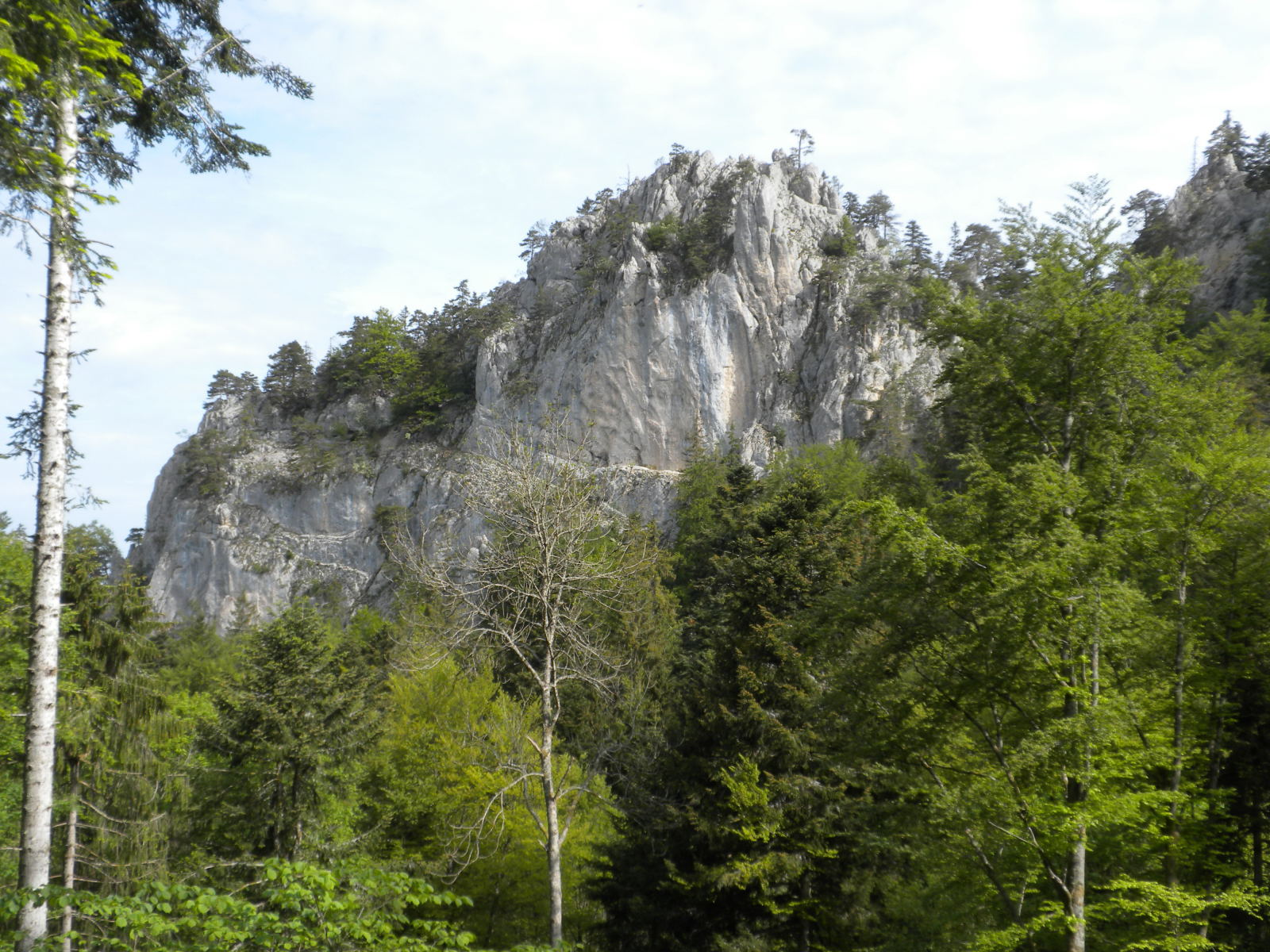

Highest point
- Elevation: 1,079 m (3,540 ft)
- Coordinates: 47°14′11″N 6°57′56″E

Geography
- Location within Switzerland
- Location: Jura, Switzerland
- Parent range: Jura Mountains

The Sommêtres (1,079 m) are a chain of rocks overlooking the Doubs, north of Le Noirmont in the canton of Canton of Jura.

The Sommêtres are a popular climbing area.
