= Lac des Brenets =

Lake in Canton of Neuchâtel, Switzerland

- Lac de Chaillexon
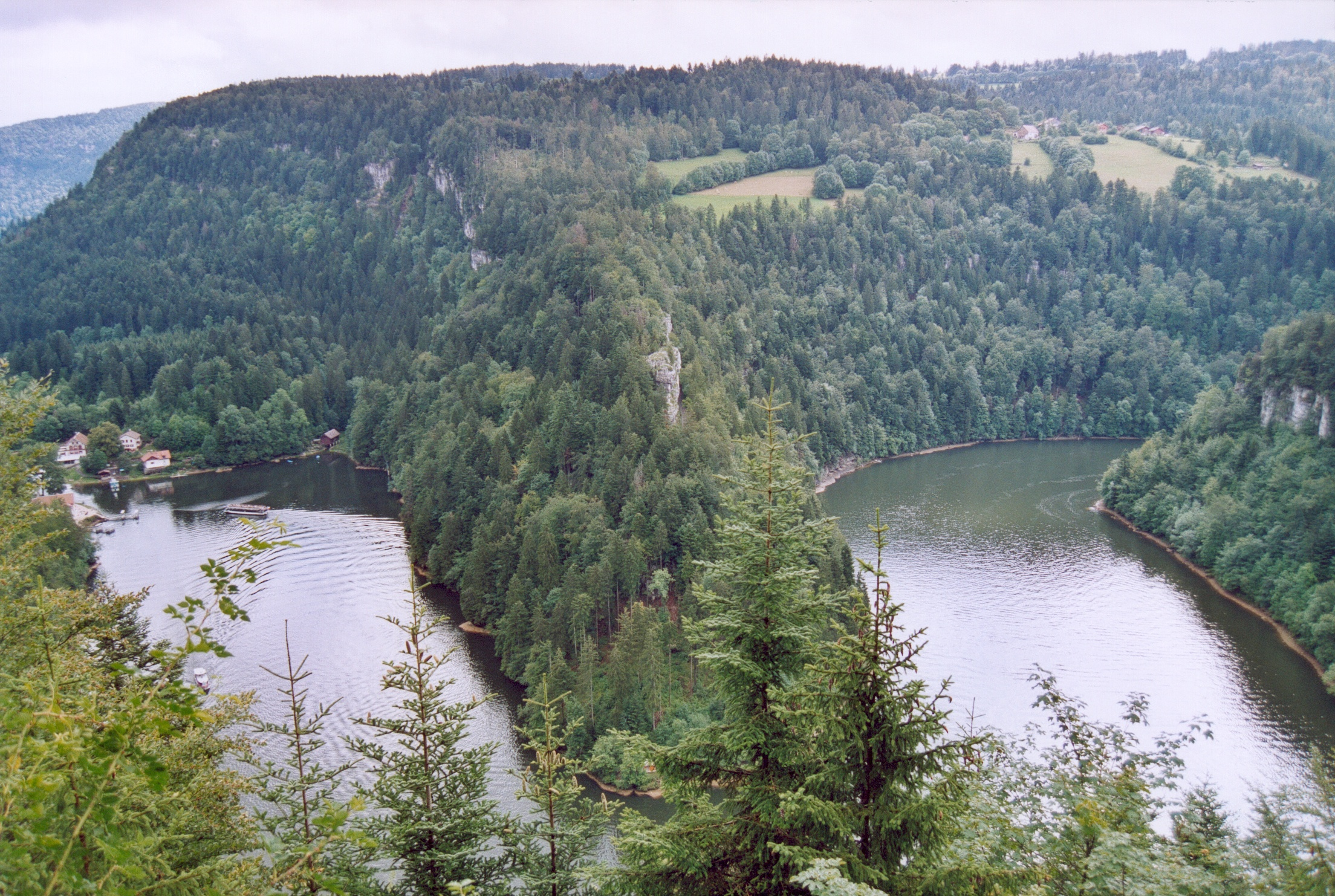

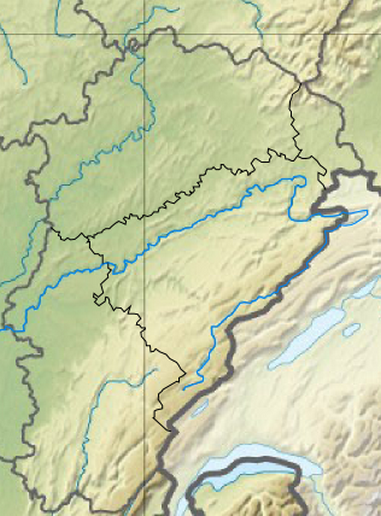
- Location within Canton of Neuchâtel Location within Franche-Comté Location within Switzerland Location within France Location within Alps
- Interactive map of Lac des Brenets
- Location: Franche-Comté, Canton of Neuchâtel
- Coordinates: 47°4′9″N 6°41′52″E
- Primary inflows: Doubs, Rançonnière
- Primary outflows: Doubs
- Basin countries: France, Switzerland
- Max. length: 3.5 km (2.2 mi)
- Max. width: 250 m (820 ft)
- Surface area: 0.8 km^{2} (0.31 sq mi)
- Max. depth: 26 m (85 ft)
- Water volume: 5.7 hm^{3} (4,600 acre⋅ft)
- Surface elevation: 750 m (2,460 ft)
- Settlements: Villers-le-Lac

Lac des Brenets (Swiss name) or Lac de Chaillexon (French name) is a lake on the river Doubs on the border of Switzerland and France.

== Characteristics ==
The depression in which the lake lies was formed by the movements of a glacier, while the lake itself was formed by a natural barrier around 12,000 years ago. At the downstream end is a waterfall known as the Saut du Doubs. A few hundred metres away, a bridge connects the French and Swiss sides of the lake.

The lake was effectively dried out completely during the European drought of 2022, causing all ship operations to cease.

== Photographs ==
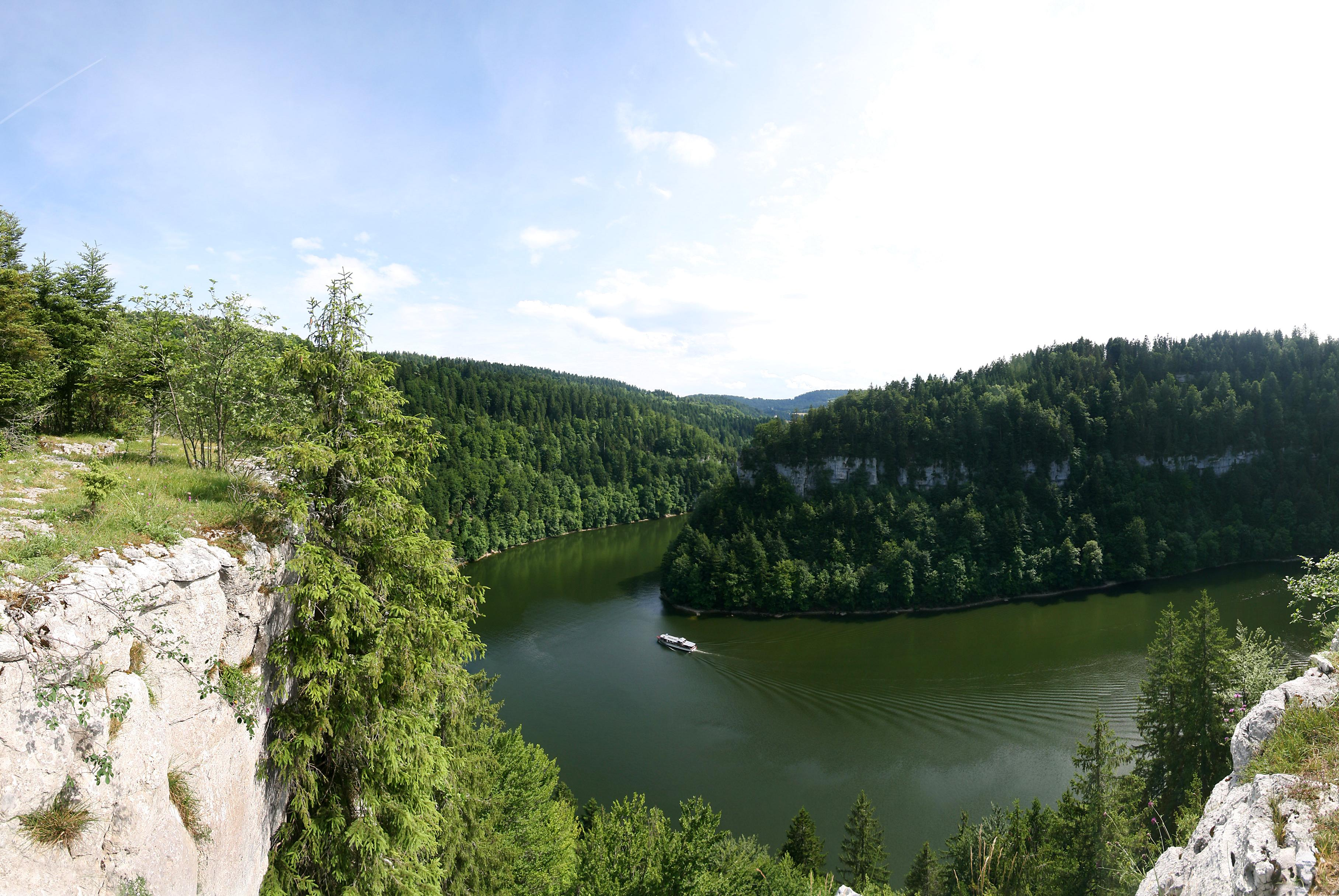

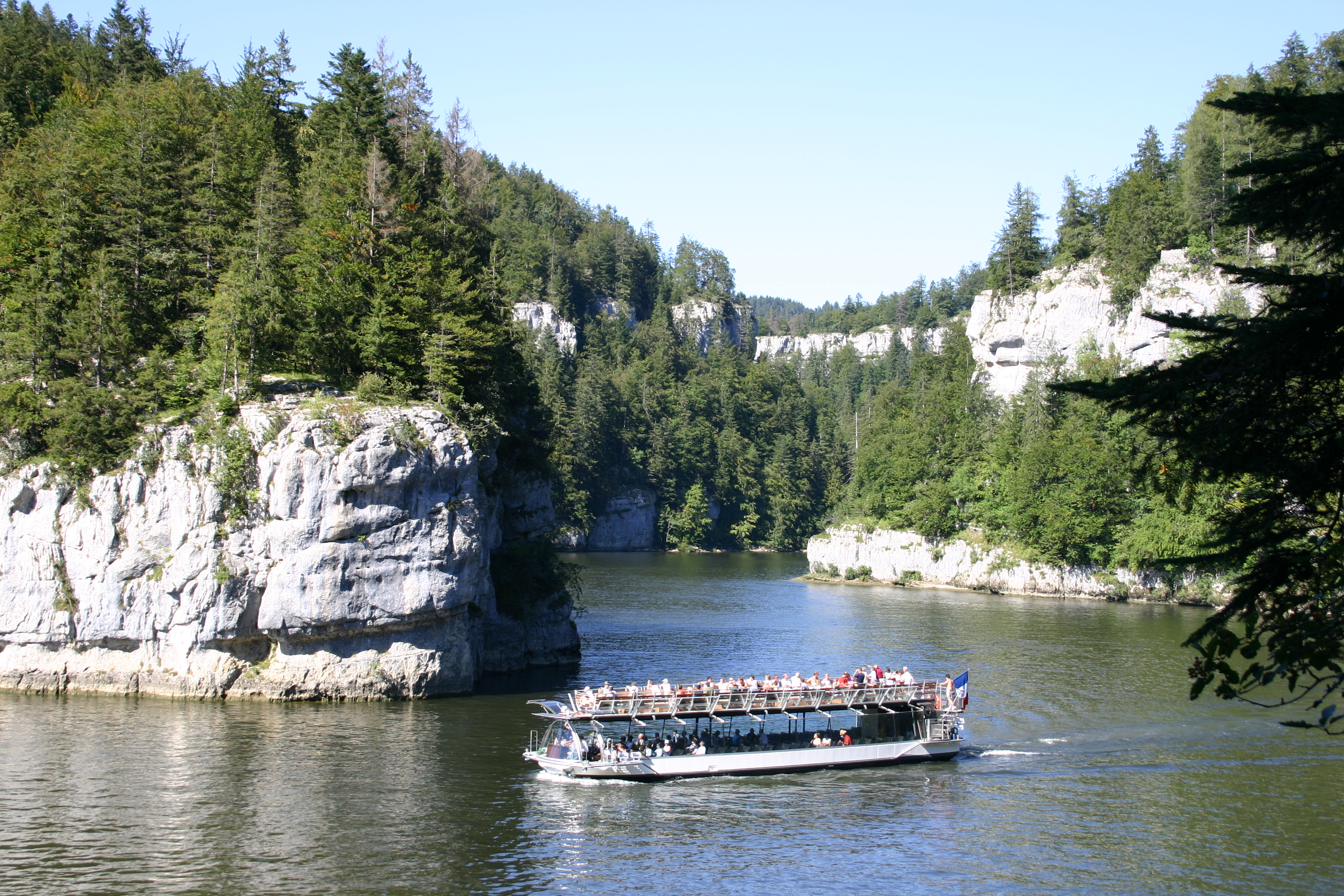
A tourist boat on the narrow lake

== See also ==
- List of lakes of Switzerland
