= Verdun-sur-le-Doubs =

- Part of Verdun-Ciel
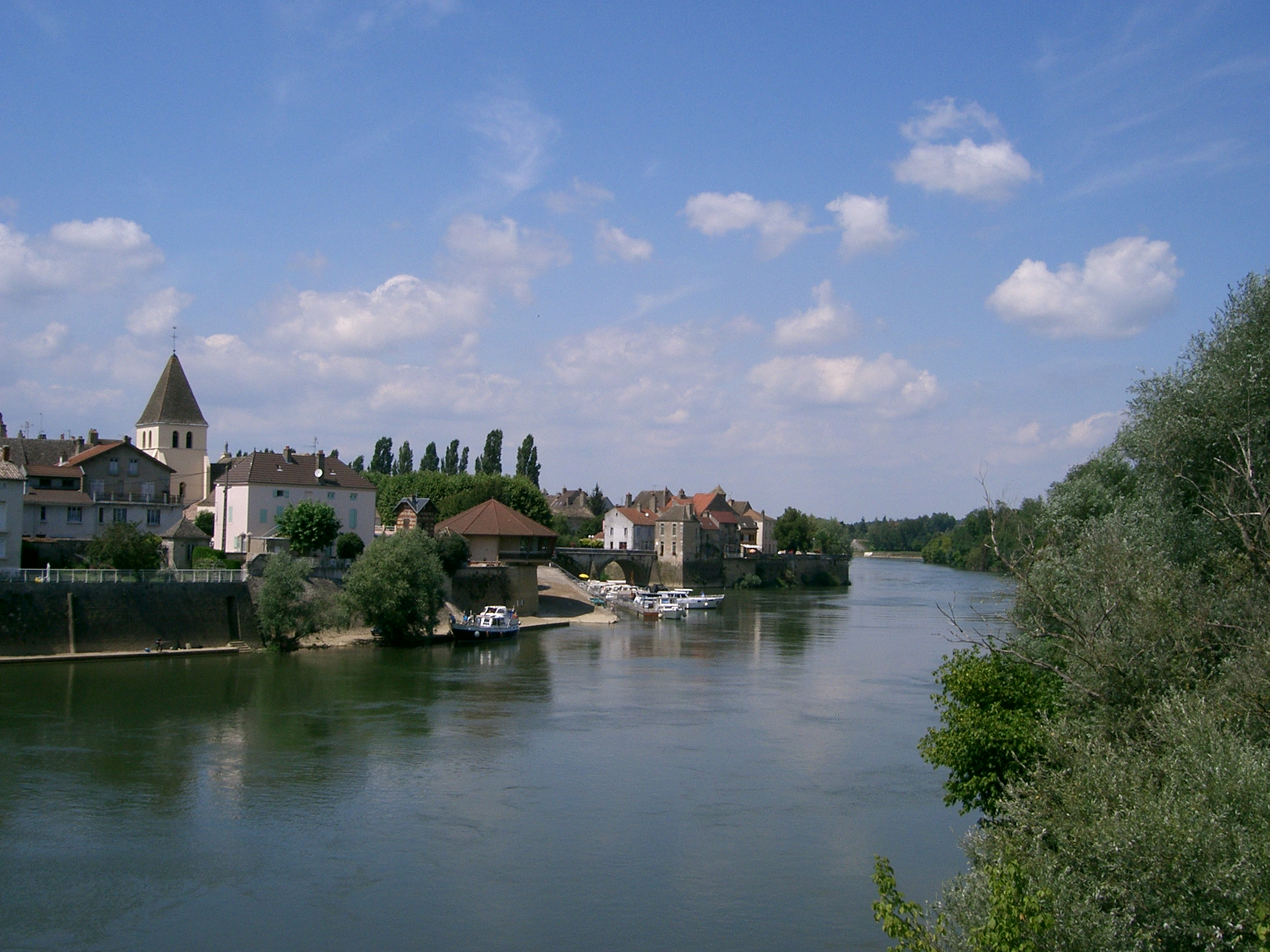
- A general view of Verdun-sur-le-Doubs

- Coat of arms
- Location of Verdun-sur-le-Doubs
- Location within France Location within Bourgogne-Franche-Comté
- Coordinates: 46°53′49″N 5°01′27″E
- Country: France
- Region: Bourgogne-Franche-Comté
- Department: Saône-et-Loire
- Arrondissement: Chalon-sur-Saône
- Canton: Gergy
- Commune: Verdun-Ciel
- Area^{1}: 7.27 km^{2} (2.81 sq mi)
- Elevation: 180 m (590 ft)
- Highest elevation: 180 m (590 ft)
- Lowest elevation: 173 m (568 ft)
- Population (2022): 942
  - Density: 130/km^{2} (336/sq mi)
- Time zone: UTC+01:00 (CET)
  - Summer (DST): UTC+02:00 (CEST)
- Postal code: 71350
- ^{1} French Land Register data, which excludes lakes, ponds, glaciers > 1 km^{2} (0.386 sq mi or 247 acres) and river estuaries.

Verdun-sur-le-Doubs (French pronunciation: [vɛʁdœ̃ syʁ lə du], lit. 'Verdun on the Doubs') is a former commune in the eastern French department of Saône-et-Loire. On 1 January 2025, it was merged into the new commune of Verdun-Ciel.

== Position and history ==
It is in the south-centre of Bourgogne-Franche-Comté at the confluence of the Doubs and the Saône in the Bresse plain, near Beaune and about 20 kilometres (12 mi) north-east of Chalon-sur-Saône.

It has been more than a farmstead since early medieval times and acted as a fortified place at the French kingdom's frontier for several centuries.

As to the German military administration in occupied France during World War II Verdun-sur-le-Doubs was on the north-south Demarcation Line.

== Community of communes ==
Since 2015, Verdun-sur-le-Doubs is part of the Communauté de communes Saône Doubs Bresse.

== Economy ==
Today it is, aside from retirement, a highly agricultural and touristic local economy well known for fishing, river boating, local produce and cuisine. Pôchouse is the local dish of various freshwater fish, dry Burgundy white wine (Bourgogne aligoté), cream, herbs and seasoning.

== See also ==
- Communes of the Saône-et-Loire department
