= Verdun-Ciel =

- Commune
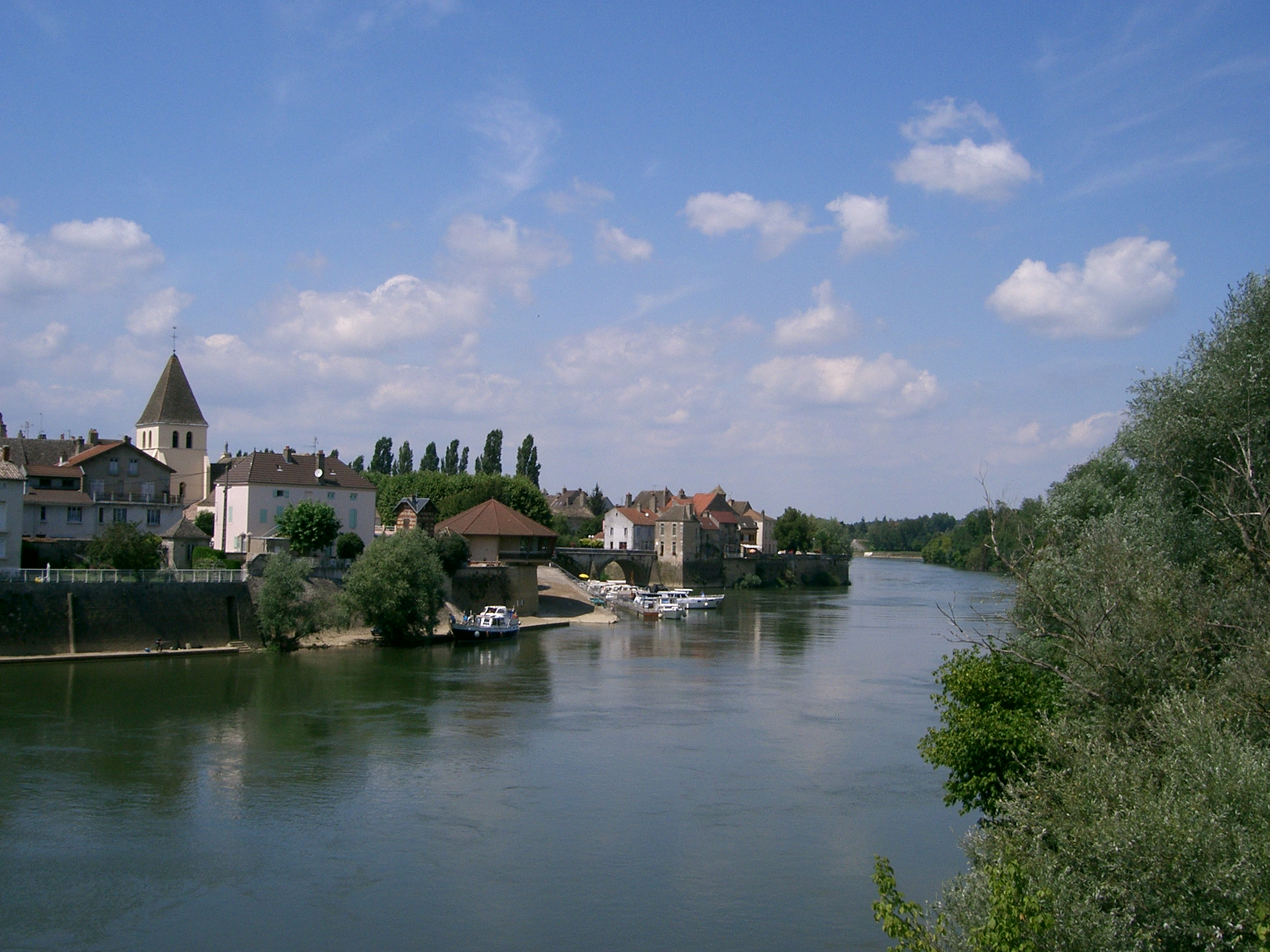
- A general view of Verdun-sur-le-Doubs
- Location of Verdun-Ciel
- Location within France Location within Bourgogne-Franche-Comté
- Coordinates: 46°53′49″N 5°01′27″E
- Country: France
- Region: Bourgogne-Franche-Comté
- Department: Saône-et-Loire
- Arrondissement: Chalon-sur-Saône
- Canton: Gergy
- Intercommunality: CC Saône Doubs Bresse

Government
  - Mayor (2025–2026): Daniel Ratte
- Area^{1}: 24.46 km^{2} (9.44 sq mi)
- Highest elevation: 196 m (643 ft)
- Lowest elevation: 173 m (568 ft)
- Population (2023): 1,811
  - Density: 74.04/km^{2} (191.8/sq mi)
- Time zone: UTC+01:00 (CET)
  - Summer (DST): UTC+02:00 (CEST)
- INSEE/Postal code: 71566 /71350
- ^{1} French Land Register data, which excludes lakes, ponds, glaciers > 1 km^{2} (0.386 sq mi or 247 acres) and river estuaries.

Verdun-Ciel (French pronunciation: [vɛʁdɛ̃ sjɛl]) is a commune in the eastern French department of Saône-et-Loire. It was formed on 1 January 2025 with the merger of Verdun-sur-le-Doubs and Ciel.

== See also ==
- Communes of the Saône-et-Loire department
