= Ciel, Saône-et-Loire =

Ciel
- Part of Verdun-Ciel
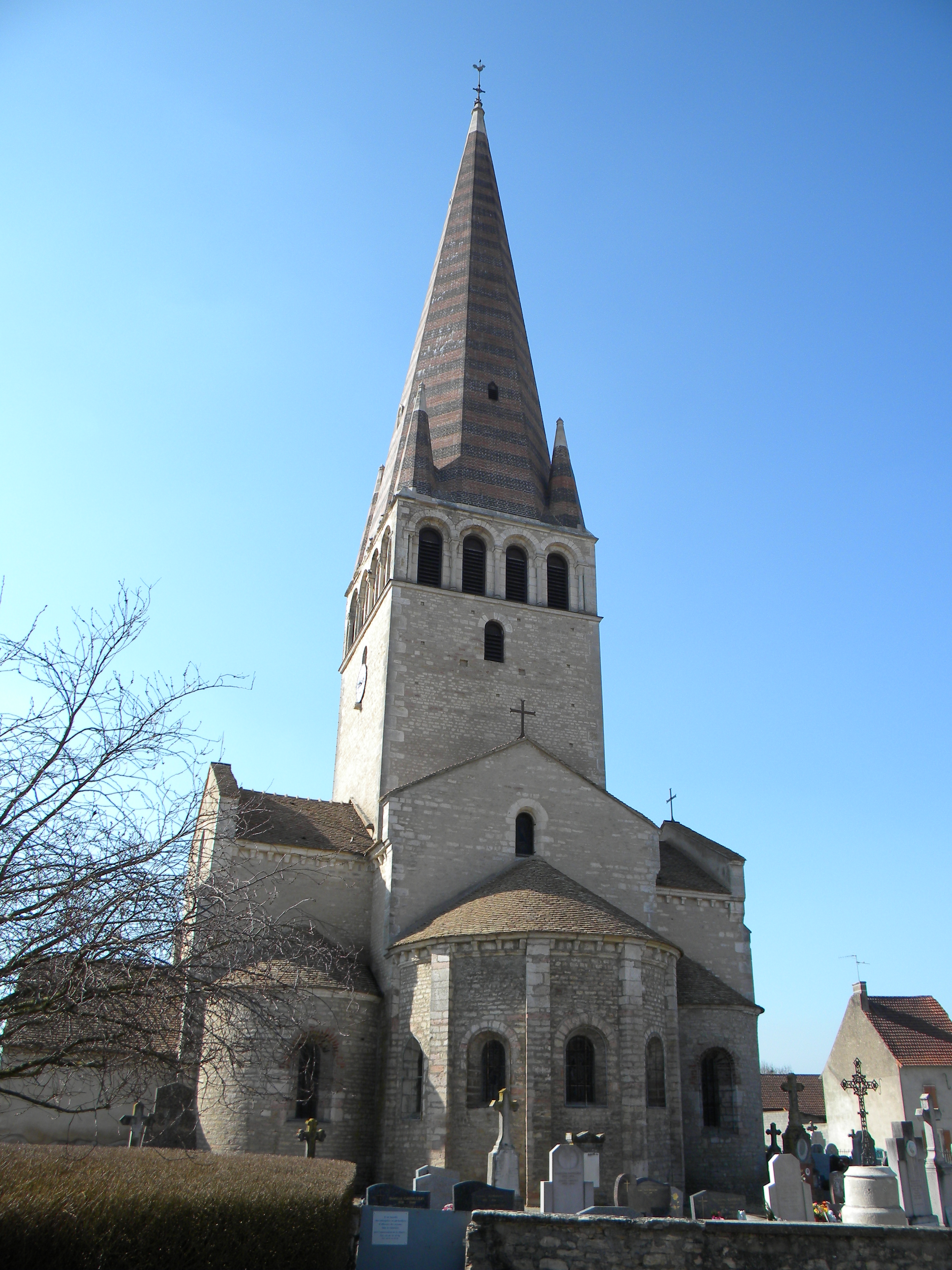
- The church in Ciel

- Coat of arms
- Location of Ciel
- Location within France Location within Bourgogne-Franche-Comté
- Coordinates: 46°52′59″N 5°02′36″E
- Country: France
- Region: Bourgogne-Franche-Comté
- Department: Saône-et-Loire
- Arrondissement: Chalon-sur-Saône
- Canton: Gergy
- Commune: Verdun-Ciel
- Area^{1}: 17.19 km^{2} (6.64 sq mi)
- Elevation: 184 m (604 ft)
- Highest elevation: 196 m (643 ft)
- Lowest elevation: 173 m (568 ft)
- Population (2022): 896
  - Density: 52.1/km^{2} (135/sq mi)
- Time zone: UTC+01:00 (CET)
  - Summer (DST): UTC+02:00 (CEST)
- Postal code: 71350
- ^{1} French Land Register data, which excludes lakes, ponds, glaciers > 1 km^{2} (0.386 sq mi or 247 acres) and river estuaries.

Ciel (French pronunciation: [sjɛl]) is a former commune in the Saône-et-Loire department in the region of Bourgogne-Franche-Comté in eastern France. On 1 January 2025, it was merged into the new commune of Verdun-Ciel.

== See also ==
- Communes of the Saône-et-Loire department
