= Morteau =

- Commune
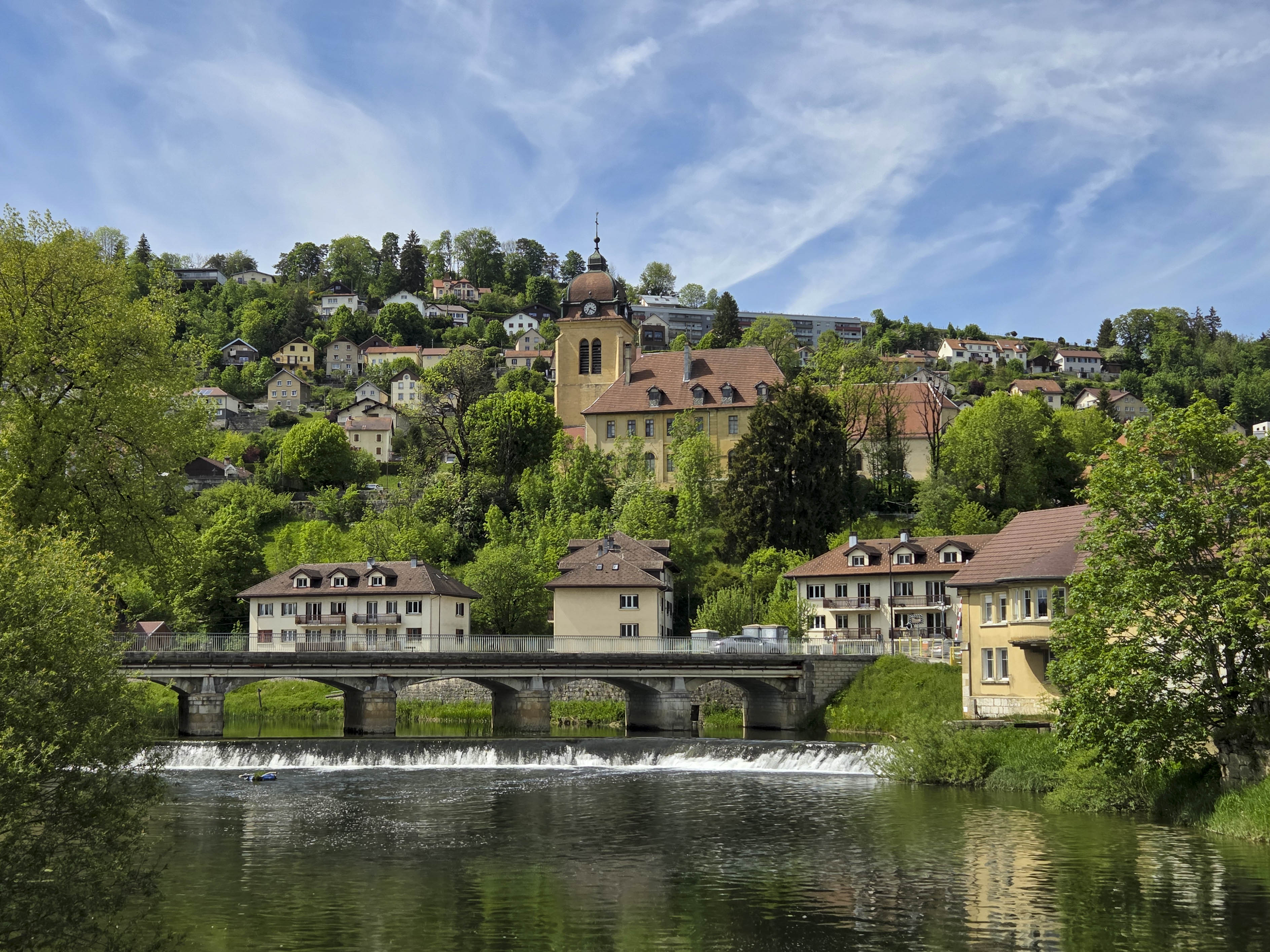
- Morteau on the banks of the River Doubs

- Coat of arms
- Location of Morteau
- Location within France Location within Bourgogne-Franche-Comté
- Coordinates: 47°03′32″N 6°36′25″E
- Country: France
- Region: Bourgogne-Franche-Comté
- Department: Doubs
- Arrondissement: Pontarlier
- Canton: Morteau
- Intercommunality: Val de Morteau

Government
  - Mayor (2020–2026): Cédric Bôle
- Area^{1}: 14.11 km^{2} (5.45 sq mi)
- Elevation: 800 m (2,600 ft)
- Highest elevation: 1,114 m (3,655 ft)
- Lowest elevation: 750 m (2,460 ft)
- Population (2023): 6,953
  - Density: 492.8/km^{2} (1,276/sq mi)
- Time zone: UTC+01:00 (CET)
  - Summer (DST): UTC+02:00 (CEST)
- INSEE/Postal code: 25411 /25500
- ^{1} French Land Register data, which excludes lakes, ponds, glaciers > 1 km^{2} (0.386 sq mi or 247 acres) and river estuaries.

Morteau (French pronunciation: [mɔʁto]) is a commune, in the Doubs department in the Bourgogne-Franche-Comté region, eastern France.

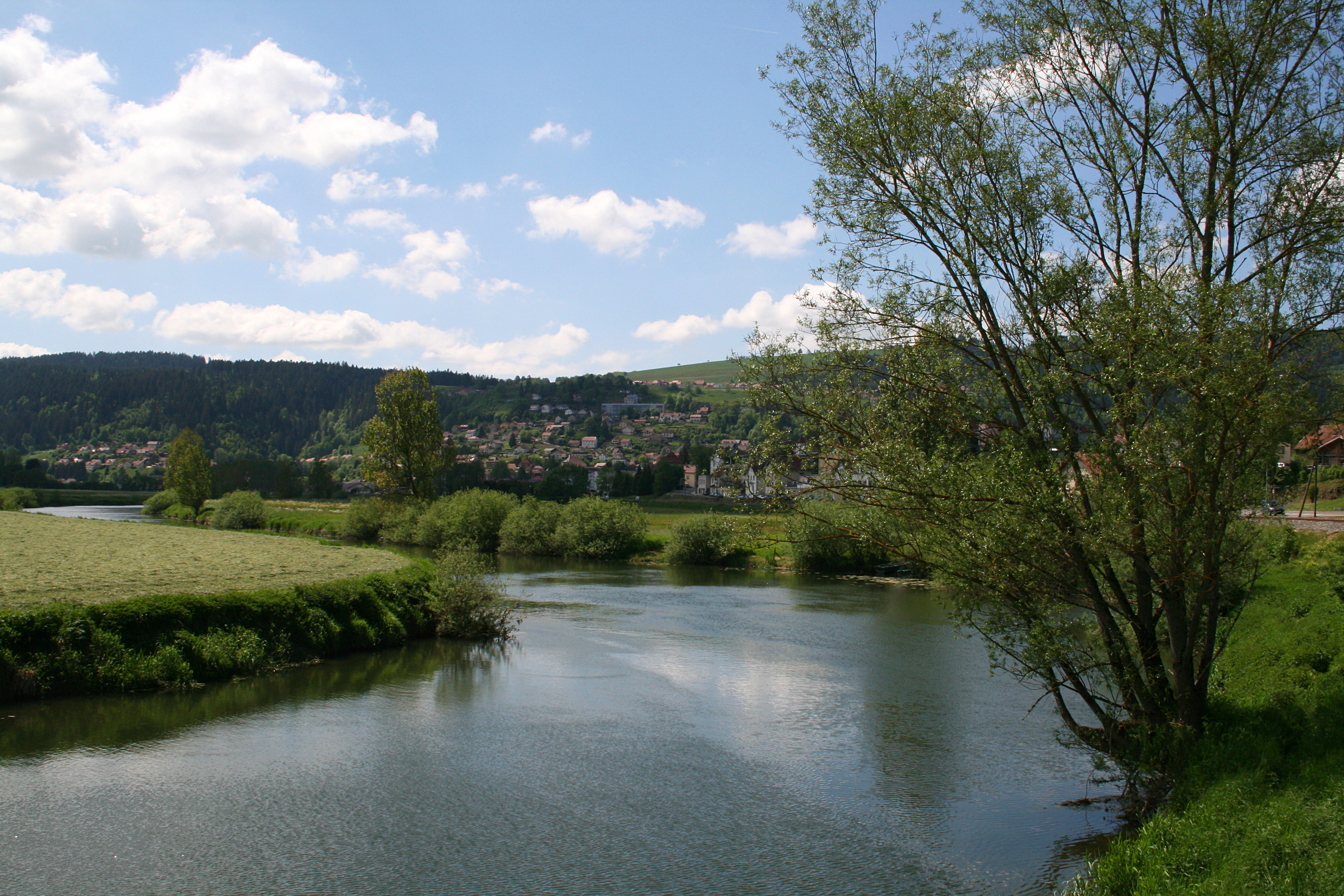
The road of Villers-le-Lac (D215) along the Doubs (river).

== Geography ==
It is situated in a widening of the Doubs river valley. The proximity of Switzerland (11 km to Le Locle, 21 km to La Chaux-de-Fonds) gives employment to trans-border workers, as well as providing customers for the businesses of the Morteau valley.

== History ==
The Roman expansion (200 BCE, 100 CE) began the decline of the Celts. At the Battle of Alesia, alongside the Arvernes tribe, there were an equal number of Mandubiens, the people of Doubs. They were the best riders of Vercingetorix.

=== Early Middle Ages ===
At the end of the Roman Empire, the Alamanni invaded the region, followed by the Burgundians. The region was influenced by the Normans, the Hungarian descendants of the Huns and the Saracens. These Arabs, stopped by Charles Martel in 732, had followed the valley of the river Saône. Locally, their name was given to the tiny village of Sarrazins above Montlebon.

=== Middle Ages ===
In 1105 the name of Morteau appeared for the first time officially. The name of Franche-Comté, however, did not appear until 1366. A half dozen Benedictine monks of the Cluny order arrived at this time to clear the mountains. They stayed with a resident of the Mondey area and quickly hired workers. They brought in whole families into five districts, each now towns in their own right: Morteau, Villers-le-Lac, Montlebon and Grand'Combe-Châteleu.

Morteau had a feudal castle built on the eastern side of Mondey, it overlooked the ancient Celtic road which linked Besançon to Switzerland. The plague killed two thirds of the valley's inhabitants in 1349. The population was rebuilt by immigrants from the canton of Fribourg and the Aoste valley.

=== Fires ===
Over eight centuries, seventeen major fires occurred in Morteau, the worst occurring in 1639, 1683, 1702, 1849 and 1865.

== Economy ==
For many centuries, livestock have been a mainstay of the economy. It is impossible to give a precise origin to the well known montbéliarde breed since all of the livestock in central Europe have similar characteristics and transborder exchanges were always common. One can see white cattle with red markings in certain provinces of Czechia and Slovakia similar to those from Franche-Comté. The traditional smoked sausages, Morteau Sausage for example, as well as the drinks (syrups and lemonades Rième) and candies (chocolates and caramels Klaus) have made the city renowned.

Smoked "Saucisse de Morteau" has to meet demanding criteria, such as the origin, the pigs' fodder, the type of wood that has been used to smoke the sausages and the specific model of chimney. It has to be produced in Franche-Comté. Every August, a two-day celebration takes place into town, in order to determine the "Sausage Gold Award", and it has been ranked among the top three stupidest and most pointless village fete of the country, by a famous weekly French magazine.

Watchmaking was for many years the principal manufacturing industry of the region. In 1680, a young smith from Sagne repaired an imported English watch and decided to copy it. The watchmaker Pequignet is based in Morteau.

== Population ==
Historical population
Year	Pop.	±% p.a.
1968	6,158	—
1975	6,690	+1.19%
1982	6,445	−0.53%
1990	6,458	+0.03%
1999	6,375	−0.14%
2007	6,403	+0.05%
2012	6,779	+1.15%
2017	6,935	+0.46%
2023	6,953	+0.04%
Source: INSEE

== Sights ==
Morteau has two attractive chateaus: the Château Pertusier and the current city hall.

- The Château Pertusier was built in 1576 by the Cuche family. During the Swedish attack in 1639, the tower at the top of the winding staircase caught fire and the western side was shot at. One can still see the bullet scars of the biscayens Swedes. The Bole family then became the owner. During the French Revolution a lawyer from Besançon, Jean-Charles Pertusier, bought the building, which had become national property, for a sum of 900 987 pounds. The house and its grounds were bought by the commune in 1935. This building is now one of the few examples of Renaissance Architecture in the Haut-Doubs.
- The city hall was built in 1590 by the Fauche family. Occupied by the officers of Saxe-Weimar, it did not suffer during the war and passed into the hands of the Benedictines, then into those of the Roussel brothers. The commune of Morteau acquired the property in 1793. It now holds some of the municipal offices as well as the famous Black Book, kept safe in the mayor's office. In 1454, a city notary wrote in this book the records of the entire priory. It contains 54 charters from 1188 to 1514, letters of charter, sentences, arrests and conventions. Brought to Switzerland during the Swedish invasion, it was recovered intact after the war.

== Notable ==
- The train station in the city is the site of various scenes from the film Monsieur Batignole starring Gérard Jugnot and Damien Jouillerot (who is from the region);
- It is the site of several scenes from the film L'Adversaire with Daniel Auteuil;
- Laurence Semonin, known as "Madeleine Proust", is from Arces, a hamlet of Morteau;
- The mathematician Jean Claude Bouquet (1819–1885) was from Morteau.

== International relations ==
Morteau is twinned with:

- Vöhrenbach, Germany

== See also ==
- Communes of the Doubs department
- Défilé d'Entre-Roches
