= Hauterive-la-Fresse =

- Part of Pays-de-Montbenoît
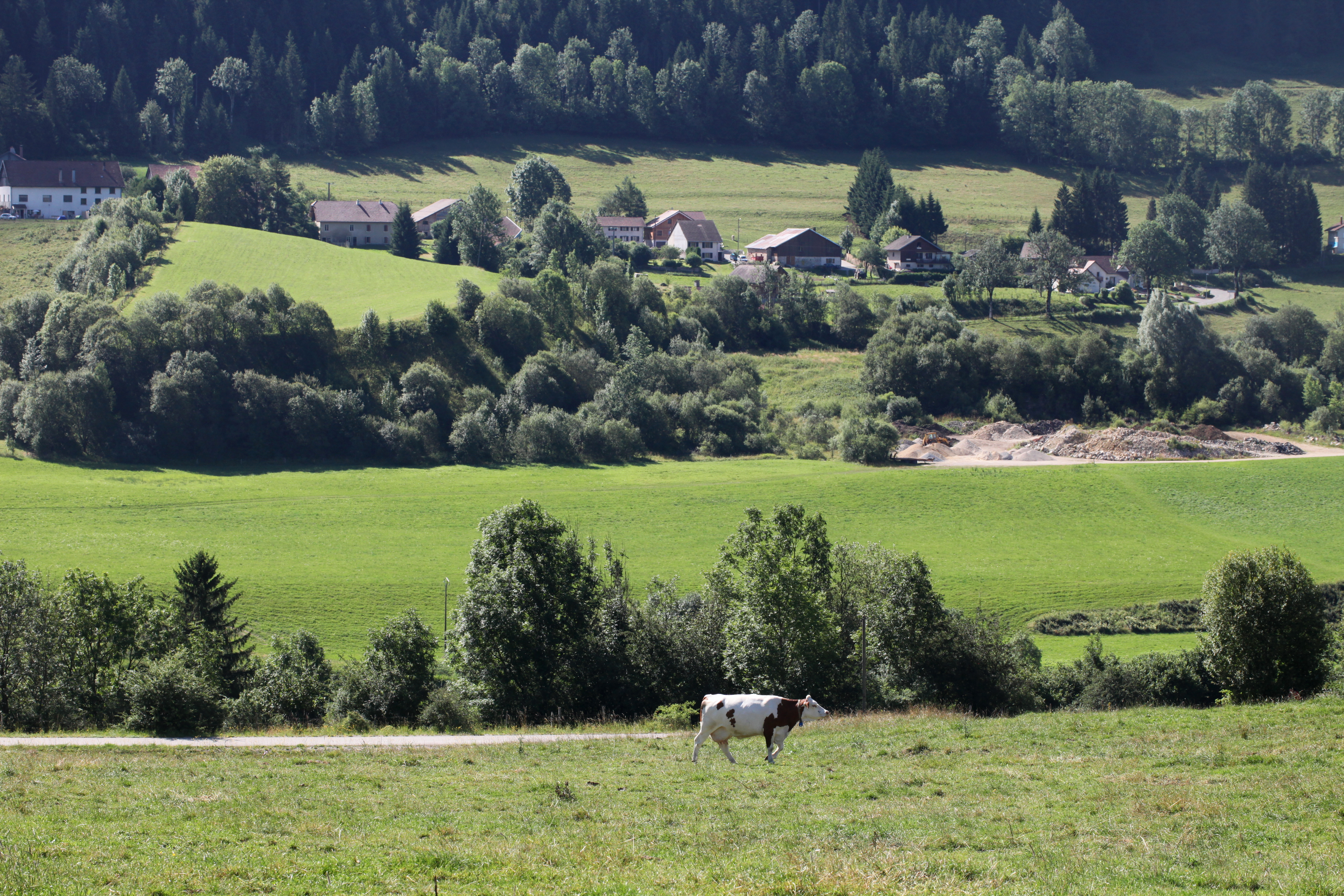
- A general view of Hauterive-la-Fresse
- Location of Hauterive-la-Fresse
- Location within France Location within Bourgogne-Franche-Comté
- Coordinates: 46°58′12″N 6°26′59″E
- Country: France
- Region: Bourgogne-Franche-Comté
- Department: Doubs
- Arrondissement: Pontarlier
- Canton: Ornans
- Commune: Pays-de-Montbenoît
- Area^{1}: 7.46 km^{2} (2.88 sq mi)
- Highest elevation: 1,210 m (3,970 ft)
- Lowest elevation: 778 m (2,552 ft)
- Population (2023): 229
  - Density: 30.7/km^{2} (79.5/sq mi)
- Time zone: UTC+01:00 (CET)
  - Summer (DST): UTC+02:00 (CEST)
- Postal code: 25650
- ^{1} French Land Register data, which excludes lakes, ponds, glaciers > 1 km^{2} (0.386 sq mi or 247 acres) and river estuaries.

Hauterive-la-Fresse (French pronunciation: [otʁiv la fʁɛs]; Arpitan: Âtèrua-la-Frèssa) is a former commune in the Doubs department in the Bourgogne-Franche-Comté region in eastern France. It was merged into the new commune Pays-de-Montbenoît on 1 January 2025.

== See also ==
- Communes of the Doubs department
