= Ville-du-Pont =

- Part of Pays-de-Montbenoît
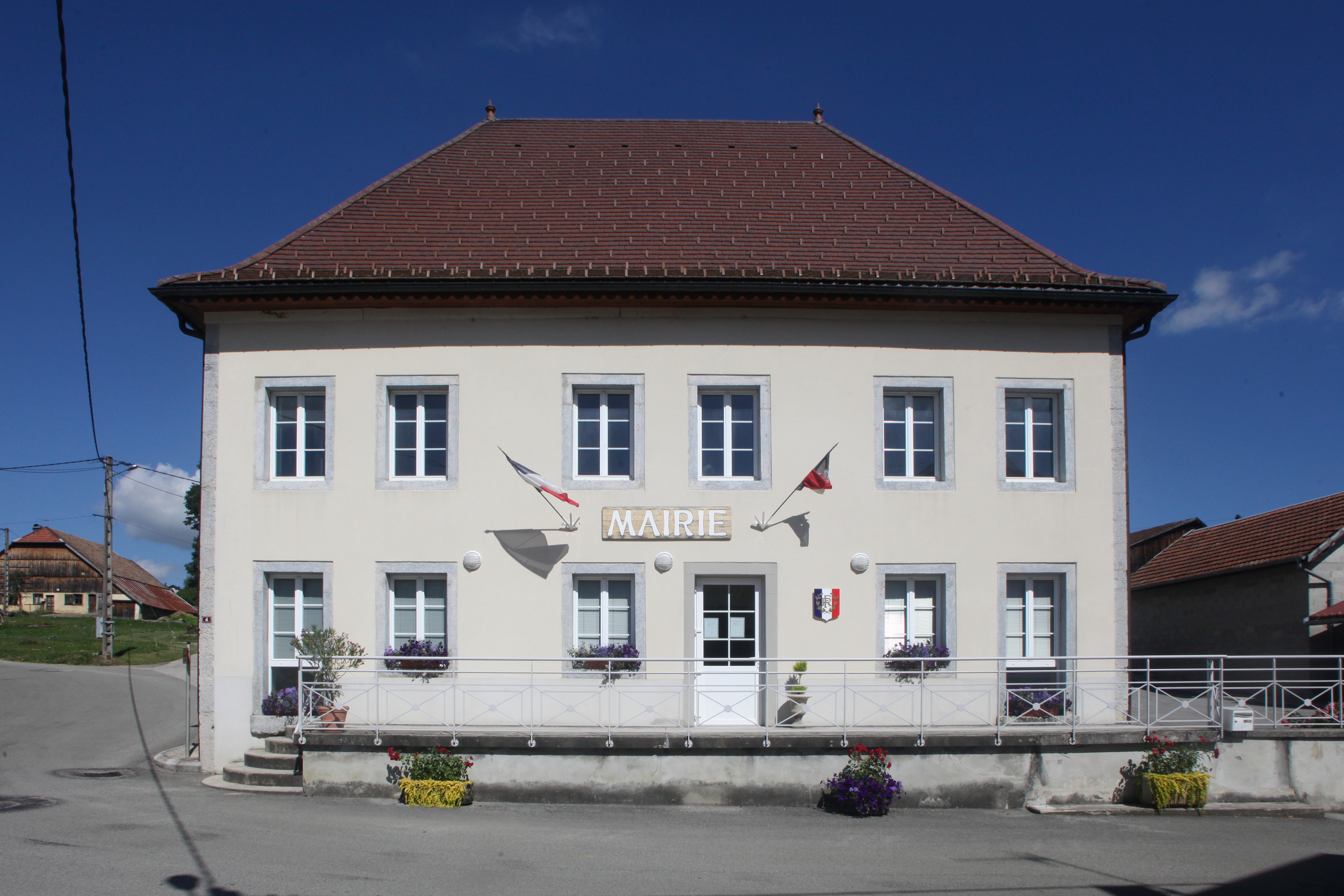
- The town hall in Ville-du-Pont
- Location of Ville-du-Pont
- Location within France Location within Bourgogne-Franche-Comté
- Coordinates: 47°00′13″N 6°28′42″E
- Country: France
- Region: Bourgogne-Franche-Comté
- Department: Doubs
- Arrondissement: Pontarlier
- Canton: Ornans
- Commune: Pays-de-Montbenoît
- Area^{1}: 15.02 km^{2} (5.80 sq mi)
- Highest elevation: 1,199 m (3,934 ft)
- Lowest elevation: 758 m (2,487 ft)
- Population (2023): 324
  - Density: 21.6/km^{2} (55.9/sq mi)
- Time zone: UTC+01:00 (CET)
  - Summer (DST): UTC+02:00 (CEST)
- Postal code: 25650
- ^{1} French Land Register data, which excludes lakes, ponds, glaciers > 1 km^{2} (0.386 sq mi or 247 acres) and river estuaries.

Ville-du-Pont (French pronunciation: [vil dy pɔ̃]; Arpitan: La Vla-du-Pon) is a former commune in the Doubs department in the Bourgogne-Franche-Comté region in eastern France. It was merged into the new commune Pays-de-Montbenoît on 1 January 2025.

== See also ==
- Communes of the Doubs department
