= Montbenoît =

Commune in Doubs, France

- Part of Pays-de-Montbenoît
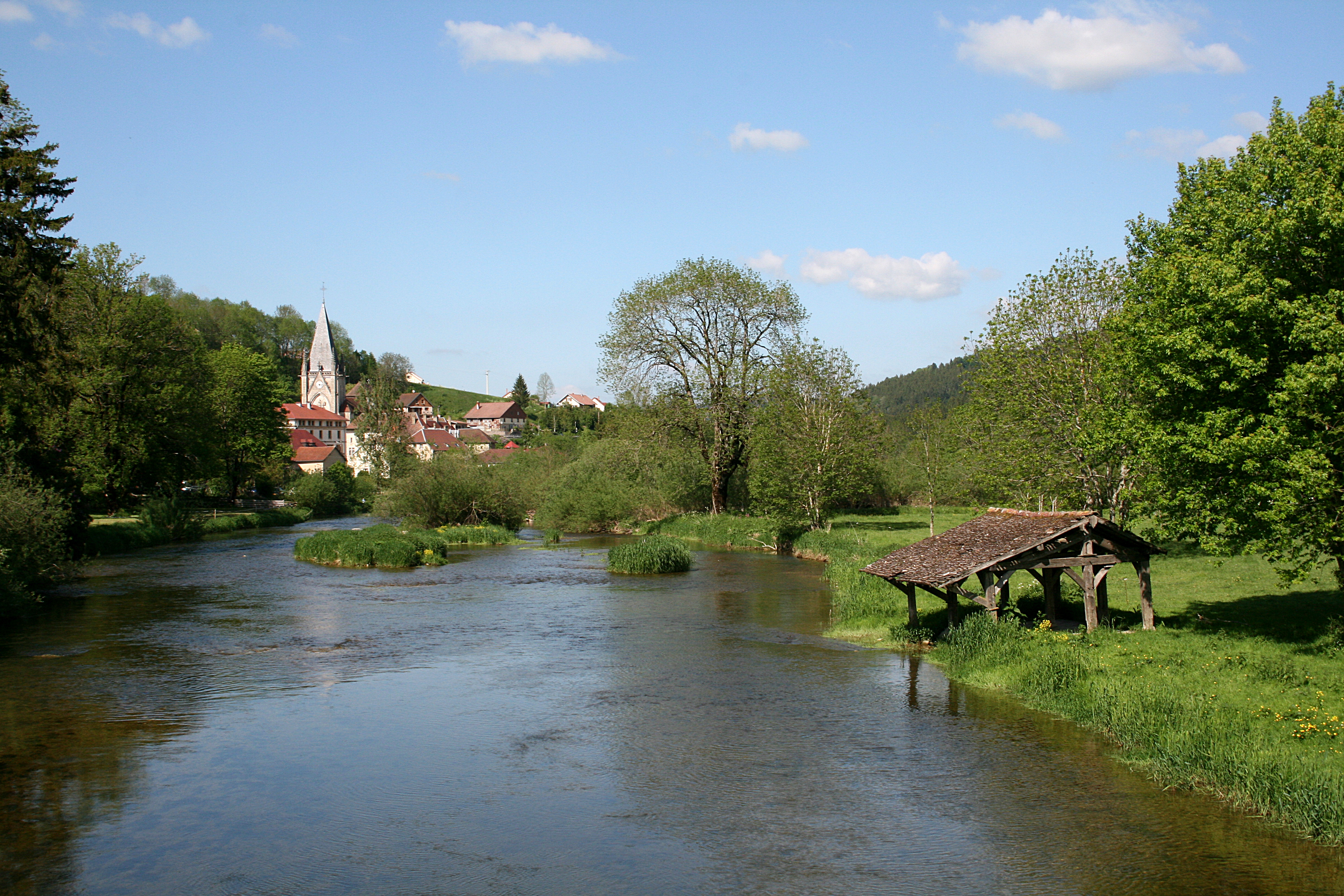
- The Doubs

- Coat of arms
- Location of Montbenoît
- Location within France Location within Bourgogne-Franche-Comté
- Coordinates: 46°59′37″N 6°27′46″E
- Country: France
- Region: Bourgogne-Franche-Comté
- Department: Doubs
- Arrondissement: Pontarlier
- Canton: Ornans
- Commune: Pays-de-Montbenoît
- Area^{1}: 5.03 km^{2} (1.94 sq mi)
- Elevation: 790 m (2,590 ft)
- Highest elevation: 1,125 m (3,691 ft)
- Lowest elevation: 762 m (2,500 ft)
- Population (2023): 402
  - Density: 79.9/km^{2} (207/sq mi)
- Time zone: UTC+01:00 (CET)
  - Summer (DST): UTC+02:00 (CEST)
- Postal code: 25650
- ^{1} French Land Register data, which excludes lakes, ponds, glaciers > 1 km^{2} (0.386 sq mi or 247 acres) and river estuaries.

Montbenoît (French pronunciation: [mɔ̃bənwa]; Arpitan: L’Abayie) is a former commune in the Doubs department in the Bourgogne-Franche-Comté region in eastern France. It was merged into the new commune Pays-de-Montbenoît on 1 January 2025.

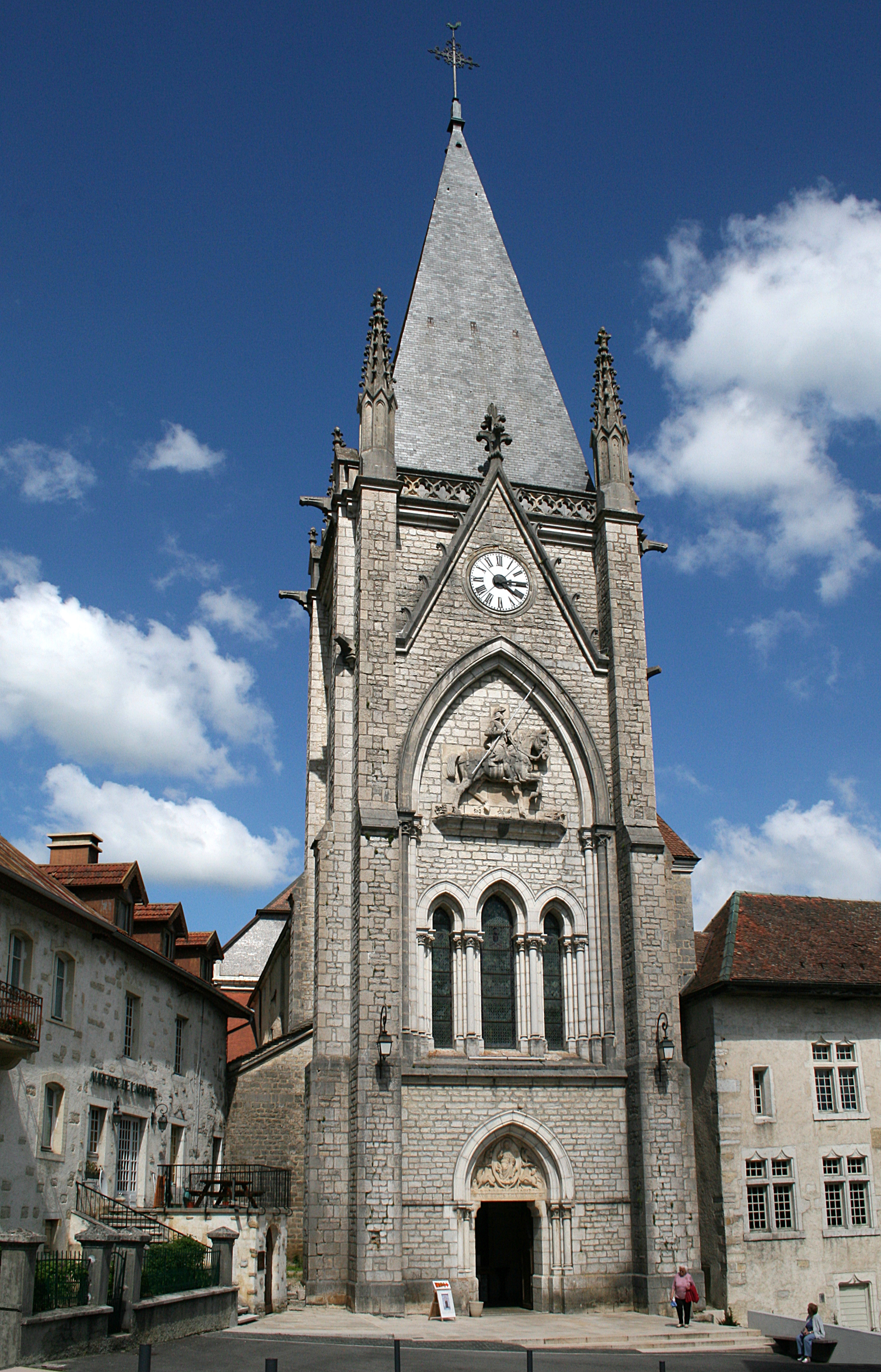
The abbey church (11th-20th centuries).

== Geography ==
The commune lies 14 km (8.7 mi) north of Pontarlier in the Jura Mountains.

== History ==
In the early 12th century, Landry, Lord of Joux, gave land in the upper Doubs valley to Humbert, Archbishop of Besançon, to found an abbey. The local summit in the area was at the time called Mont Benoît after a hermit named Benoît who lived there. Humbert invited monks to come from Valais and an abbey under St. Columbanus's rule was built by a monk called Nardouin (Norduin) in 1141–1142. The town grew up nearby the abbey. Both the abbey and the town were named Montbenoît after the local summit. The abbey later came under the Augustine rule.

In 1947, Montbenoît was proclaimed capital of the Republic of Saugeais by Georges Pourchet, a local hotel owner, who also created the republic on the spot.

== See also ==
- Communes of the Doubs department
