= Doubs (river) =

River in Switzerland and France

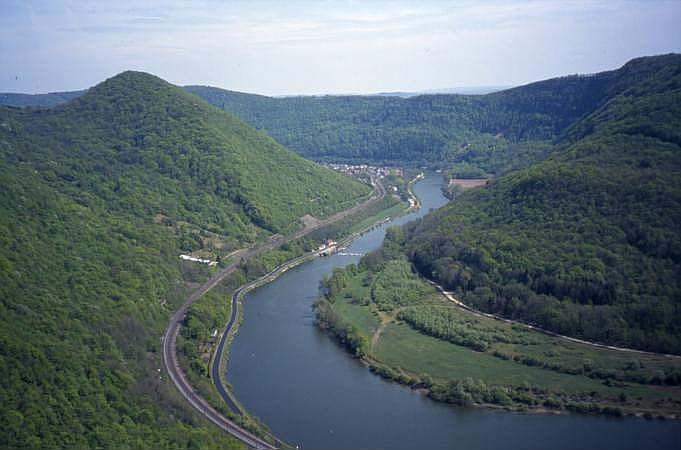
- The Doubs upstream of Besançon, amid richly-forested high hills

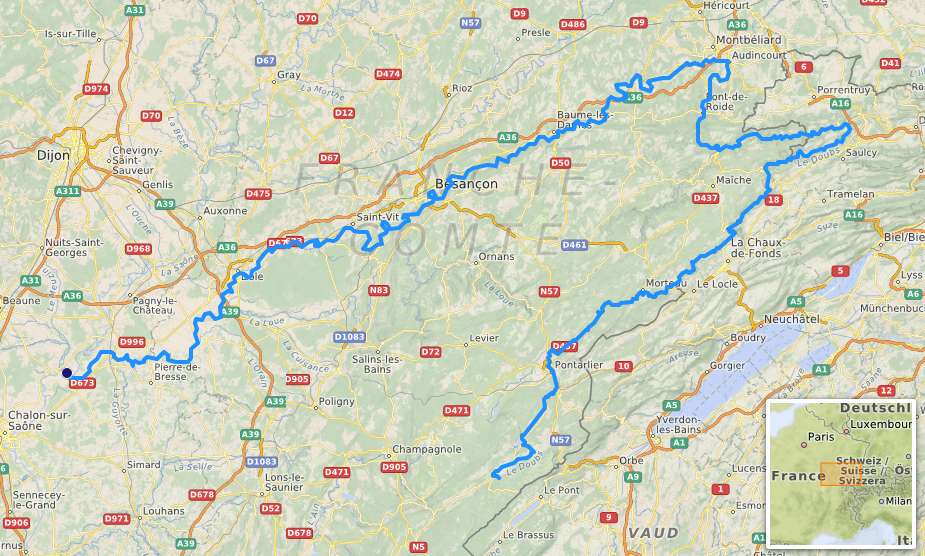
- Native name: Dubs (Arpitan)

Location
- Countries: France; Switzerland

Physical characteristics
- Source
  - location: Mouthe, Jura Mountains
  - coordinates: 46°42′17″N 6°12′34″E
  - elevation: 946 m (3,104 ft)
- Mouth
  - location: Saône
  - coordinates: 46°54′3″N 5°1′27″E
  - elevation: 175 m (574 ft)
- Length: 453 kilometres (281 mi)
- Basin size: 7,500 km^{2} (2,900 sq mi)
- Discharge
  - average: 176 m^{3}/s (6,200 cu ft/s)

Basin features
- Progression: Saône→ Rhône→ Mediterranean Sea
- Tributaries
  - left: Loue
  - right: Allan
- Lakes: Lac de Saint-Point, Lac des Brenets, Lac de Moron
- gender (masculine: preceded by le/du)

The Doubs (/duː/ doo; French: [du]; Arpitan: Dubs; German: Dub (obsolete)) is a 453-kilometre (281 mi) river in far eastern France which strays into western Switzerland. It is a left-bank tributary of the Saône. It rises near Mouthe in the western Jura Mountains, at 946 metres (3,104 ft) and its mouth is at Verdun-sur-le-Doubs, a village and commune in Saône-et-Loire at about 175 m (574 ft) above sea level. It is the tenth-longest river in France.

The most populous settlement of the basin lies on its banks, Besançon. Its course includes a small waterfall and a 4-kilometre (2.5 mi) narrow lake.

== Course ==
From its source in Mouthe, France, France it flows northeast, crossing the French/Swiss border at the very southwest of Soubey, Switzerland in the Swiss Canton of Jura. It continues northeasterly in Jura Canton for roughly 20km, then turns sharply north and then southwest to return to the border into France which it crosses at the very east of Montancy, France. South-east of Montbéliard, France it adopts a southwest striation or fault of the Jura Mountains, flowing a greater distance southwest than the flow it has traced before northeast. It then flows into the Saône at Verdun-sur-le-Doubs about 20 km (12 mi) northeast of Chalon-sur-Saône.

The shape of the course resembles the silhouette of a terrier sitting upright, leaning right, with the upper part of a northeastern corner "ear" the only zone in Switzerland, there reaching Saint-Ursanne. In that country it borders or crosses the cantons Jura and Neuchâtel.

== Waterfalls and lake ==
The falls known as the Saut du Doubs is on the French-Swiss border.

Nearby, the river, dammed up by landslide debris, forms the 4-kilometre (2.5 mi) long, 200-metre (660 ft) wide, winding lake, (le) Lac des Brenets. The 27-metre (89 ft)-high Doubs Falls are at the lake's end. The falls can be reached on foot or by passenger boat.

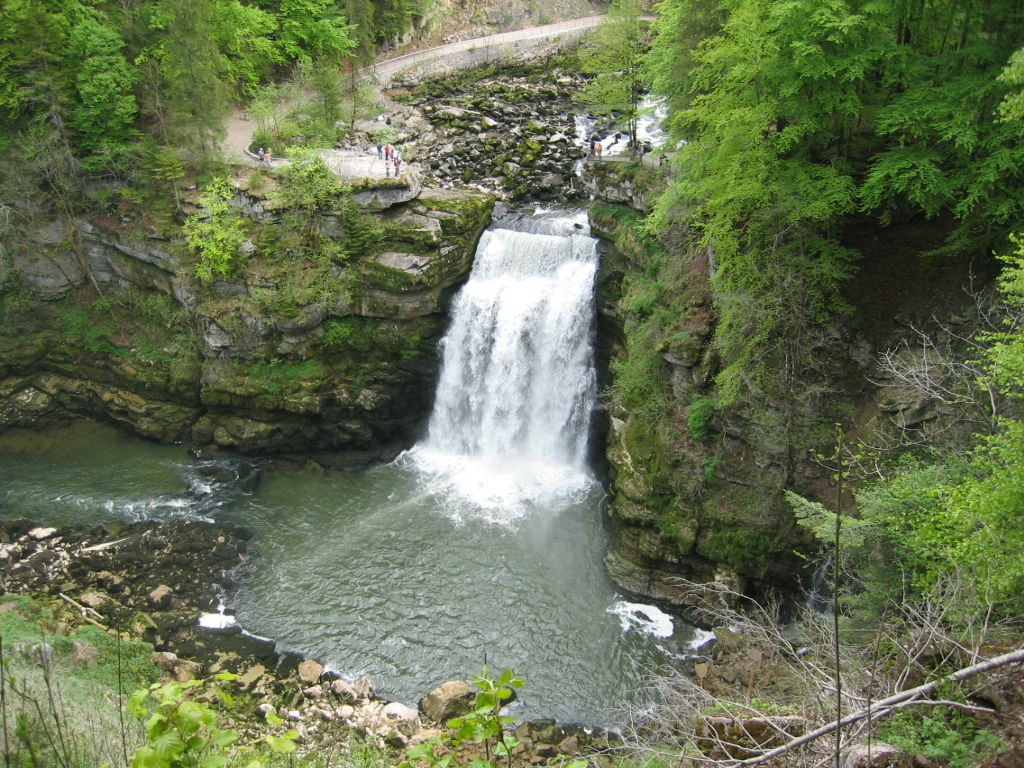
The Saut du Doubs

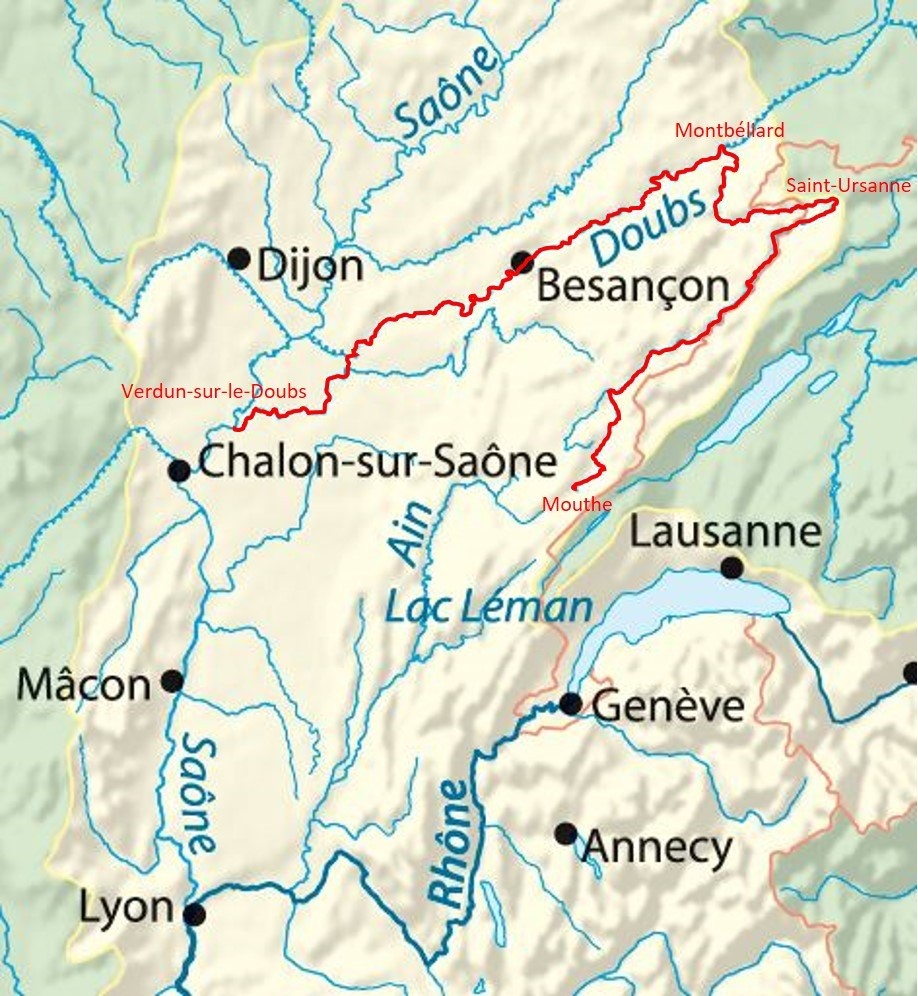
Course of the Doubs

The Doubs flows through the following Departments of France, Cantons of Switzerland, and cities:

- Doubs (F): Pontarlier
- Neuchâtel (CH)
- Jura (CH): Saint-Ursanne
- Doubs (F): Montbéliard, Besançon
- Jura (F): Dole
- Saône-et-Loire (F): Verdun-sur-le-Doubs

Tributaries include:

- Loue
- Dessoubre
- Allan

The river forms several lakes:

- Lac de Saint-Point (elevation 850 m or 2,790 ft) near Pontarlier
- Lac des Brenets (elevation 750 metres or 2,460 feet)
- Lac de Moron (elevation 716 metres or 2,349 feet)
- Lac de Biaufond (elevation 610 metres or 2,000 feet)

Between Ville du Pont and Morteau the river flows through the Défilé d'Entre-Roches, a scenic canyon.

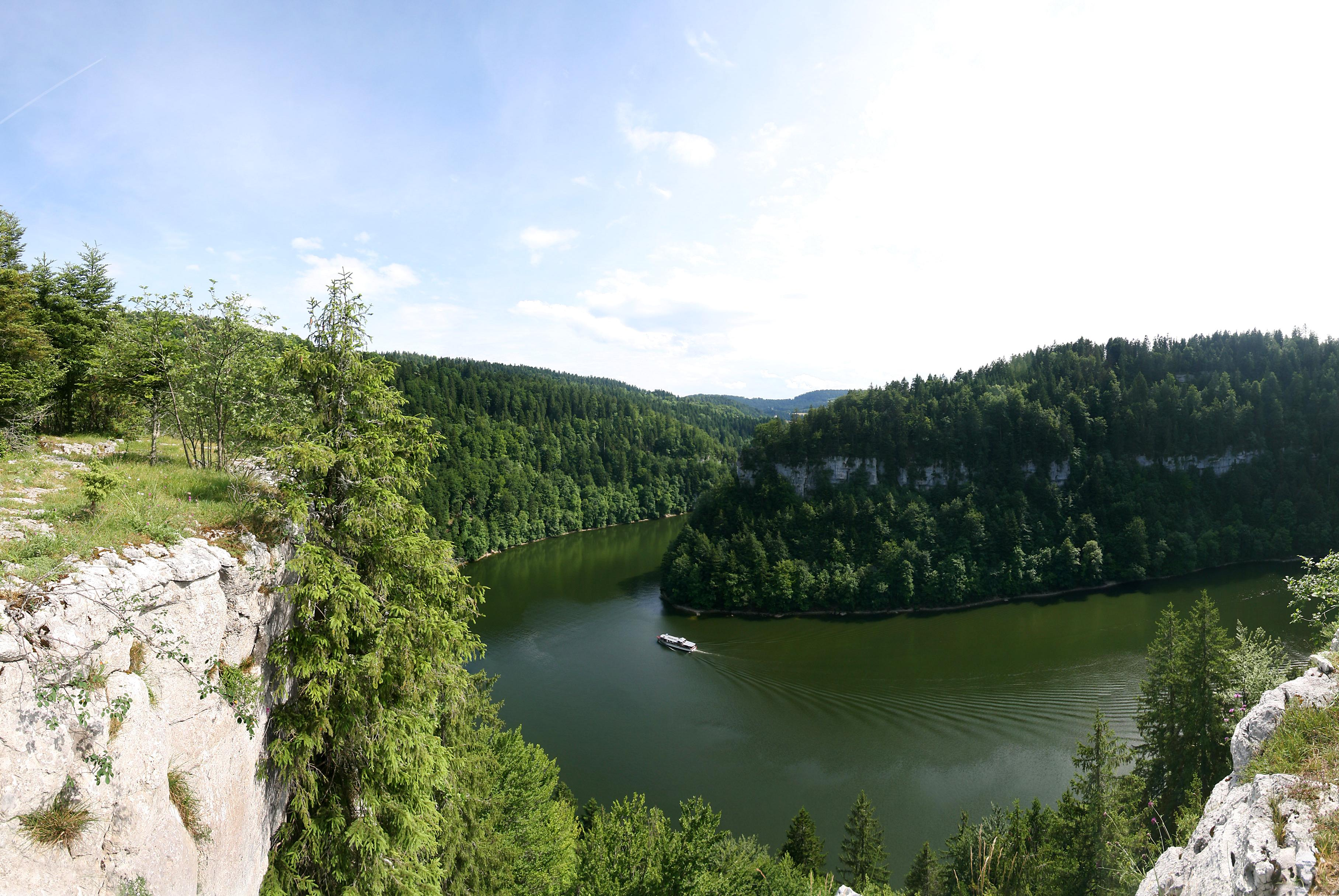
The Lac de Brenets

== Floods and seasonal variation ==
The rate of flow of the Doubs is very seasonally variable. The flooding or well-watered season can stretch from September to May, caused by heavy rains or by quick melting of snow from the Jura mountains. At its mouth, the discharge rate can vary from as low as 20 cubic metres per second (710 cu ft/s) to over 1,000 cubic metres per second (35,000 cu ft/s) during floods.

In Besançon, the largest floods have been in 1852 (8.5 metres or 27 feet 11 inches), in 1896 (7.96 metres or 26 feet 1 inch) and in 1910.

== Hydroelectricity ==
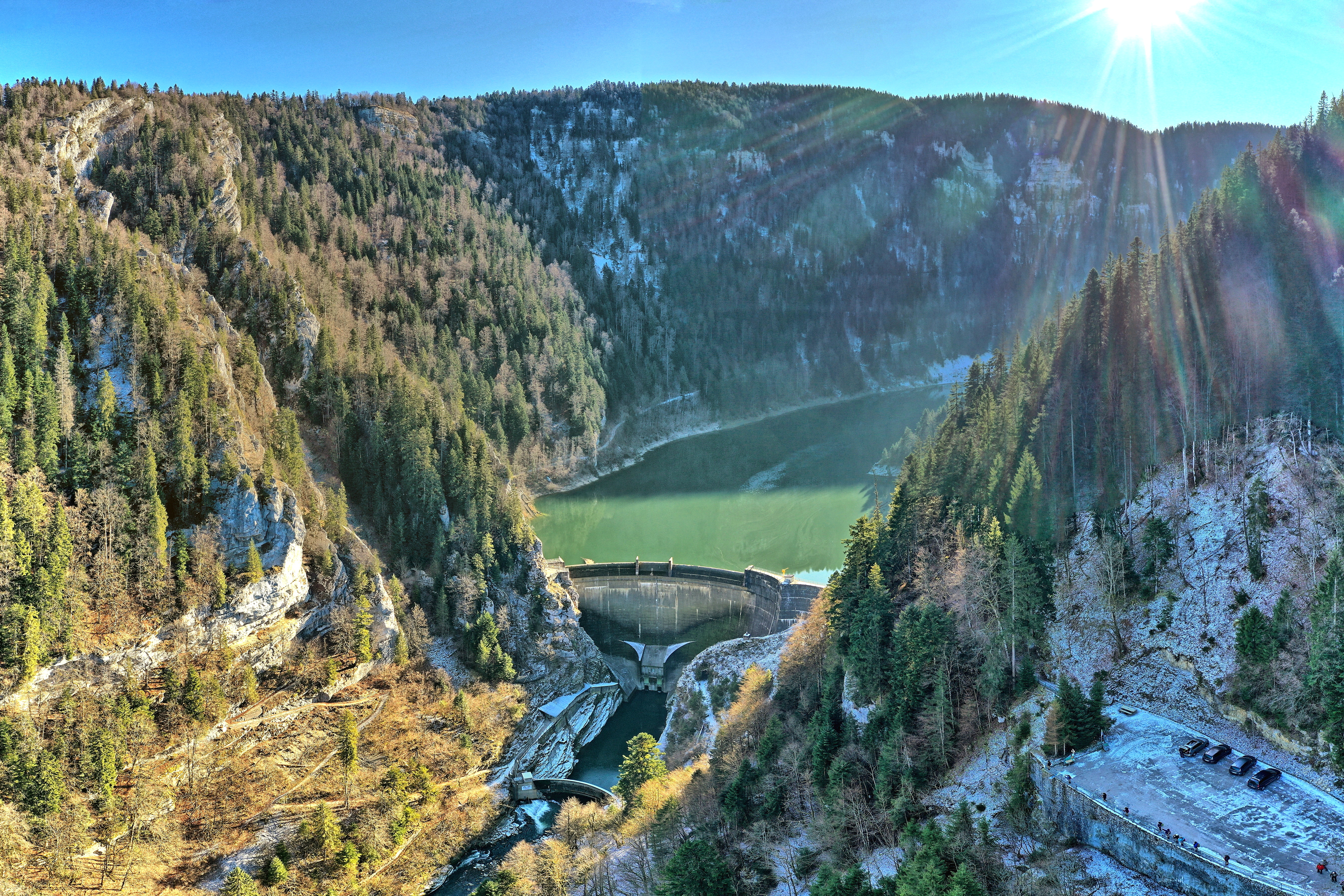
The Dam of Châtelot, completed in 1953

As a mountain river with substantial discharge, the Doubs has been used for electricity generation. Among several hydroelectric stations, the most important are the Dam of Châtelot, 74 metres (243 ft) tall, and the Dam of Refrain, 66.5 metres (218 ft) tall.

== In popular culture ==
The river is mentioned sixteen times in Stendhal's novel The Red and the Black (Le rouge et le noir).

== See also ==
- January 1910 Doubs river flood
- List of rivers in France
- List of rivers in Switzerland
- Nature parks in Switzerland
- Sommêtres
