= Val-d'Usiers =

Commune in Doubs, France

- Commune
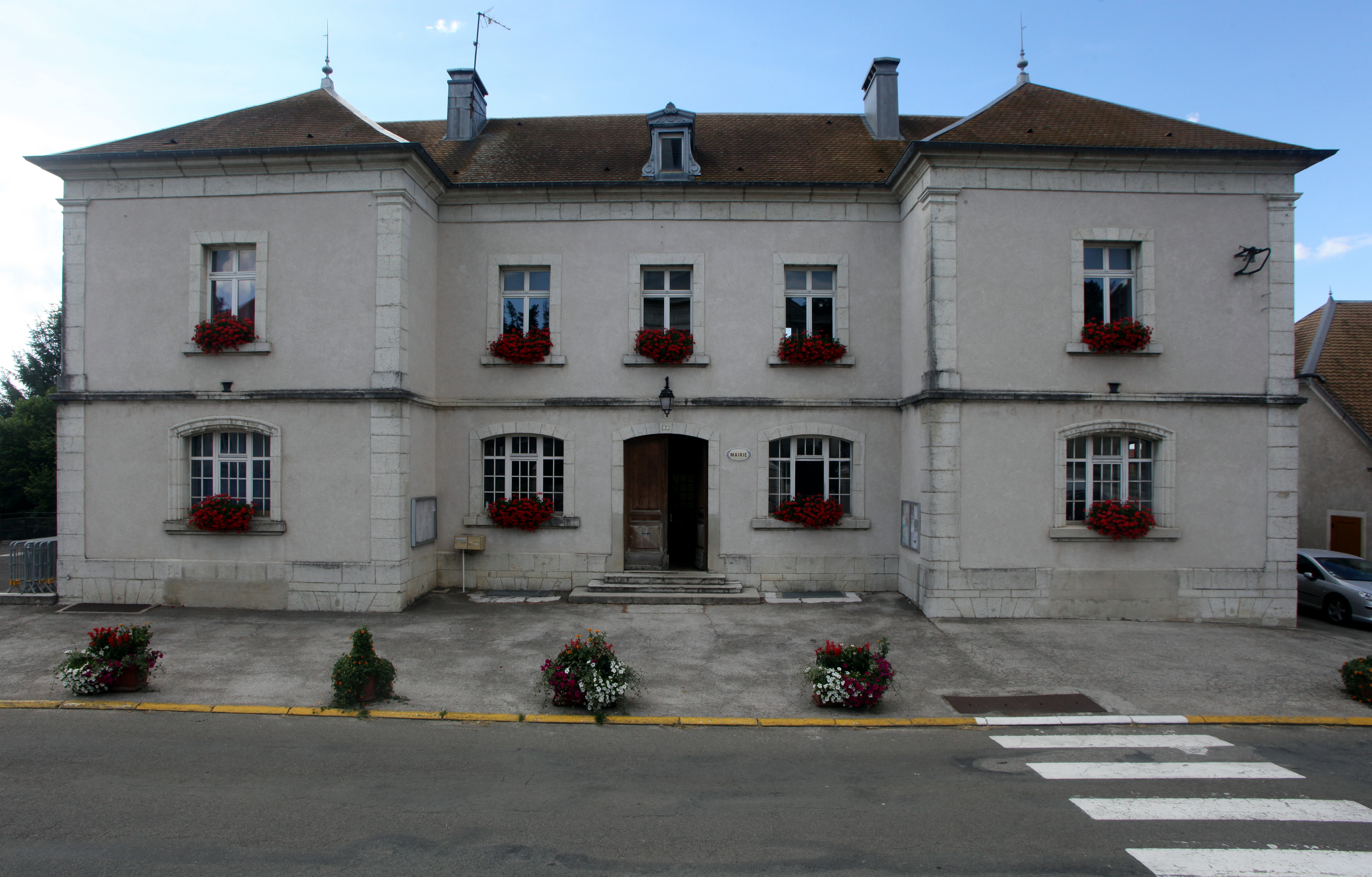
- The town hall in Val-d'Usiers
- Location of Val-d'Usiers
- Location within France Location within Bourgogne-Franche-Comté
- Coordinates: 46°57′47″N 6°16′05″E
- Country: France
- Region: Bourgogne-Franche-Comté
- Department: Doubs
- Arrondissement: Pontarlier
- Canton: Ornans
- Intercommunality: Altitude 800

Government
  - Mayor (2024–2026): Aurélien Dornier
- Area^{1}: 50.94 km^{2} (19.67 sq mi)
- Highest elevation: 922 m (3,025 ft)
- Lowest elevation: 650 m (2,130 ft)
- Population (2023): 2,132
  - Density: 41.85/km^{2} (108.4/sq mi)
- Time zone: UTC+01:00 (CET)
  - Summer (DST): UTC+02:00 (CEST)
- INSEE/Postal code: 25060 /25520
- ^{1} French Land Register data, which excludes lakes, ponds, glaciers > 1 km^{2} (0.386 sq mi or 247 acres) and river estuaries.

Val-d'Usiers (French pronunciation: [val dyzje]) is a commune in the Doubs department in the Bourgogne-Franche-Comté region in eastern France. It was established on 1 January 2024, with the merger of the communes of Bians-les-Usiers, Goux-les-Usiers et Sombacour. Its seat is Bians-les-Usiers.

== History ==
A prefectural decree of 27 September 2023 announced the merger of Bians-les-Usiers, Goux-les-Usiers and Sombacour under the new commune of Val d'Usiers on 1 January 2024. A new decree of 15 December 2023 made a correction to the name of the municipality which became Val-d'Usiers, albeit with a hyphen. The section of the commune of Pissenavache, attached to the old commune of Bians-les-Usiers, also became a section of the new commune.

== Geography ==
The new commune of Val-d'Usiers is located in the south of the Doubs department, in the small agricultural region of the upper Jura plateaus. It is located 36.7 km (22.8 mi) from Besançon, the prefecture of the department, 9 km (5.6 mi) from the sub-prefecture Pontarlier, and 18.8 km (11.7 mi) from Ornans, capital of the canton of Ornans, in which Val-d'Usiers has depended on since its creation. The commune is also part of the Pontarlier living area. The closest communes are Évillers (4.5 km), Ouhans (4.5 km), Vuillecin (5.3 km), Chaffois (5.5 km), Septfontaines (6.6 km), Dommartin (6 .7 km), Houtaud (6.7 km), Bugny (7.3 km) and Chapelle-d'Huin (8.4 km).

=== Geology and relief ===
The area of Val-d'Usiers is 50.94 km^{2} (19.67 sq mi). The altitude of the commune varies from 650 m (2,130 ft) to 922 m (3,025 ft).

== Population ==
Population data refer to the commune in its geography as of January 2025.

Historical population
Year	Pop.	±% p.a.
1968	1,394	—
1975	1,426	+0.32%
1982	1,562	+1.31%
1990	1,596	+0.27%
1999	1,594	−0.01%
2007	1,766	+1.29%
2012	1,936	+1.86%
2017	2,047	+1.12%
2023	2,132	+0.68%
Source: INSEE

== See also ==
- Communes of the Doubs department
