= Battle of Pontarlier =

- Part of Franco-Prussian War
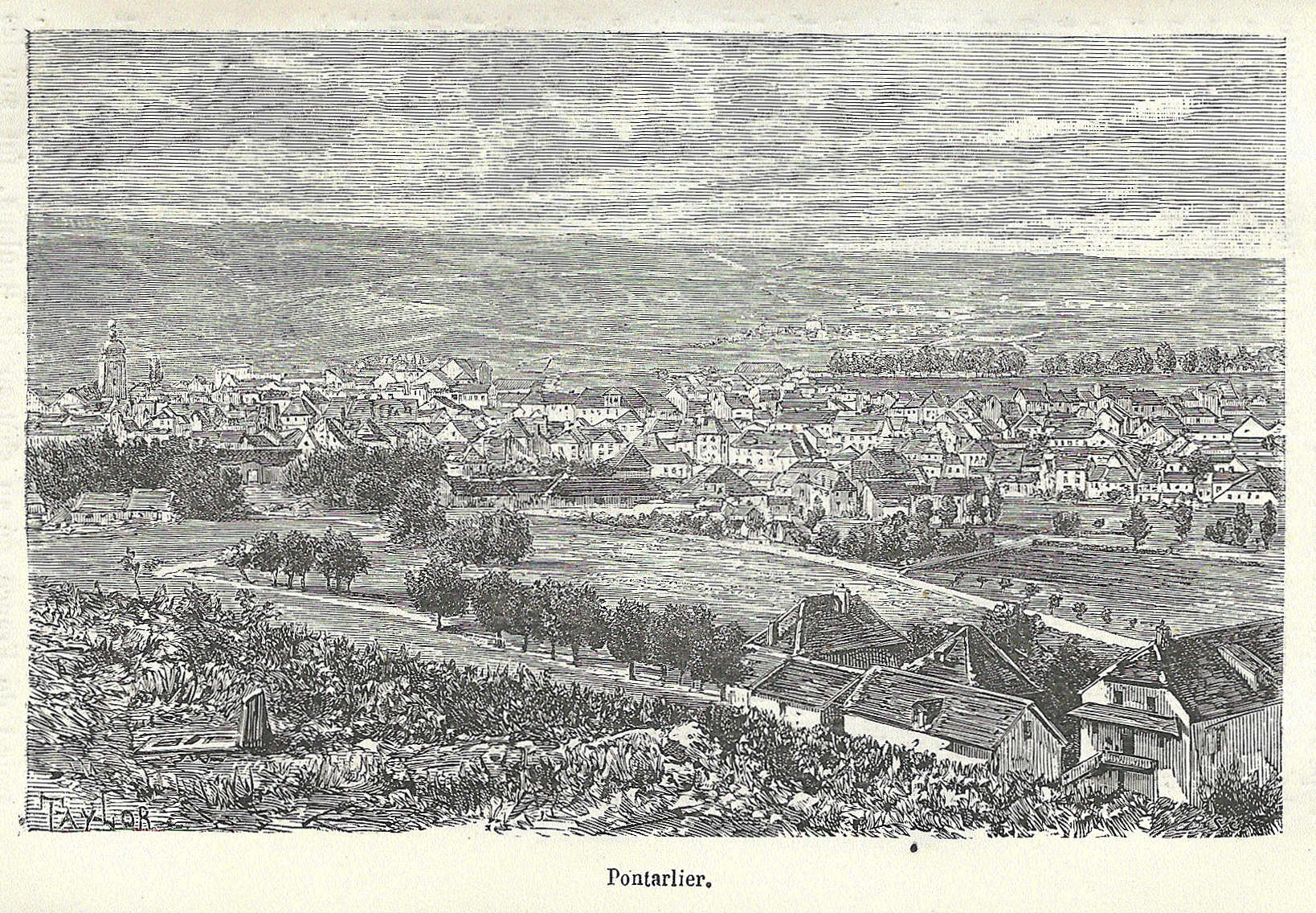
- Pontarlier in 1878
Date	29 January – 2 February 1871
Location	Pontarlier, Doubs, France 46.917985°N 6.358686°E
Result	German Victory

Belligerents
French Republic	German Empire

Commanders and leaders
Justin Clinchant	Edwin von Manteuffel

Units involved
Eastern Army	Army of the South

Casualties and losses
15,000 troops captured (among them 2 generals), 10 artillery pieces and mitrailleuse machine guns, a large amount of ammunition and weapons were seized	19 officers and 365 soldiers killed

The Battle of Pontarlier, also known as the Battle of Pontarlier-La Cluse, was the final military operation of the Franco-Prussian War, that took place from 29 January to 2 February 1871, near Pontarlier and La Cluse-et-Mijoux, not long after the newly formed German Empire and French Republic had a ceasefire. During these engagements, the German Army of the South, under the command of Lieutenant General Edwin von Manteuffel won over the French Eastern Army under the command of General Justin Clinchant, the battle forced the French Eastern Army to withdraw to neutral Switzerland. The strong efforts of the German armies led by General August von Werder in The previous Battle of the Lisaine, as well as that of General Von Manteuffel's armies at the Battle of Pontarlier, resulted in the collapse of the assault on southern Germany which the Eastern Army had expected to be ruined. At the same time, the defeat of the Eastern Army finally forced the French Interior Minister Léon Gambetta to end resistance to the Germans. The defeat at Pontarlier also brought the French heavy losses, including a large number of soldiers being taken prisoner.

== Background ==
At December 1870, the French minister Charles-Denis Bourbaki was commanding the Eastern Army and march to Belfort to relieve the fortress. However, the German general August von Werder thwarted Bourbaki's attack at the Battle of the Lisaine in early 1871. On 22 January 1871 Bourbaki and his weary army withdrew to Besançon. Another German army under General Von Manteuffel also appeared and the French Eastern Army was in danger of being caught between the two German armies. The situation forced Bourbaki to retreat to Pontarlier as the only way. Feeling the disgrace of his army, the ill-fated general handed over command of the corps to General Clinchant on 24 January, after which he shot himself in the head but did not die. That same day, in their swift eastward march, Manteuffel's forces crossed the Doubs and captured the canyons of the Swiss border to close the siege with Werder. Meanwhile, Clinchant had made the retreat of all his legions to Pontarlier, and was followed closely behind by Manteuffel. And, on 29 January, Manteuffel launched a general offensive: that afternoon, the midfield force of the German 14th Division defeated the French rear at Sombacourt and Chaffois and repelled the French to Pontarlier. On the same day, the midfielders of the 2nd German Army engaged a French army near Les Planches to cover the way that Clinchant could make the crossing into Switzerland. The French were again defeated, but the consequences of this defeat were mitigated when Manteuffel ordered the 2nd Army to turn to Frasne. The exhaustion of the French forces made it impossible for Clinchant to consider fleeing south if possible. After a full day of fighting, on 30 January, the German 2nd Army attacked Frasne and defeated the French, driving the French further away.

== The Battle ==
That day, information about the armistice agreement between the two countries on 28 January enabled Clinchant to enter the negotiation phase, but Manteuffel did not accept. But in a fierce battle on 31 January, he captured the roads at St. Marie, in the mountains south of Pontarlier. By the middle of 1 February 1871, the German army was ready to launch an attack on Pontarlier. At the beginning of the day, General Clinchant signed an agreement with the Commander-in-Chief of the Swiss Army under which his army was allowed to cross the border and disarm in Switzerland. The retreat was made after the agreement was finalized, and in the afternoon, a brigade commanded by Du Trossel of the 2nd North German Army successfully attacked the town. The French army suffered heavy losses. After this victory, Du Trossel pursued the enemy across the pass and to the fortresses of Larmont and Joux, where the Germans were delayed. The last French resistance finally withdrew, the retreat to Switzerland was a great disaster for the French army. The intense marches and battles of Von Manteuffel's three-week campaign brought him an important victory. It also shows the season of the German army under the ingenious and daring command.
