= Doubs (disambiguation) =

Doubs may refer to:

- Doubs (river) [du], a river in France and Switzerland
- Doubs (department) [du], a department of France
- Doubs, Doubs [du], a municipality in this department
- Romeo Doubs (born 2000), American football player
