= Bians-les-Usiers =

- Part of Val-d'Usiers
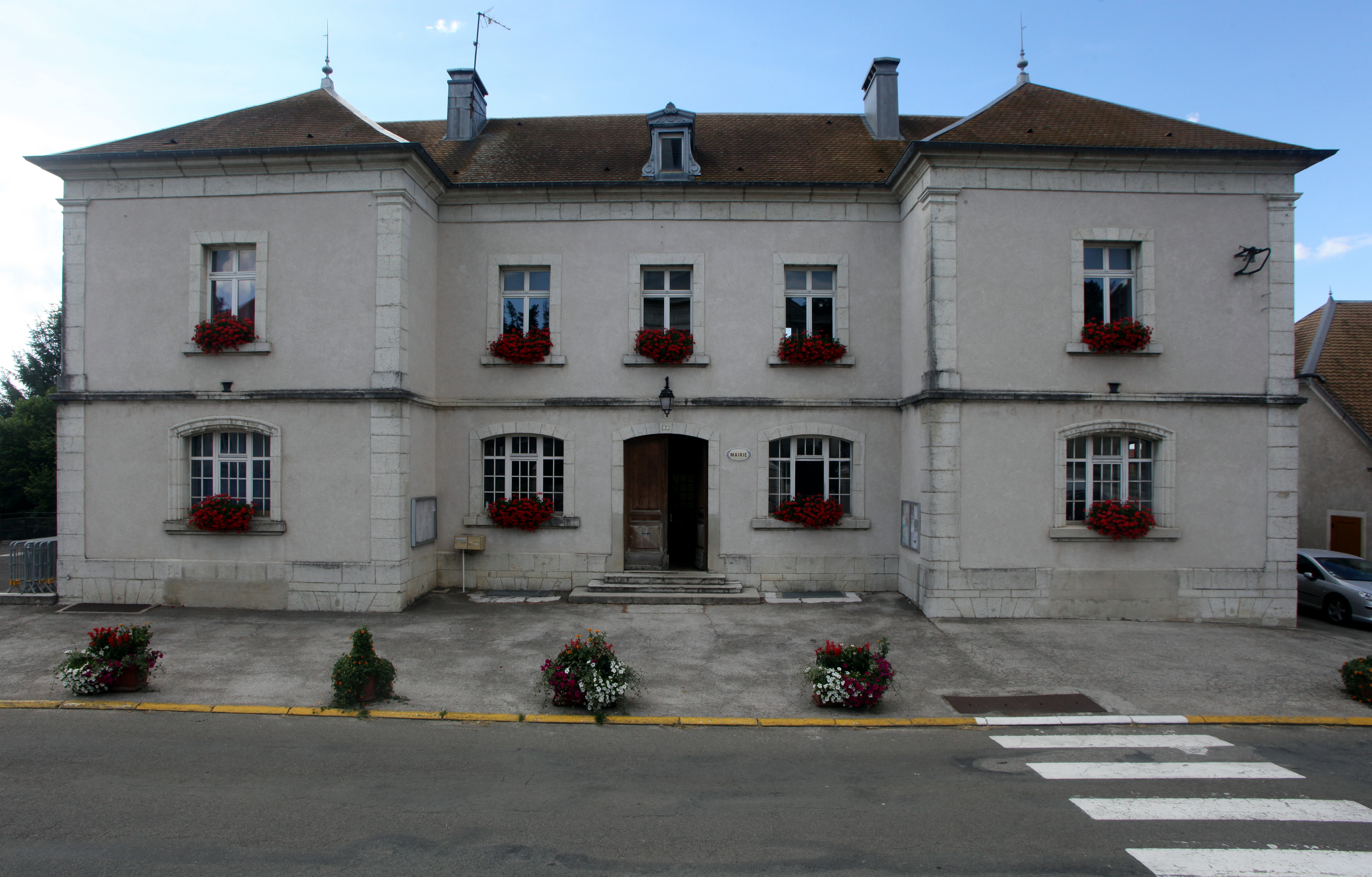
- The town hall in Bians-les-Usiers
- Location of Bians-les-Usiers
- Location within France Location within Bourgogne-Franche-Comté
- Coordinates: 46°57′47″N 6°16′05″E
- Country: France
- Region: Bourgogne-Franche-Comté
- Department: Doubs
- Arrondissement: Pontarlier
- Canton: Ornans
- Commune: Val-d'Usiers
- Area^{1}: 14.01 km^{2} (5.41 sq mi)
- Highest elevation: 922 m (3,025 ft)
- Lowest elevation: 700 m (2,300 ft)
- Population (2021): 694
  - Density: 49.5/km^{2} (128/sq mi)
- Time zone: UTC+01:00 (CET)
  - Summer (DST): UTC+02:00 (CEST)
- Postal code: 25520
- ^{1} French Land Register data, which excludes lakes, ponds, glaciers > 1 km^{2} (0.386 sq mi or 247 acres) and river estuaries.

Bians-les-Usiers (French pronunciation: [bjɑ̃ lez‿yzje]) is a former commune in the Doubs department in the Bourgogne-Franche-Comté region in eastern France. It merged with Goux-les-Usiers and Sombacour to form the new commune of Val-d'Usiers on 1 January 2024.

== Population ==
Historical population
Year	Pop.	±% p.a.
1968	399	—
1975	402	+0.11%
1982	476	+2.44%
1990	517	+1.04%
1999	529	+0.26%
2009	576	+0.85%
2014	640	+2.13%
2020	699	+1.48%
Source: INSEE

== See also ==
- Communes of the Doubs department
