= Goux-les-Usiers =

- Part of Val-d'Usiers
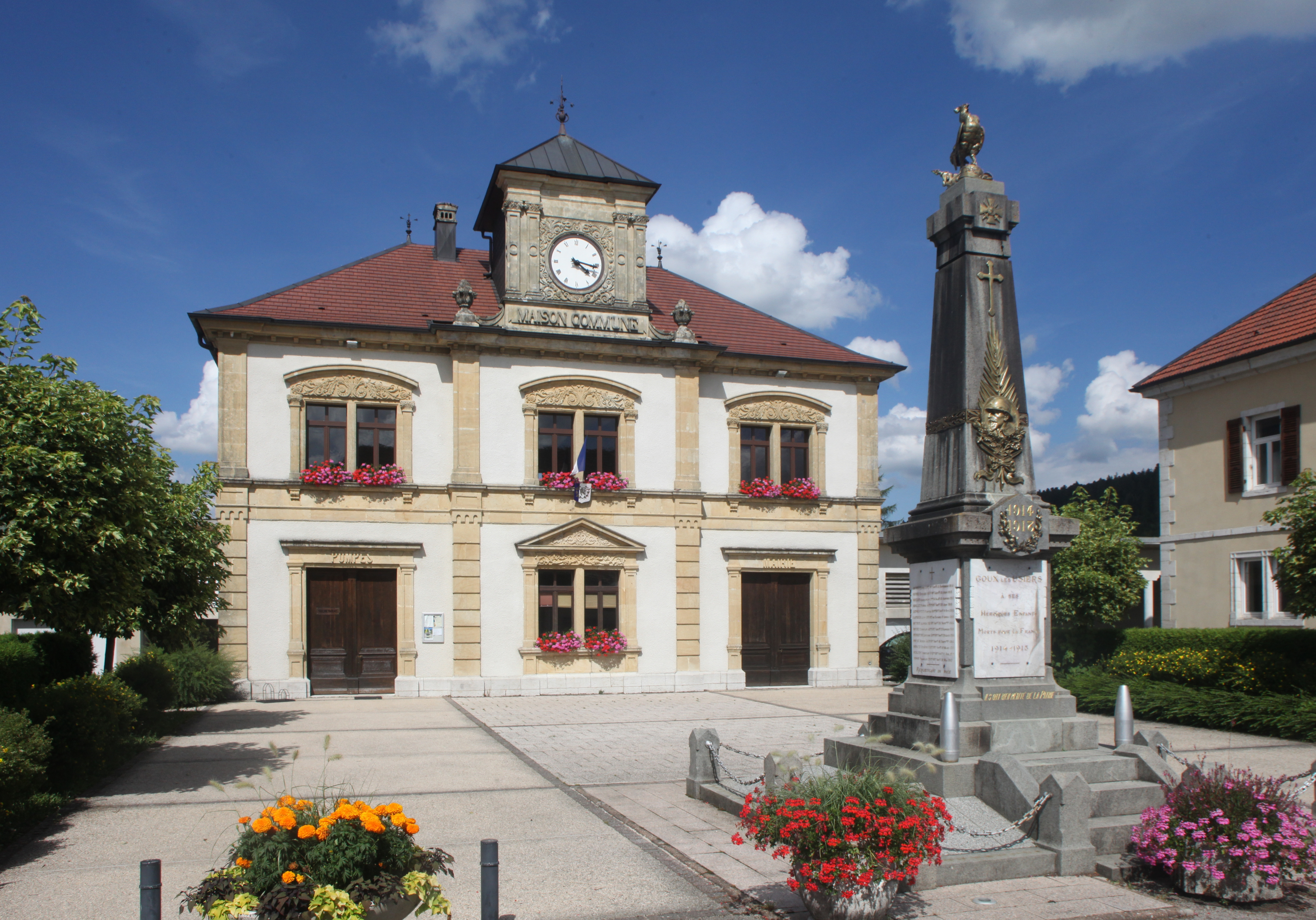
- The town hall in Goux-les-Usiers

- Coat of arms
- Location of Goux-les-Usiers
- Location within France Location within Bourgogne-Franche-Comté
- Coordinates: 46°58′20″N 6°16′43″E
- Country: France
- Region: Bourgogne-Franche-Comté
- Department: Doubs
- Arrondissement: Pontarlier
- Canton: Ornans
- Commune: Val-d'Usiers
- Area^{1}: 17.63 km^{2} (6.81 sq mi)
- Highest elevation: 921 m (3,022 ft)
- Lowest elevation: 650 m (2,130 ft)
- Population (2021): 791
  - Density: 44.9/km^{2} (116/sq mi)
- Time zone: UTC+01:00 (CET)
  - Summer (DST): UTC+02:00 (CEST)
- Postal code: 25520
- ^{1} French Land Register data, which excludes lakes, ponds, glaciers > 1 km^{2} (0.386 sq mi or 247 acres) and river estuaries.

Goux-les-Usiers (French pronunciation: [ɡu lez‿yzje]) is a former commune in the Doubs department in the Bourgogne-Franche-Comté region in eastern France. It merged with Bians-les-Usiers and Sombacour to form the new commune of Val-d'Usiers on 1 January 2024.

== Population ==
Historical population
Year	Pop.	±% p.a.
1968	532	—
1975	560	+0.74%
1982	574	+0.35%
1990	565	−0.20%
1999	541	−0.48%
2009	681	+2.33%
2014	724	+1.23%
2020	781	+1.27%
Source: INSEE

== See also ==
- Communes of the Doubs department
