= Granges-Narboz =

- Commune
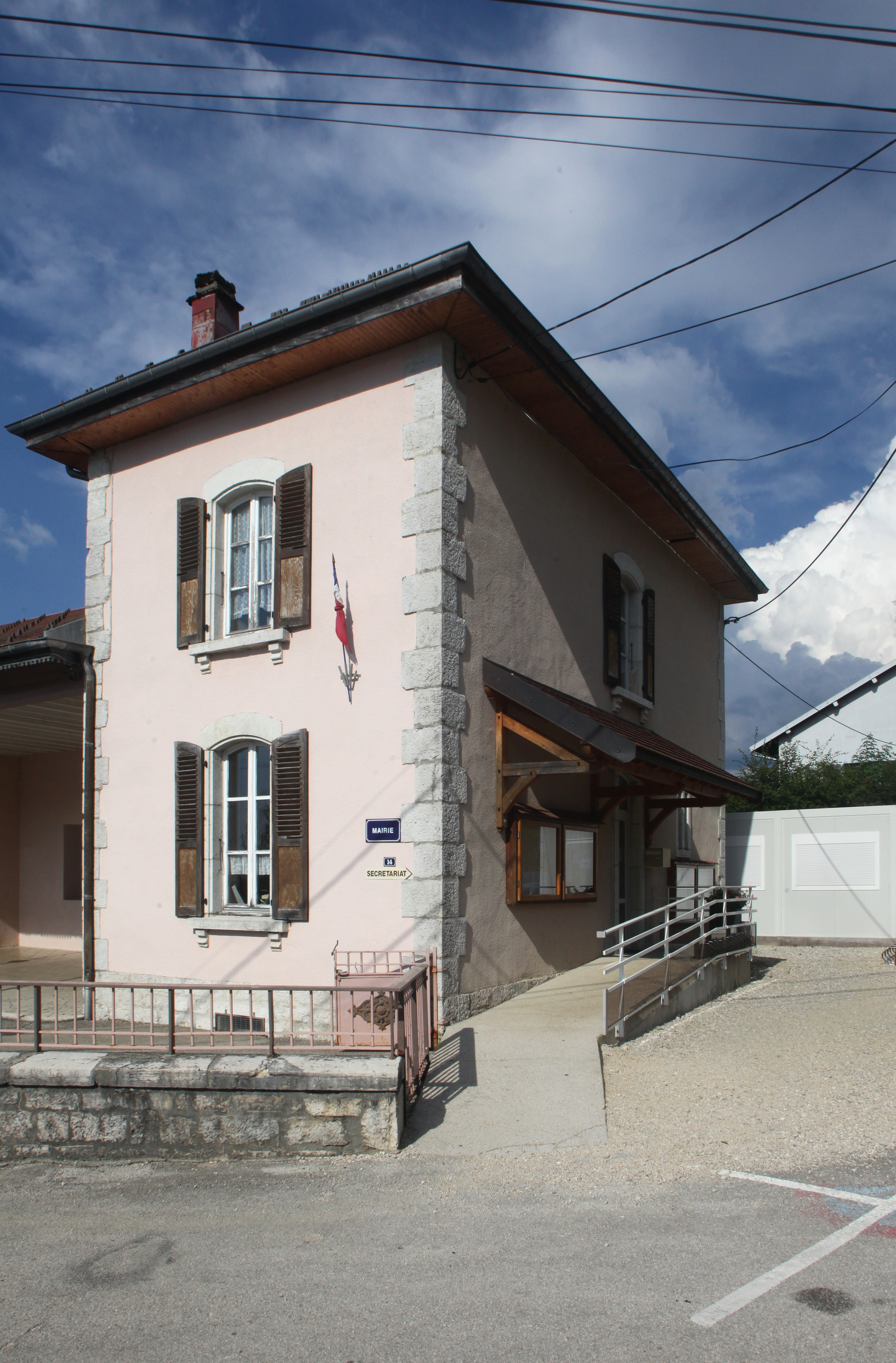
- The town hall in Granges-Narboz

- Coat of arms
- Location of Granges-Narboz
- Location within France Location within Bourgogne-Franche-Comté
- Coordinates: 46°52′48″N 6°18′41″E
- Country: France
- Region: Bourgogne-Franche-Comté
- Department: Doubs
- Arrondissement: Pontarlier
- Canton: Pontarlier

Government
  - Mayor (2020–2026): Raphaël Charmier
- Area^{1}: 16.22 km^{2} (6.26 sq mi)
- Highest elevation: 1,025 m (3,363 ft)
- Lowest elevation: 808 m (2,651 ft)
- Population (2023): 1,359
  - Density: 83.79/km^{2} (217.0/sq mi)
- Time zone: UTC+01:00 (CET)
  - Summer (DST): UTC+02:00 (CEST)
- INSEE/Postal code: 25293 /25300
- ^{1} French Land Register data, which excludes lakes, ponds, glaciers > 1 km^{2} (0.386 sq mi or 247 acres) and river estuaries.

Granges-Narboz (French pronunciation: [ɡʁɑ̃ʒ naʁbo]; Arpitan: Les Granges de la forêt noire) is a commune in the Doubs department in the Bourgogne-Franche-Comté region in eastern France.

== Population ==
Historical population
Year	Pop.	±% p.a.
1968	249	—
1975	401	+7.04%
1982	434	+1.14%
1990	519	+2.26%
1999	627	+2.12%
2007	723	+1.80%
2012	1,018	+7.08%
2017	1,226	+3.79%
2023	1,359	+1.73%
Source: INSEE

== See also ==
- Communes of the Doubs department
