= Verrières-de-Joux =

- Commune
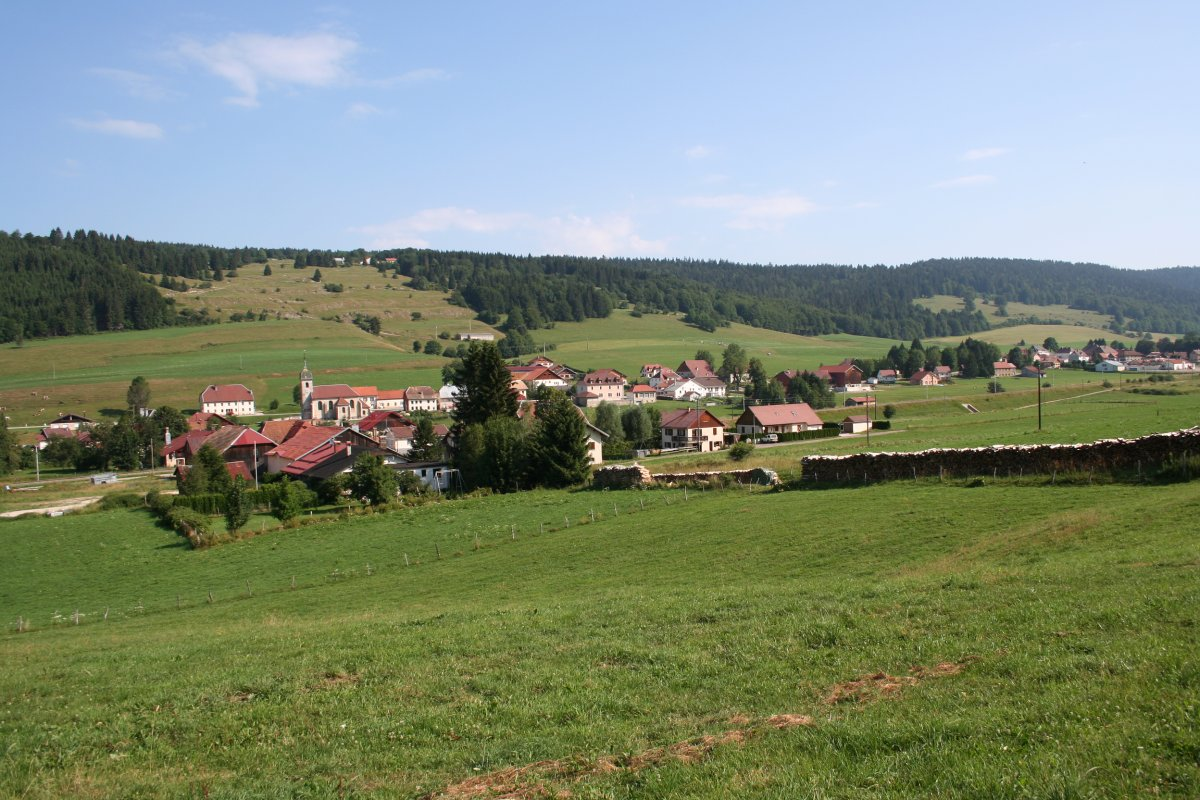
- A general view of Verrières-de-Joux

- Coat of arms
- Location of Verrières-de-Joux
- Location within France Location within Bourgogne-Franche-Comté
- Coordinates: 46°53′51″N 6°26′59″E
- Country: France
- Region: Bourgogne-Franche-Comté
- Department: Doubs
- Arrondissement: Pontarlier
- Canton: Pontarlier
- Intercommunality: Grand Pontarlier

Government
  - Mayor (2020–2026): Jean-Luc Faivre
- Area^{1}: 10.15 km^{2} (3.92 sq mi)
- Highest elevation: 1,204 m (3,950 ft)
- Lowest elevation: 890 m (2,920 ft)
- Population (2023): 464
  - Density: 45.7/km^{2} (118/sq mi)
- Time zone: UTC+01:00 (CET)
  - Summer (DST): UTC+02:00 (CEST)
- INSEE/Postal code: 25609 /25300
- ^{1} French Land Register data, which excludes lakes, ponds, glaciers > 1 km^{2} (0.386 sq mi or 247 acres) and river estuaries.

Verrières-de-Joux (French pronunciation: [vɛʁjɛʁ də ʒu]) is a commune in the Doubs department in the Bourgogne-Franche-Comté region in eastern France.

== Population ==
Historical population
Year	Pop.	±% p.a.
1968	417	—
1975	389	−0.99%
1982	375	−0.52%
1990	396	+0.68%
1999	355	−1.21%
2007	429	+2.39%
2012	414	−0.71%
2017	450	+1.68%
2023	464	+0.51%
Source: INSEE

== See also ==
- Communes of the Doubs department
