= Sombacour =

- Part of Val-d'Usiers
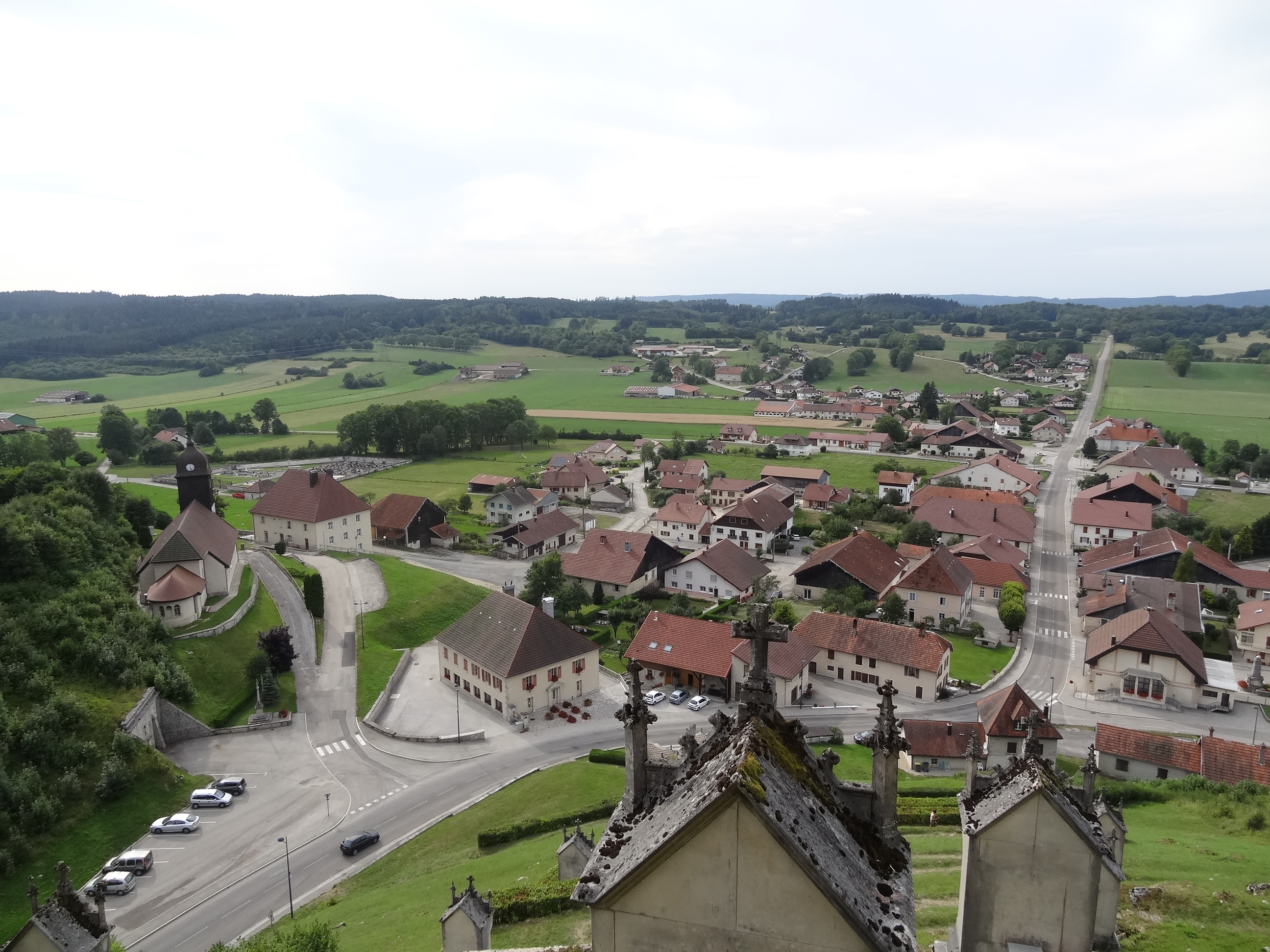
- A general view of Sombacour

- Coat of arms
- Location of Sombacour
- Location within France Location within Bourgogne-Franche-Comté
- Coordinates: 46°57′15″N 6°15′28″E
- Country: France
- Region: Bourgogne-Franche-Comté
- Department: Doubs
- Arrondissement: Pontarlier
- Canton: Ornans
- Commune: Val-d'Usiers
- Area^{1}: 19.3 km^{2} (7.5 sq mi)
- Highest elevation: 907 m (2,976 ft)
- Lowest elevation: 715 m (2,346 ft)
- Population (2021): 629
  - Density: 32.6/km^{2} (84.4/sq mi)
- Time zone: UTC+01:00 (CET)
  - Summer (DST): UTC+02:00 (CEST)
- Postal code: 25520
- ^{1} French Land Register data, which excludes lakes, ponds, glaciers > 1 km^{2} (0.386 sq mi or 247 acres) and river estuaries.

Sombacour (French pronunciation: [sɔ̃bakuʁ]) is a former commune in the Doubs department in the Bourgogne-Franche-Comté region in eastern France. It merged with Bians-les-Usiers and Goux-les-Usiers to form the new commune of Val-d'Usiers on 1 January 2024.

== Geography ==
Sombacour lies 12 km (7.5 mi) northeast of Levier.

== Population ==
Historical population
Year	Pop.	±% p.a.
1968	463	—
1975	464	+0.03%
1982	512	+1.42%
1990	514	+0.05%
1999	524	+0.21%
2009	588	+1.16%
2014	615	+0.90%
2020	632	+0.46%
Source: INSEE

== See also ==
- Communes of the Doubs department
