= Fort de Joux =

French castle

- Château de Joux
- Part of Maginot Line
- La Cluse-et-Mijoux; Near Pontarlier in France
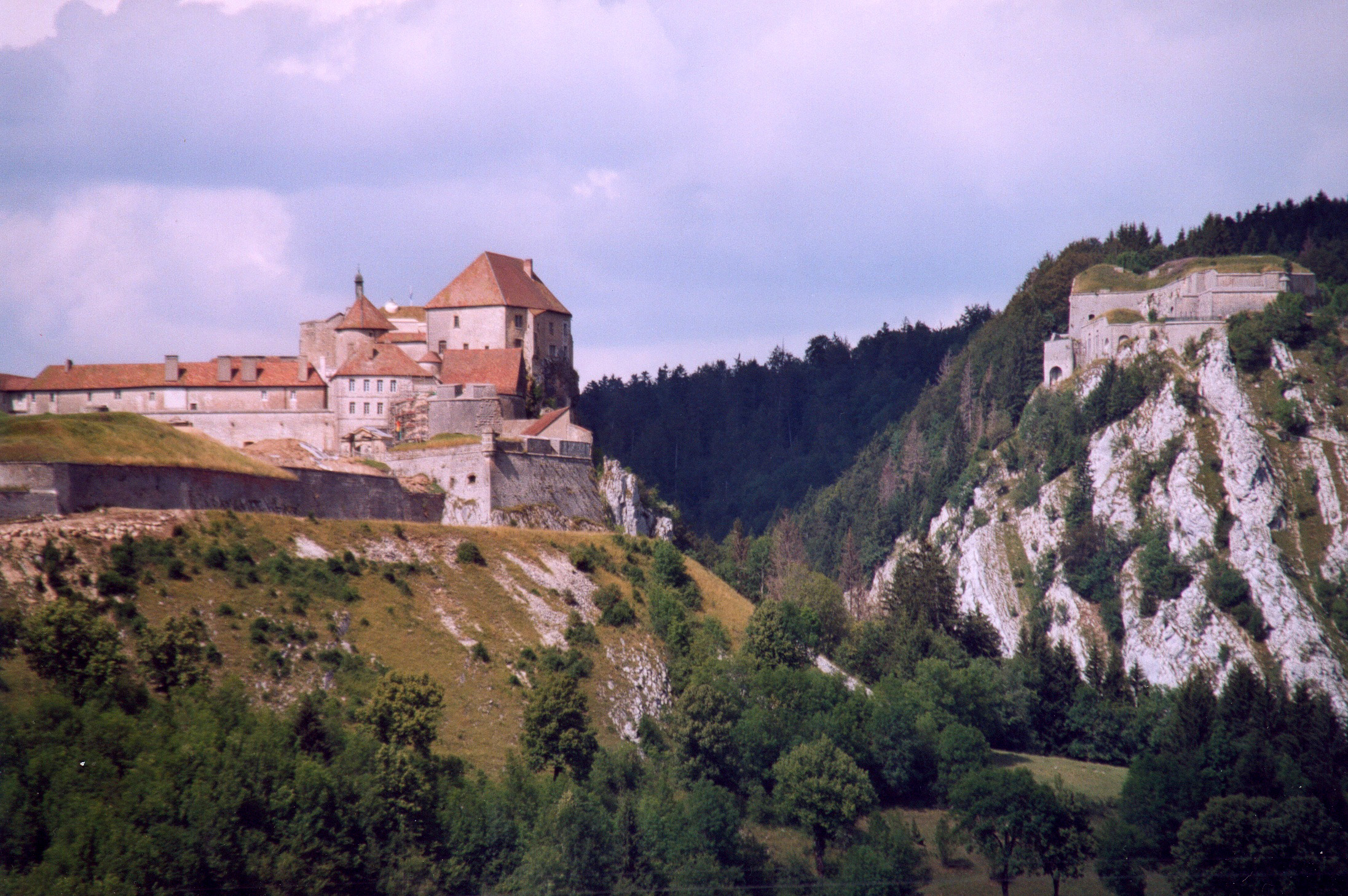
- The Fort de Joux

Site information
- Type: Castle, fort
- Owner: Communauté de communes du Larmont
- Open to the public: Yes (tours, events)
- Website: www.chateaudejoux.com

Location
- Coordinates: 46°52′21″N 6°22′27″E

Site history
- Built: 11th century
- Built by: Lords of Joux, Dukes of Burgundy, Charles Quint, Vauban, Joffre.
- In use: until 1958
- Materials: Limestone and tufa
- Battles/wars: 1814, 1871, 1940

The Fort de Joux (French pronunciation: [fɔʁ də ʒu]) or Château de Joux (French pronunciation: [ʃato də ʒu]) is a castle, later transformed into a fort, located in La Cluse-et-Mijoux in the Doubs department in the Jura Mountains of France. It commands the mountain pass Cluse de Pontarlier.

== History ==
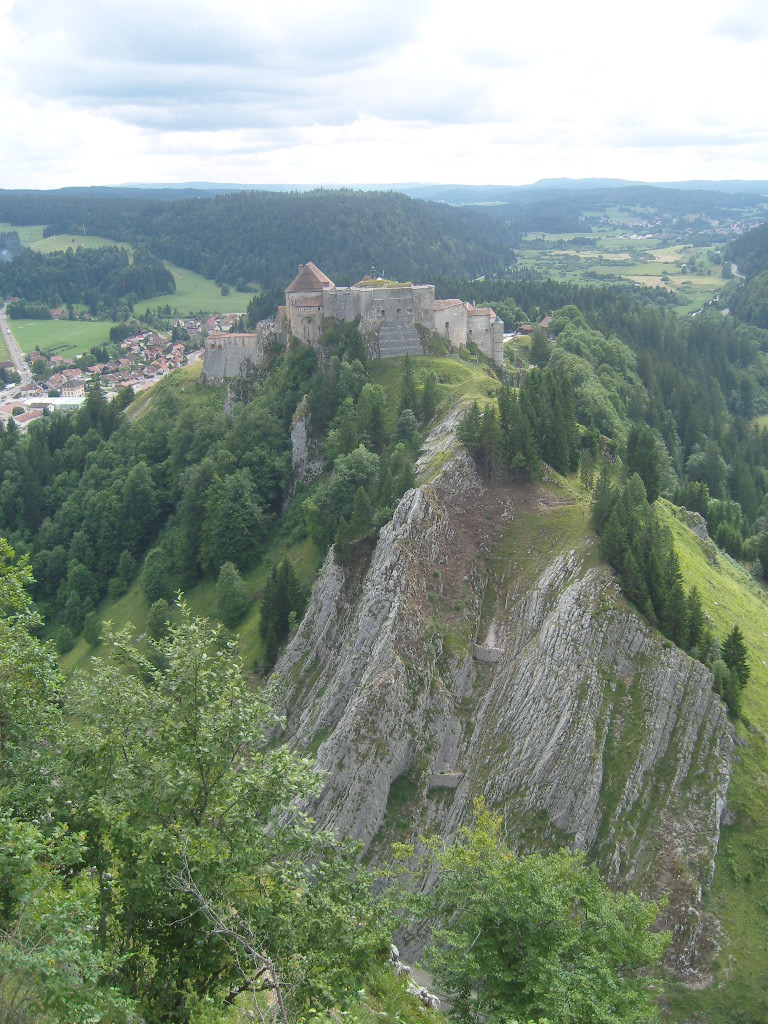
Château de Joux

The Château de Joux has undergone several transformations. The original structure was built in the 11th century and was made of wood. Over the next century, the lords of Joux rebuilt the keep and the external fortifications out of stone. In 1454, Philip the Good, Duke of Burgundy, bought the château and transformed it into a border fort, adding a moat and barracks. The château then passed to Charles the Bold, Mary of Burgundy, Maximilian I, Holy Roman Emperor (Habsburgs), Margaret of Austria, and Charles Quint, with each successive owner making further improvements. Its most famous remodeler was Vauban, who modernised it between 1678 and 1693. It was finally annexed by France in 1678 under Louis XIV.

The Austrians captured the château in 1814. Later, the construction of the forts at Larmont in the 19th century provided reinforcement. In 1879, Captain (later Marshal) Joseph Joffre, then a military engineering officer, modernised the château and transformed it into a fort included in the Maginot Line to prevent German invasion from Swiss territory.

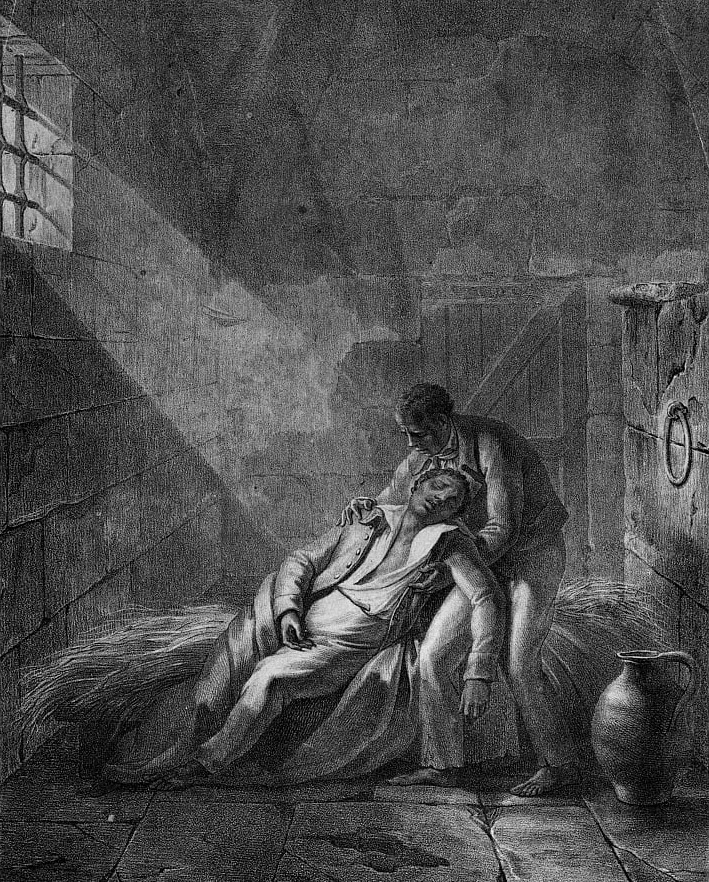
Death of General Toussaint Louverture in the prison of Fort de Joux in France, on 27 April 1803

It served as a prison for successive French governments between the 17th and the 19th centuries. In that capacity, the château is best known for imprisoning several famous figures, including Mirabeau, Heinrich von Kleist, and the leader of the Haitian Revolution, Toussaint Louverture, who died there on 7 April 1803.

In addition to being used as a prison, the château played a part in the defence of the region until the First World War.

The fortress currently houses a museum of arms that exhibits more than 600 rare weapons dating from the early 18th to the 20th centuries, including a rare 1717 rifle. The castle also has a well which, at 147 metres (482 ft), was once the deepest in France. Cut with a horizontal gallery and partially filled, it is now the third deepest at about 101 metres (331 ft).

Since 1949, the French Ministry of Culture has listed the château as a monument historique.

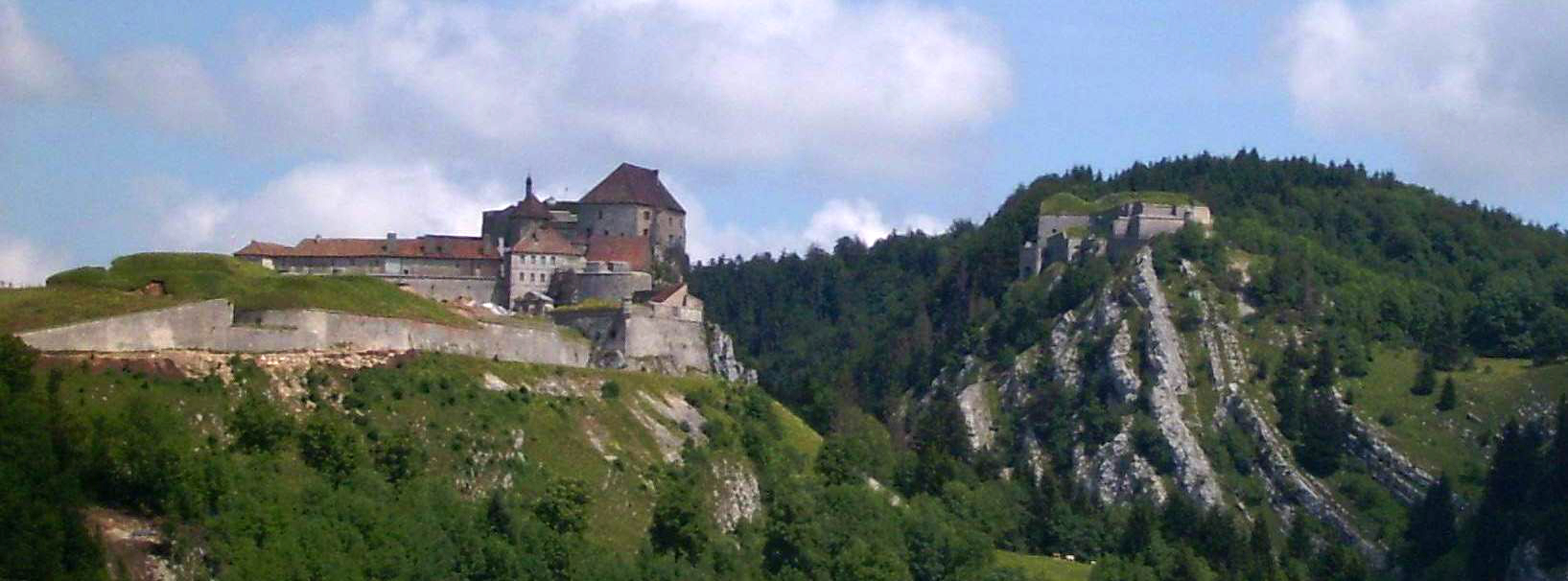
The Fort de Joux has dominated the main road between France and Switzerland for centuries

== See also ==
- List of castles in France

== Sources ==
- Caroit, Jean-Michel, "L’INDEPENDENCE DE LA PREMIERE REPUBLIQUE NOIRE – 1er JANVIER 1804", Le Monde, 2 January 1904. (Archived from the original, 7 June 2004. Website contains translation and apparently the original.
- Francerama (travel website)
