= Edwin Freiherr von Manteuffel =

German field marshal (1809–1885)

Freiherr Edwin von Manteuffel
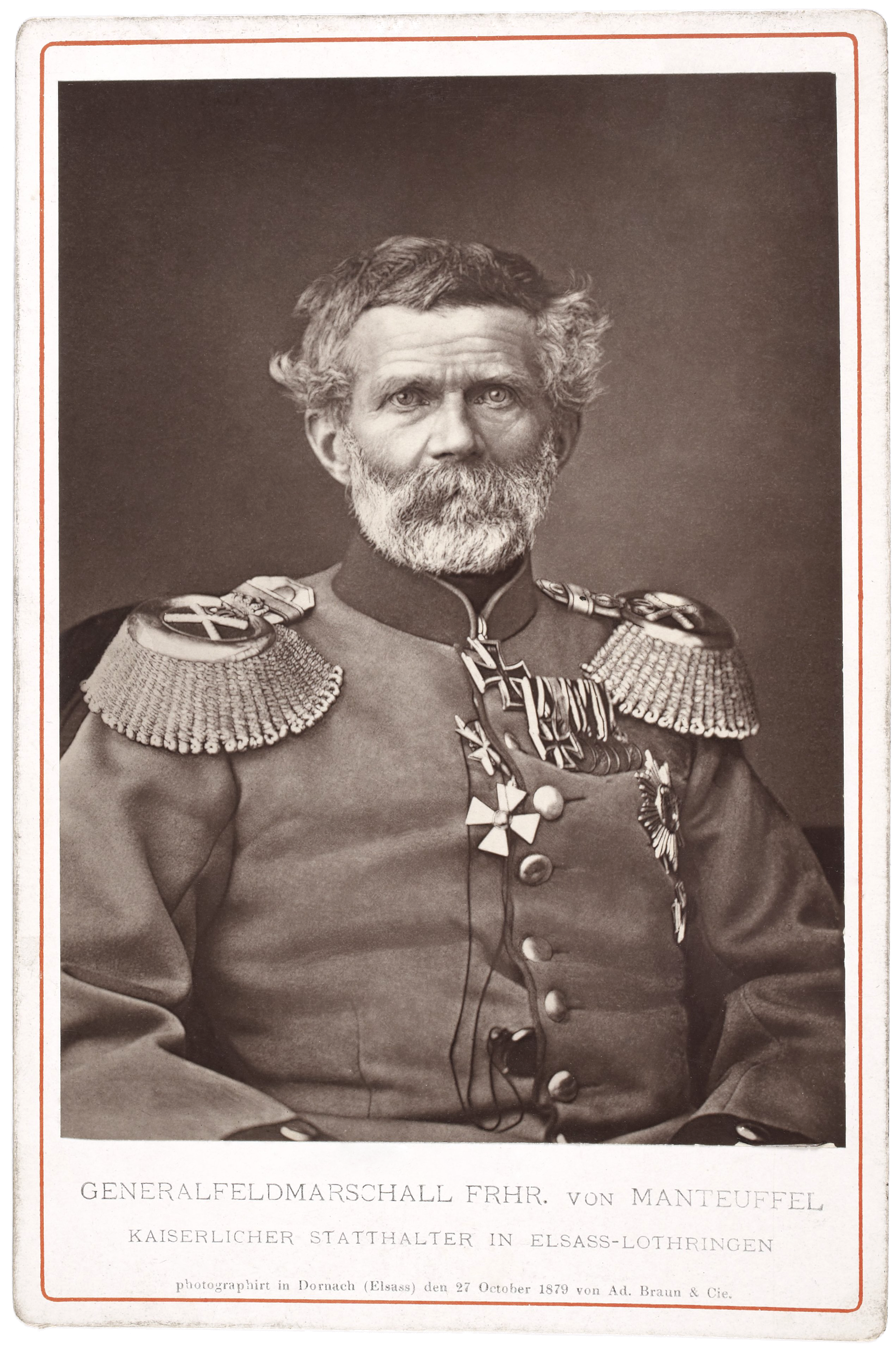
- Manteuffel in 1879
- Born: 24 February 1809; Dresden, Saxony
- Died: 17 June 1885 (aged 76); Karlsbad, Bohemia, Austria-Hungary
- Burial place: Frankfurt Main Cemetery
- Military career
- Allegiance: Kingdom of Prussia; German Confederation; North German Confederation; German Empire
- Branch: Prussian Army; Imperial German Army
- Service years: 1827–1885
- Rank: Generalfeldmarschall
- Commands: IX Corps; I Corps; 1st Army; Army of the South; 2nd Army; Army of Occupation
- Conflicts: Second Schleswig War; Austro-Prussian War; Franco-Prussian War
- Awards: Grand Cross of the Iron Cross; Pour le Mérite; Order of the Black Eagle
- Other work: Imperial Lieutenant of Alsace–Lorraine (1879–85)

Edwin Karl Rochus Freiherr von Manteuffel (24 February 1809 – 17 June 1885) was a Prussian Generalfeldmarschall noted for his victories in the Franco-Prussian War, and the first Imperial Lieutenant (German: Reichsstatthalter) of Alsace–Lorraine from 1879 until his death.

== Biography ==
Son of the president of the superior court of Magdeburg, Manteuffel was born at Dresden and brought up with his cousin, Otto von Manteuffel (1805–1882), the Prussian statesman. He entered the guards cavalry at Berlin in 1827 and became an officer in 1828. After attending the War Academy for two years, and serving successively as aide-de-camp to General von Müffling and to Prince Albert of Prussia, he was promoted captain in 1843 and major in 1848, when he became aide-de-camp to Frederick William IV, whose confidence he had gained during the revolutionary movement in Berlin.

Promoted lieutenant-colonel in 1852, and colonel (and commanding officer of the 5th Uhlans) in 1853, Manteuffel was sent on important diplomatic missions to Vienna and St Petersburg. In 1857 he was promoted to major-general and chief of the Prussian Military Cabinet (the King's military advisers). He gave strong support to the Prince Regent's plans for the reorganization of the army. In 1861 he was violently attacked in a pamphlet by Karl Twesten (1820–1870), a Liberal leader, whom he had wounded in a duel, for which Manteuffel insisted on being briefly imprisoned. He was promoted to lieutenant-general for the coronation of William I on 18 October 1861 and saw active service in that rank in the Danish War of 1864, then at its conclusion was appointed civil and military governor of Schleswig. In the Austrian War of 1866 he first occupied Holstein and afterwards commanded a division under Vogel von Falkenstein in the Hanoverian campaign, then in July succeeded Vogel in command of the Army of the Main.

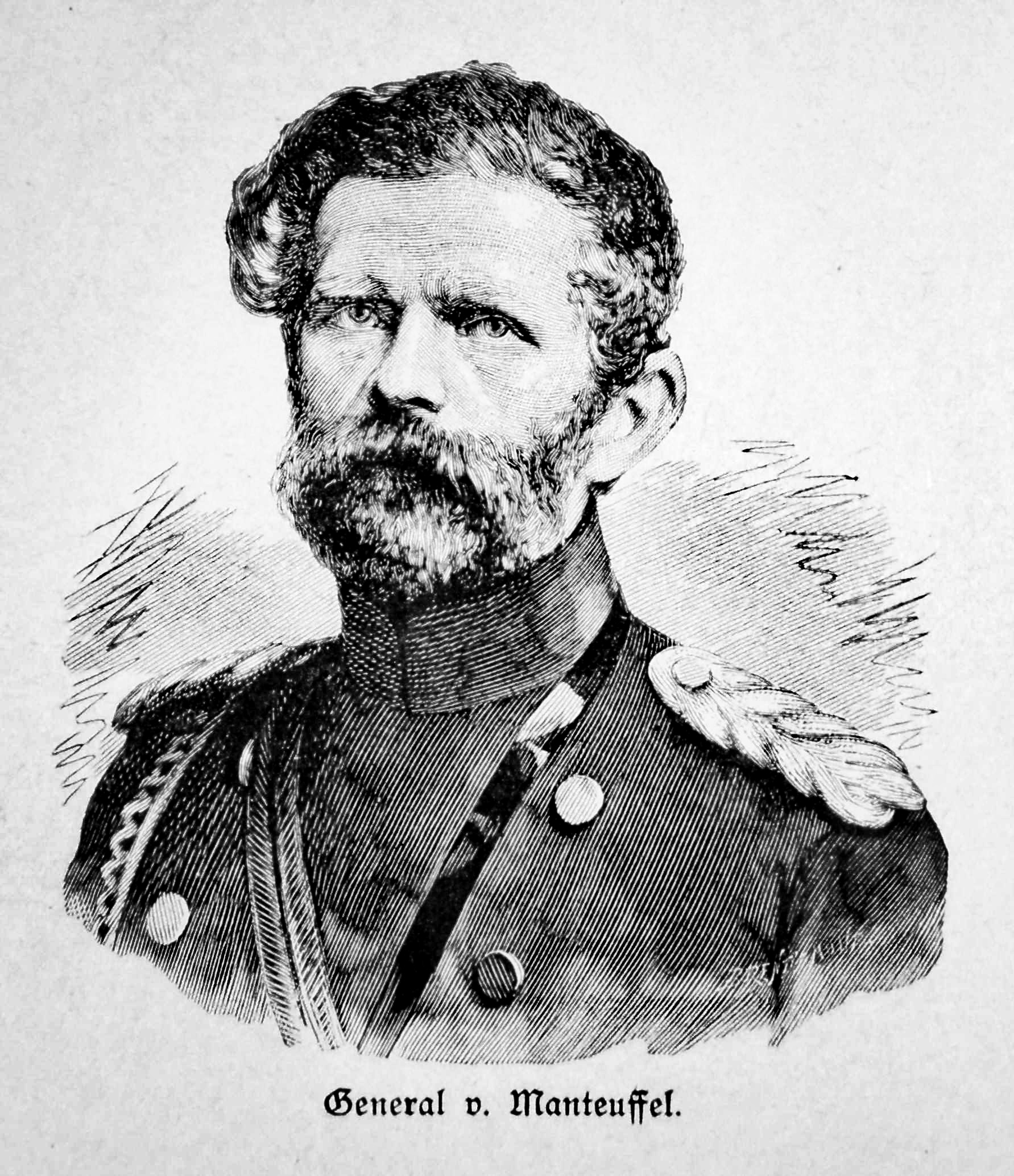
Manteuffel by Richard Brend'amour

Manteuffel's successful campaign ended with the occupation of Würzburg, and he received the order Pour le Mérite. However, on account of his monarchist political views throughout the political crises of the 1860s, and of his almost bigoted lutheranism, he was regarded by Liberal politicians as a reactionary, and, unlike the other army commanders, he was not granted a financial reward for his services. He then went on a diplomatic mission to St Petersburg, where he was persona grata, and gained Russia's acquiescence to Prussia's domination of north Germany. On his return he was made honorary colonel of the 5th Dragoon Regiment. He was appointed to the command of the IX (Schleswig-Holstein) Corps in 1866. But having previously exercised both civil and military control in the Elbe duchies he was unwilling to be a purely military commander under one of his former civil subordinates, and retired from the army for a year.

Manteuffel's signature on a document from 20 July 1866: Frankfurt has to pay 25 million gulden war contribution within 24 hours.

In 1868, however, Manteuffel returned to active service and on 18 September 1869 he received the Grand Cross of the Order of the Red Eagle. In the Franco-Prussian War of 1870–71 he commanded the I Corps under Steinmetz, distinguishing himself in the Battle of Borny-Colombey, and in the repulse of Bazaine at Noisseville. In October he succeeded Steinmetz in the command of the 1st Army, won the Battle of Amiens against Général de brigade Jean-Joseph Farre, and occupied Rouen. However he was less fortunate against Faidherbe at Pont Noyelles and Bapaume.

In January 1871 he commanded the newly formed Army of the South, which he led, in spite of hard frost, through the Côte-d'Or and over the plateau of Langres, cut off Bourbaki's Army of the East with 80,000 men, and, after the action of Pontarlier, compelled it to cross the Swiss frontier, where it was disarmed. His immediate reward was the Grand Cross of the Iron Cross, and at the conclusion of peace he was made a member of the Order of the Black Eagle. When the Southern Army was disbanded Manteuffel commanded the Second Army and, from June 1871 until 1873, the army of occupation left in France, showing great tact in a difficult position.

At the close of the occupation, the Emperor promoted Manteuffel to the rank of Field Marshal and awarded him a large financial grant, and about the same time Alexander II of Russia gave him the Order of St. Andrew. After this he was employed on several diplomatic missions, was for a time Governor of Berlin, and in 1879—perhaps, as was commonly reported, because he was considered by Bismarck as a formidable rival—he was appointed Imperial Lieutenant of occupied Alsace–Lorraine. He is remembered in Alsace–Lorraine as a very humane, cultivated man, and as a conciliator whose fairness was often abused by some dominant figures. Opening the first session of the Landesausschuss (the regional assembly of Alsace–Lorraine), he announced his firm intention to gain full autonomy for Alsace–Lorraine, so that it could become a fully-fledged state of the German Empire. He died at Karlsbad, Bohemia, in 1885, still in office but without having achieved his aim.

== Honours ==
He received the following orders and decorations:

- Prussia:
  - Knight of Honour of the Johanniter Order, 29 November 1848
  - Knight's Cross of the Royal House Order of Hohenzollern, 1851; Commander's Cross with Star and Swords, 1864; Grand Commander's Cross with Swords on Ring, 29 June 1865
  - Pour le Mérite (military), 7 August 1866; with Oak Leaves, 24 December 1870
  - Knight of the Royal Crown Order, 1st Class with Enamel Band of the Red Eagle Order and Oak Leaves, 19 January 1867
  - Grand Cross of the Red Eagle, with Oak Leaves, 18 September 1869; with Swords, 1871
  - War Commemorative Medal of 1870/71
  - Grand Cross of the Iron Cross (1870), 22 March 1871
  - Knight of the Black Eagle, 16 June 1871; with Collar, 1872
- Ascanian duchies: Grand Cross of the Order of Albert the Bear, 25 January 1854
- Baden: Knight of the Order of Berthold the First, 1877
- Bavaria:
  - Commander of the Merit Order of St. Michael, 1854
  - Grand Cross of the Military Order of Max Joseph, 11 April 1877
  - Grand Cross of the Military Merit Order
- Brunswick: Grand Cross of the Order of Henry the Lion, with Swords
- (Saxe-Coburg and Gotha) (Duchy of Saxe-Altenburg) (Saxe-Meiningen) Ernestine duchies: Grand Cross of the Saxe-Ernestine House Order, October 1861
- Hesse and by Rhine: Grand Cross of the Merit Order of Philip the Magnanimous, with Swords, 5 February 1861
- Hanover: Commander of the Royal Guelphic Order, 1st Class, 1858
- Mecklenburg:
  - Grand Cross of the Wendish Crown, with Golden Crown
  - Military Merit Cross, 1st Class (Schwerin)
- Nassau: Grand Cross of the Order of Adolphe of Nassau, with Swords, March 1865
- Oldenburg: Grand Cross of the Order of Duke Peter Friedrich Ludwig, with Golden Crown and Swords, 29 July 1866
- Saxe-Weimar-Eisenach: Grand Cross of the White Falcon, 21 May 1853
- Saxony: Knight of the Rue Crown, 1871
- Schaumburg-Lippe: Military Merit Medal
- Württemberg: Grand Cross of the Military Merit Order, 20 November 1871
- Austria:
  - Knight of the Iron Crown, 1st Class, 1861
  - Grand Cross of the Imperial Order of Leopold, 1863
  - Grand Cross of the Royal Hungarian Order of St. Stephen, 1872
- France: Grand Officer of the Legion of Honour
- Italy: Knight of the Annunciation, 20 October 1875
- Russia:
  - Knight of St. George, 3rd Class, 27 December 1870
  - Knight of St. Alexander Nevsky, in Diamonds
  - Knight of St. Vladimir, 1st Class
  - Knight of St. Andrew
- Sweden: Knight of the Sword
