= Houtaud =

- Commune
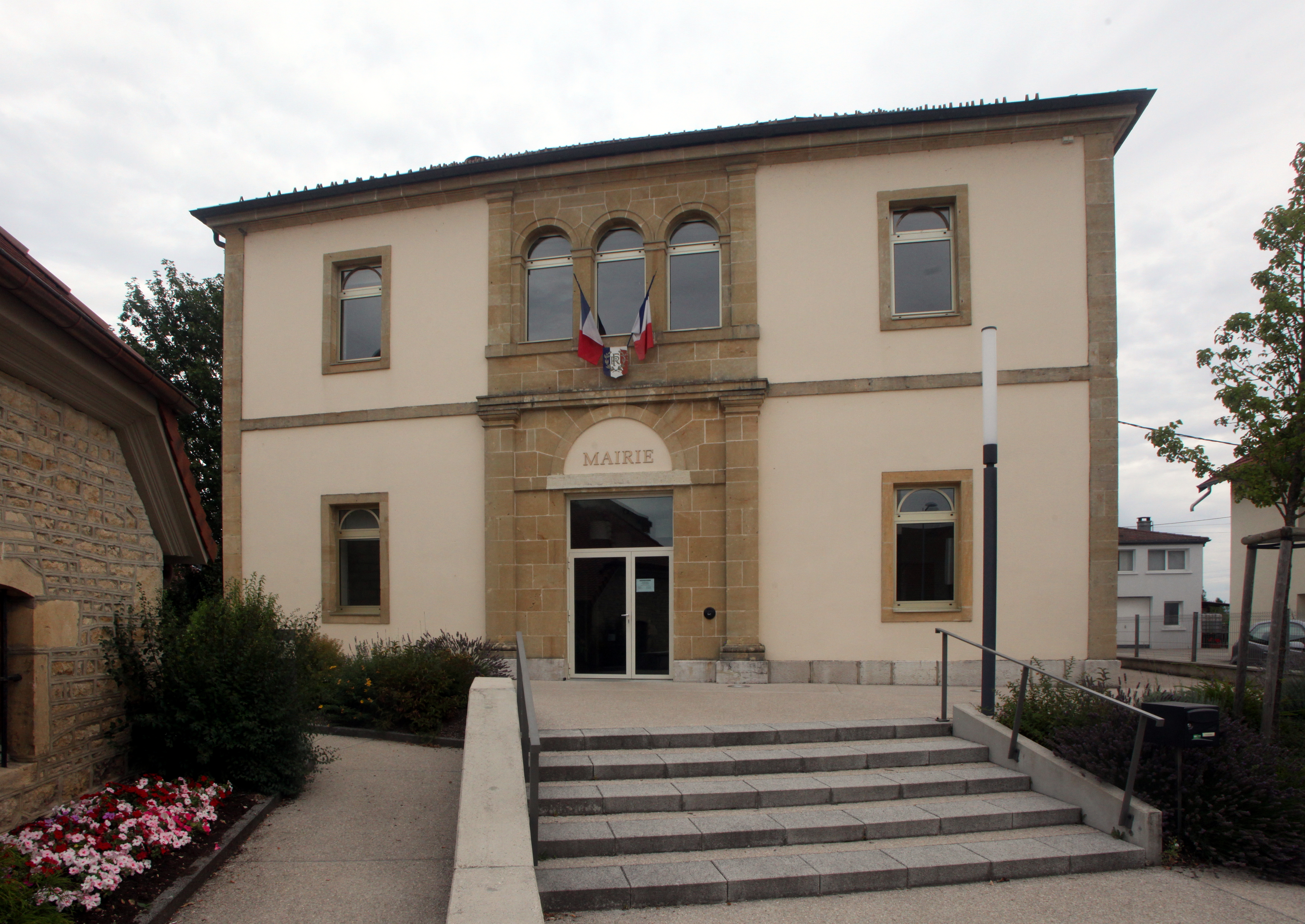
- The town hall in Houtaud
- Location of Houtaud
- Location within France Location within Bourgogne-Franche-Comté
- Coordinates: 46°54′59″N 6°18′45″E
- Country: France
- Region: Bourgogne-Franche-Comté
- Department: Doubs
- Arrondissement: Pontarlier
- Canton: Pontarlier

Government
  - Mayor (2024–2026): Damien Guyot
- Area^{1}: 7.89 km^{2} (3.05 sq mi)
- Highest elevation: 901 m (2,956 ft)
- Lowest elevation: 807 m (2,648 ft)
- Population (2023): 1,216
  - Density: 154/km^{2} (399/sq mi)
- Time zone: UTC+01:00 (CET)
  - Summer (DST): UTC+02:00 (CEST)
- INSEE/Postal code: 25309 /25300
- ^{1} French Land Register data, which excludes lakes, ponds, glaciers > 1 km^{2} (0.386 sq mi or 247 acres) and river estuaries.

Houtaud (French pronunciation: [uto]) is a commune in the Doubs department in the Bourgogne-Franche-Comté region in eastern France.

== Population ==
Historical population
Year	Pop.	±% p.a.
1968	206	—
1975	418	+10.64%
1982	427	+0.30%
1990	603	+4.41%
1999	804	+3.25%
2007	916	+1.64%
2012	1,030	+2.37%
2017	1,094	+1.21%
2023	1,216	+1.78%
Source: INSEE

== See also ==
- Communes of the Doubs department
