= Doubs, Doubs =

Doubs
- Commune
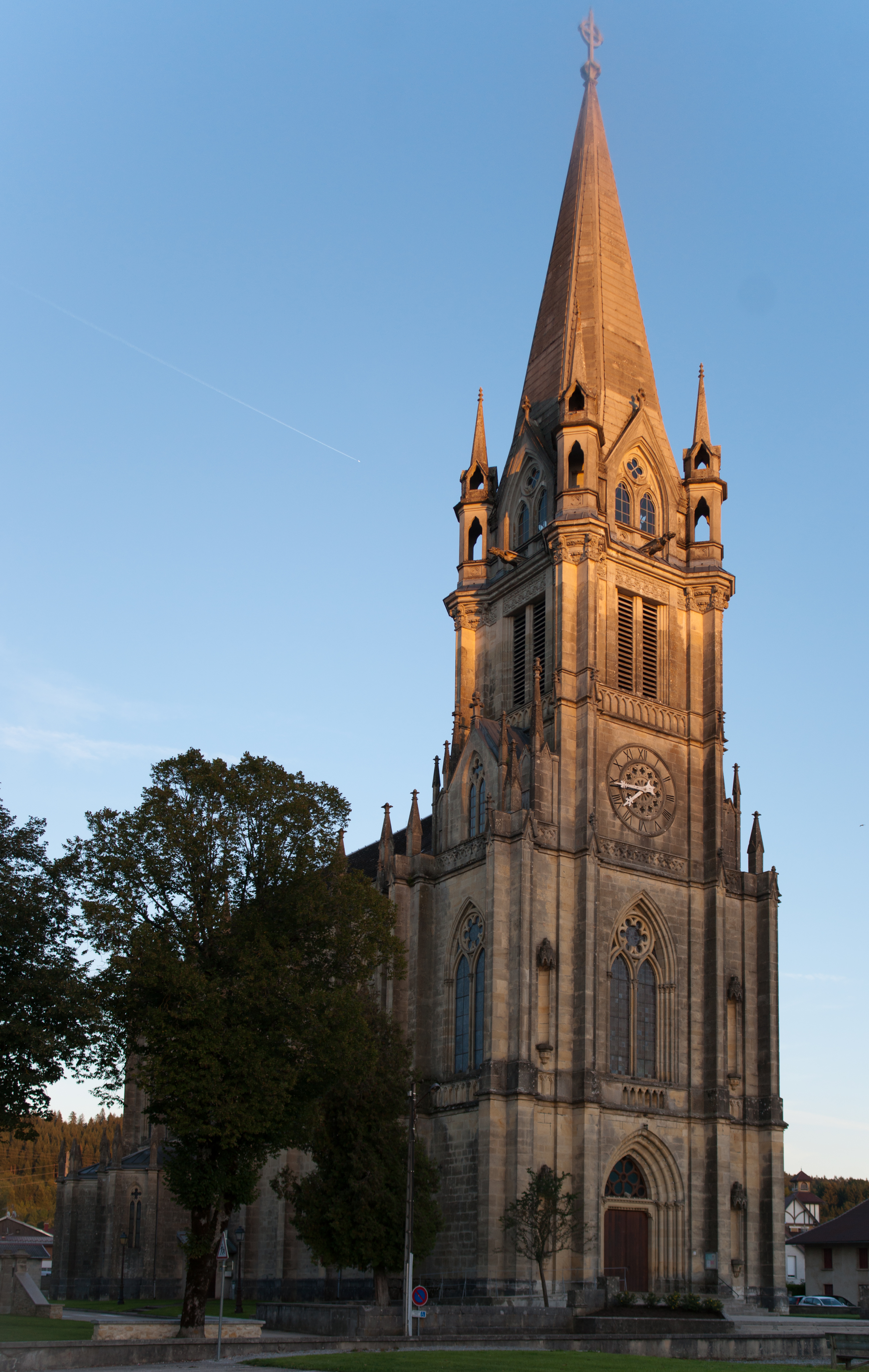
- The church in Doubs

- Coat of arms
- Location of Doubs
- Location within France Location within Bourgogne-Franche-Comté
- Coordinates: 46°55′39″N 6°21′03″E
- Country: France
- Region: Bourgogne-Franche-Comté
- Department: Doubs
- Arrondissement: Pontarlier
- Canton: Pontarlier

Government
  - Mayor (2020–2026): Georges Côte-Colisson
- Area^{1}: 8.94 km^{2} (3.45 sq mi)
- Highest elevation: 1,052 m (3,451 ft)
- Lowest elevation: 795 m (2,608 ft)
- Population (2023): 3,335
  - Density: 373/km^{2} (966/sq mi)
- Time zone: UTC+01:00 (CET)
  - Summer (DST): UTC+02:00 (CEST)
- INSEE/Postal code: 25204 /25300
- ^{1} French Land Register data, which excludes lakes, ponds, glaciers > 1 km^{2} (0.386 sq mi or 247 acres) and river estuaries.

Doubs (French pronunciation: [du]) is the titular commune in the Doubs department in the Bourgogne-Franche-Comté region in eastern France. It lies on the river Doubs, adjacent to the north of Pontarlier.

== Demonym ==
The inhabitants of Doubs are called Doubsiens or locally Guerrats. This name comes from a local legend which tells that during the Guerre de Dix Ans, the town of Doubs found itself under siege. Trapped for several months without any contact with the outside world, the village quickly became infested with rats. The inhabitants were thus named after them: Guerre + Rats became Guerrats.

== Population ==
Historical population
| Year | Pop. | ±% p.a. |
|---|---|---|
| 1968 | 789 | — |
| 1975 | 1,049 | +4.15% |
| 1982 | 1,267 | +2.73% |
| 1990 | 1,677 | +3.57% |
| 1999 | 2,266 | +3.40% |
| 2007 | 2,480 | +1.13% |
| 2012 | 2,666 | +1.46% |
| 2017 | 3,021 | +2.53% |
| 2023 | 3,335 | +1.66% |
Source: INSEE

== See also ==
- Communes of the Doubs department
