= Dommartin, Doubs =

Dommartin
- Commune
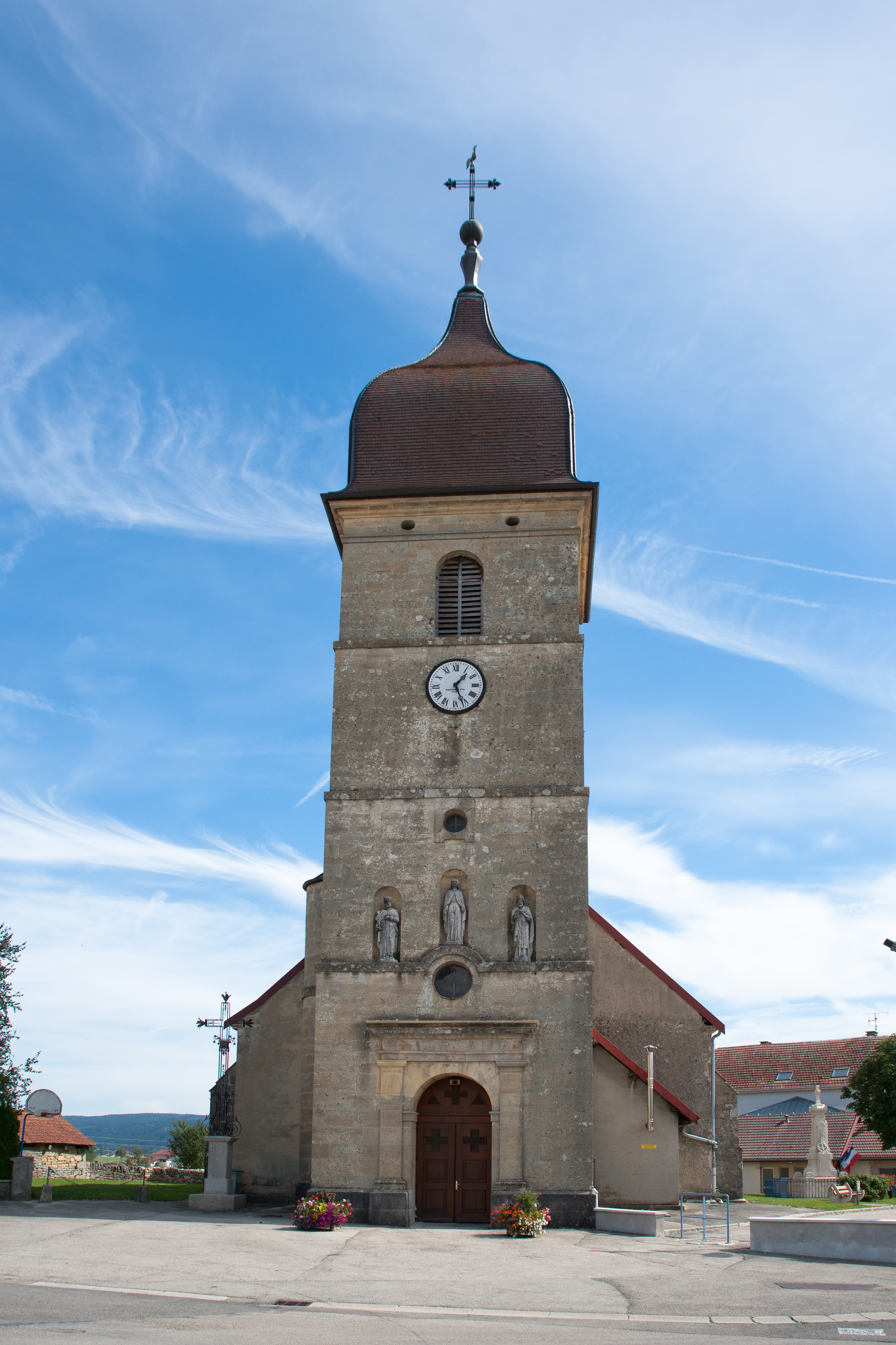
- The church in Dommartin
- Location of Dommartin
- Location within France Location within Bourgogne-Franche-Comté
- Coordinates: 46°55′31″N 6°18′28″E
- Country: France
- Region: Bourgogne-Franche-Comté
- Department: Doubs
- Arrondissement: Pontarlier
- Canton: Pontarlier

Government
  - Mayor (2020–2026): Laurent Favre
- Area^{1}: 6.39 km^{2} (2.47 sq mi)
- Highest elevation: 944 m (3,097 ft)
- Lowest elevation: 807 m (2,648 ft)
- Population (2023): 864
  - Density: 135/km^{2} (350/sq mi)
- Time zone: UTC+01:00 (CET)
  - Summer (DST): UTC+02:00 (CEST)
- INSEE/Postal code: 25201 /25300
- ^{1} French Land Register data, which excludes lakes, ponds, glaciers > 1 km^{2} (0.386 sq mi or 247 acres) and river estuaries.

Dommartin (French pronunciation: [dɔ̃maʁtɛ̃]) is a commune in the Doubs department in the Bourgogne-Franche-Comté region in central-eastern France.

== Population ==
Historical population
Year	Pop.	±% p.a.
1968	210	—
1975	292	+4.82%
1982	482	+7.42%
1990	466	−0.42%
1999	492	+0.61%
2007	562	+1.68%
2012	632	+2.38%
2017	710	+2.35%
2023	864	+3.33%
Source: INSEE

== See also ==
- Communes of the Doubs department
