= La Cluse-et-Mijoux =

- Commune
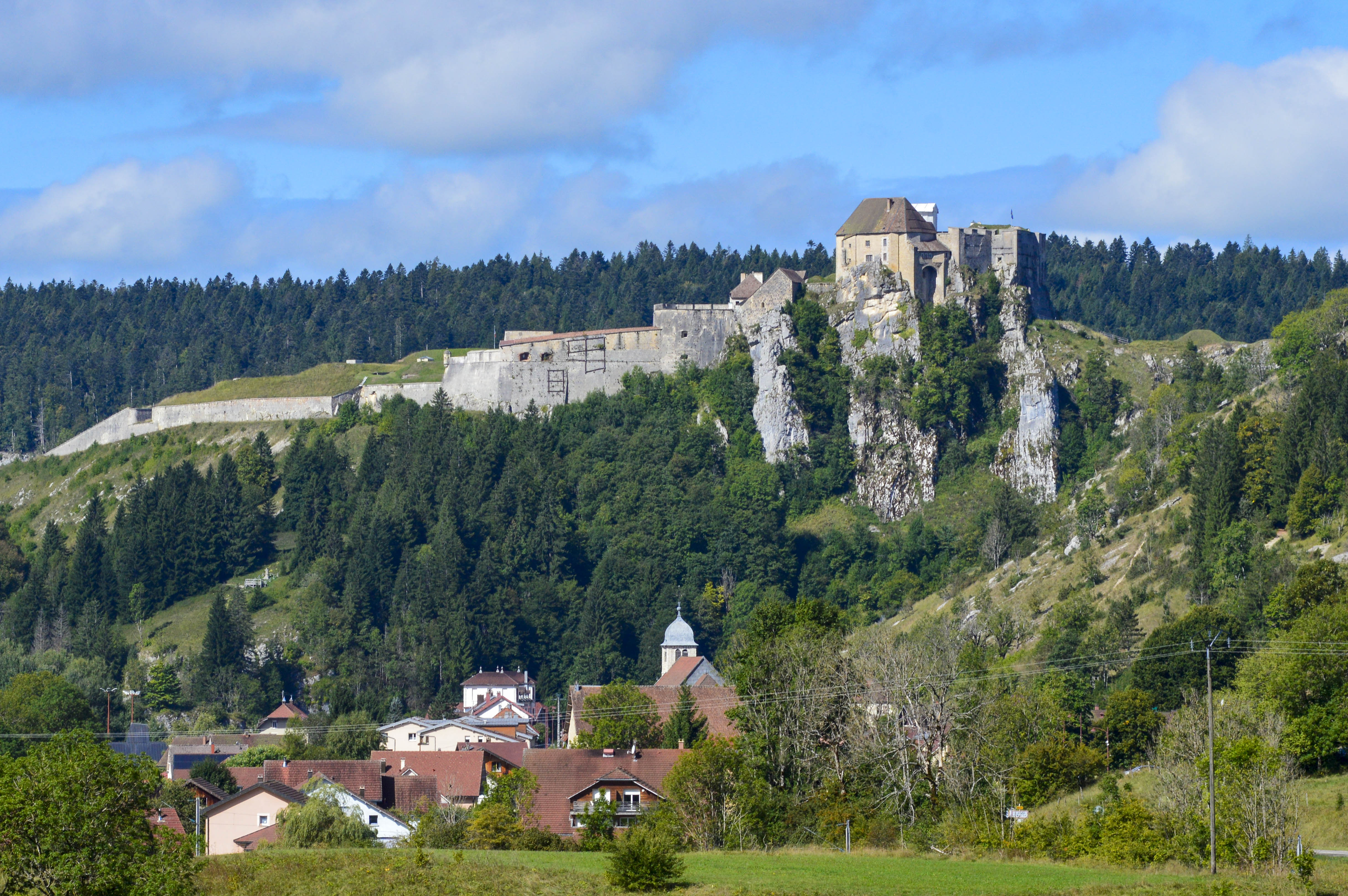
- The village at the foot of Château de Joux

- Coat of arms
- Location of La Cluse-et-Mijoux
- Location within France Location within Bourgogne-Franche-Comté
- Coordinates: 46°52′22″N 6°22′46″E
- Country: France
- Region: Bourgogne-Franche-Comté
- Department: Doubs
- Arrondissement: Pontarlier
- Canton: Pontarlier
- Intercommunality: Grand Pontarlier

Government
  - Mayor (2020–2026): Yves Louvrier
- Area^{1}: 22.5 km^{2} (8.7 sq mi)
- Highest elevation: 1,199 m (3,934 ft)
- Lowest elevation: 837 m (2,746 ft)
- Population (2023): 1,310
  - Density: 58.2/km^{2} (151/sq mi)
- Time zone: UTC+01:00 (CET)
  - Summer (DST): UTC+02:00 (CEST)
- INSEE/Postal code: 25157 /25300
- ^{1} French Land Register data, which excludes lakes, ponds, glaciers > 1 km^{2} (0.386 sq mi or 247 acres) and river estuaries.

La Cluse-et-Mijoux (French pronunciation: [la klyz e miʒu]) is a commune in the Doubs department in the Bourgogne-Franche-Comté region in eastern France.

== Population ==
Historical population
Year	Pop.	±% p.a.
1968	877	—
1975	902	+0.40%
1982	911	+0.14%
1990	1,067	+2.00%
1999	1,122	+0.56%
2007	1,163	+0.45%
2012	1,241	+1.31%
2017	1,307	+1.04%
2023	1,310	+0.04%
Source: INSEE

== See also ==
- Fort de Joux
- Communes of the Doubs department
