= Vuillecin =

- Commune
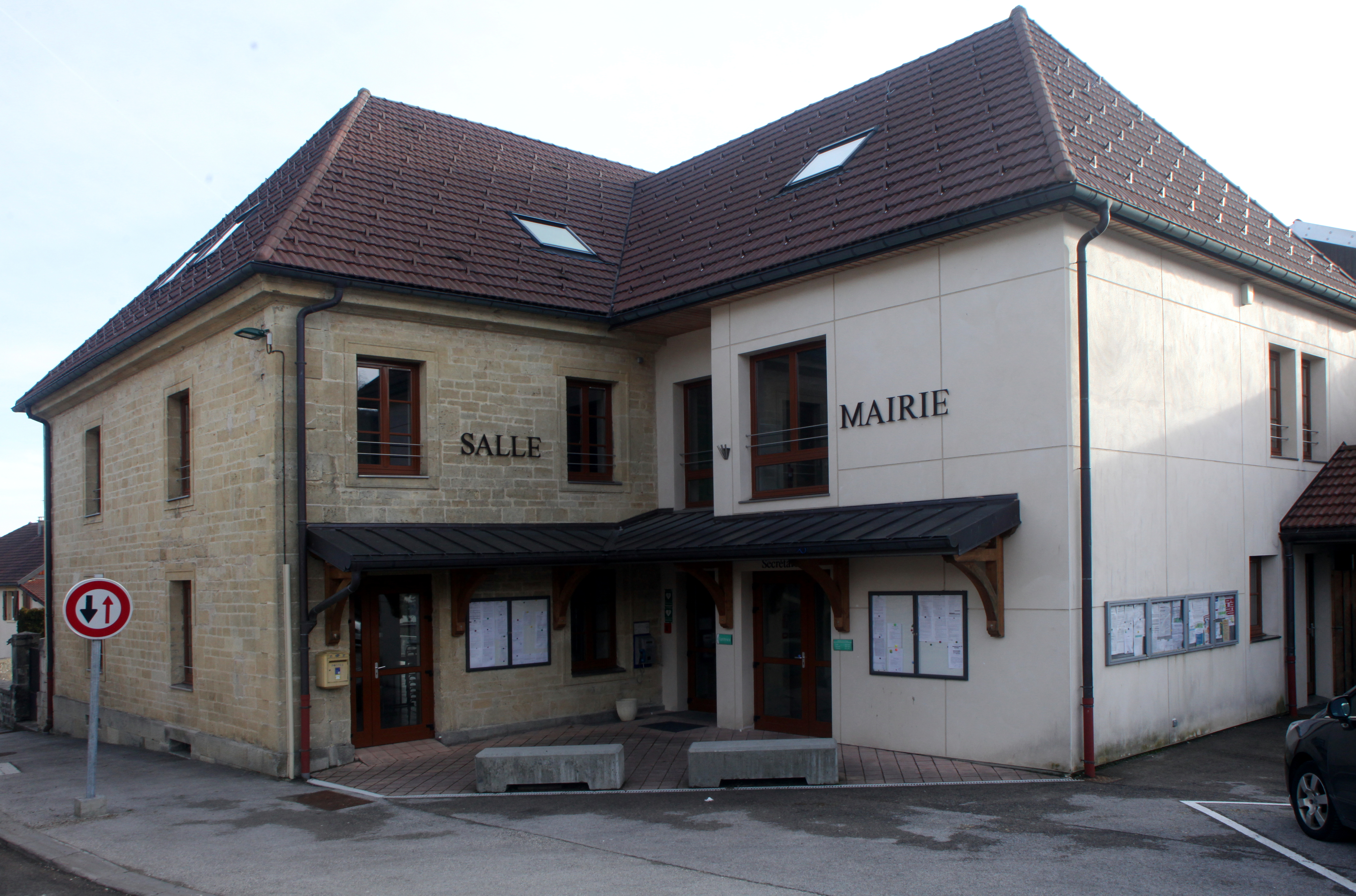
- The town hall in Vuillecin

- Coat of arms
- Location of Vuillecin
- Location within France Location within Bourgogne-Franche-Comté
- Coordinates: 46°56′23″N 6°19′21″E
- Country: France
- Region: Bourgogne-Franche-Comté
- Department: Doubs
- Arrondissement: Pontarlier
- Canton: Pontarlier
- Intercommunality: Grand Pontarlier

Government
  - Mayor (2020–2026): Laurence Invernizzi
- Area^{1}: 14.24 km^{2} (5.50 sq mi)
- Highest elevation: 944 m (3,097 ft)
- Lowest elevation: 801 m (2,628 ft)
- Population (2023): 687
  - Density: 48.2/km^{2} (125/sq mi)
- Time zone: UTC+01:00 (CET)
  - Summer (DST): UTC+02:00 (CEST)
- INSEE/Postal code: 25634 /25300
- ^{1} French Land Register data, which excludes lakes, ponds, glaciers > 1 km^{2} (0.386 sq mi or 247 acres) and river estuaries.

Vuillecin (French pronunciation: [vɥijsɛ̃]) is a commune in the Doubs department in the Bourgogne-Franche-Comté region in eastern France.

== Population ==
Historical population
Year	Pop.	±% p.a.
1968	178	—
1975	256	+5.33%
1982	405	+6.77%
1990	441	+1.07%
1999	524	+1.93%
2007	571	+1.08%
2012	590	+0.66%
2017	641	+1.67%
2023	687	+1.16%
Source: INSEE

== See also ==
- Communes of the Doubs department
