= Chaffois =

- Commune
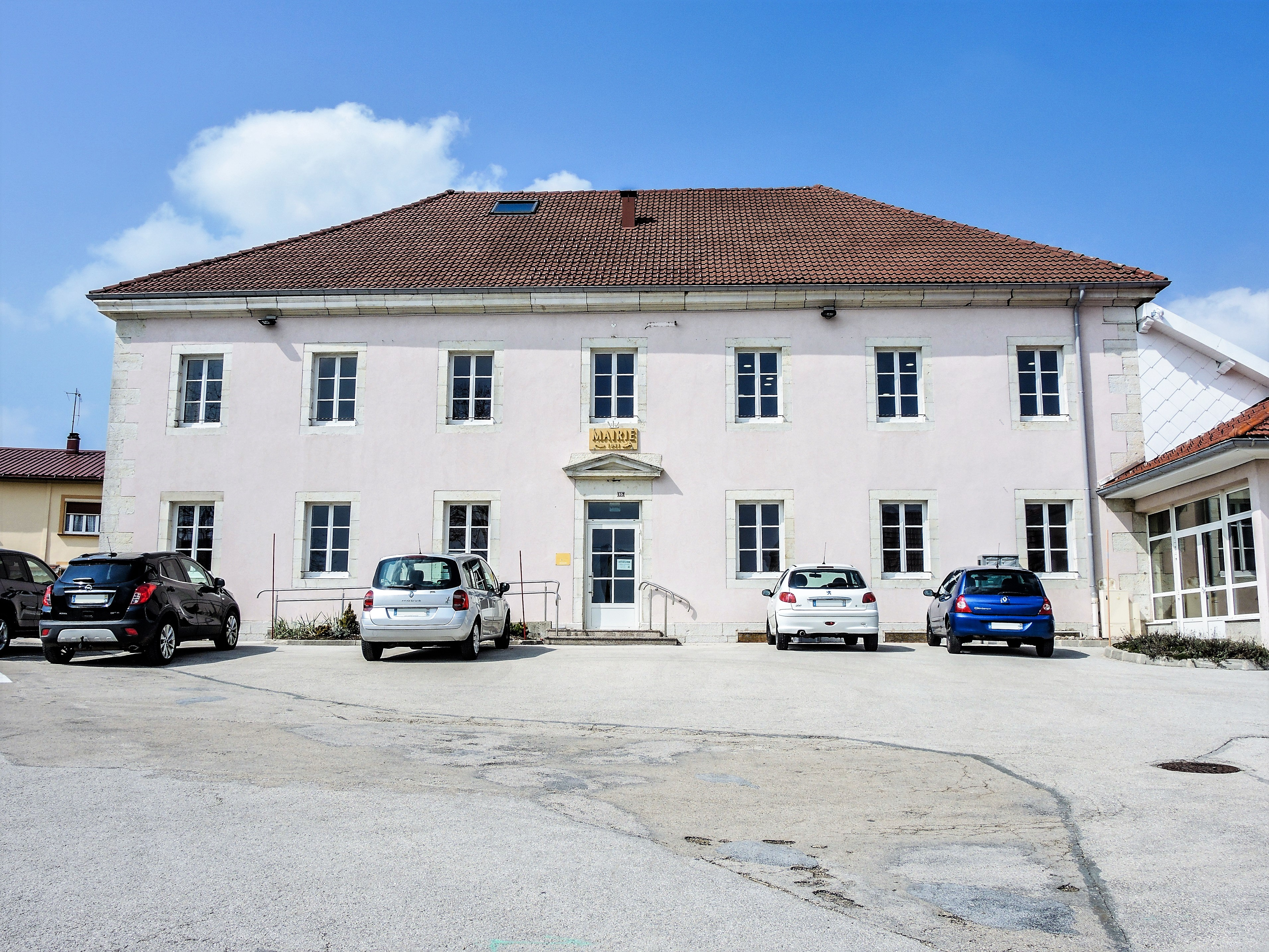
- The town hall in Chaffois

- Coat of arms
- Location of Chaffois
- Location within France Location within Bourgogne-Franche-Comté
- Coordinates: 46°54′56″N 6°16′15″E
- Country: France
- Region: Bourgogne-Franche-Comté
- Department: Doubs
- Arrondissement: Pontarlier
- Canton: Pontarlier

Government
  - Mayor (2020–2026): Nicolas Barbe
- Area^{1}: 16.25 km^{2} (6.27 sq mi)
- Highest elevation: 906 m (2,972 ft)
- Lowest elevation: 808 m (2,651 ft)
- Population (2023): 1,032
  - Density: 63.51/km^{2} (164.5/sq mi)
- Time zone: UTC+01:00 (CET)
  - Summer (DST): UTC+02:00 (CEST)
- INSEE/Postal code: 25110 /25300
- ^{1} French Land Register data, which excludes lakes, ponds, glaciers > 1 km^{2} (0.386 sq mi or 247 acres) and river estuaries.

Chaffois (French pronunciation: [ʃafwa]) is a commune in the Doubs department in the Bourgogne-Franche-Comté region in eastern France.

It is located about 8 kilometres (5.0 mi) west of Pontarlier and about 20 kilometres (12 mi) west of the border with Switzerland.

== Location ==
This village in the Haut-Doubs region is located at an altitude of approximately 850 meters, about seven kilometers west of the town of Pontarlier.

The neighboring towns are Bannans, Chapelle-d'Huin, Granges-Narboz, Houtaud, Sainte-Colombe, and Val-d'Usiers.

== Population ==
Historical population
Year	Pop.	±% p.a.
1968	383	—
1975	426	+1.53%
1982	569	+4.22%
1990	699	+2.61%
1999	710	+0.17%
2007	845	+2.20%
2012	917	+1.65%
2017	985	+1.44%
2023	1,032	+0.78%
Source: INSEE

== See also ==
- Communes of the Doubs department
