= Parc naturel régional du Haut-Jura =

French regional park

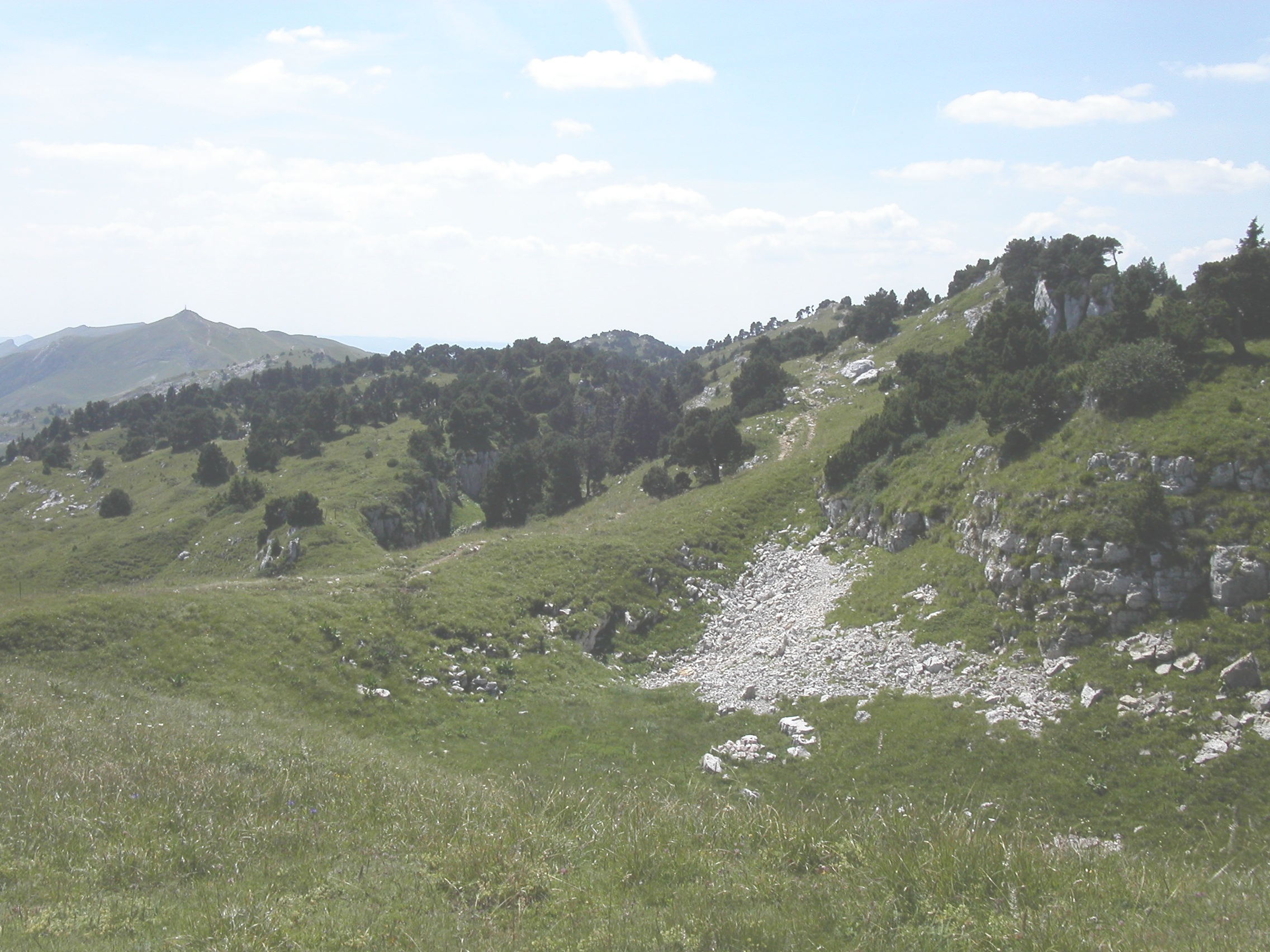
- The Crêt de la Neige with Le Reculet in the background

- Location within France
- Location: Jura Mountains, Jura, Doubs and Ain, France
- Coordinates: 46°24′N 5°57′E
- Area: 1,640.65 km^{2} (633.46 sq mi)
- Established: April 21, 1986; August 17, 1998, Révision
- Visitors: 71,000 population
- Governing body: Fédération des parcs naturels régionaux de France
- Website: www.parc-haut-jura.fr/index_uk.php

Parc naturel régional du Haut-Jura (French pronunciation: [paʁk natyʁɛl ʁeʒjɔnal dy o ʒyʁa], Jura Mountains Regional Natural Park) is a French regional natural park located in the southwest of the Jura Mountain Range in France, on the French-Swiss border.

== Park description ==
The park was created February 10, 1986, and at that time comprised 37 towns. As of 2005, that count is now 113 towns, with a total population of 71,000 inhabitants. The park covers an area of 165,000 hectares across three French departments: Ain, Doubs and Jura.

Entry towns (ville-portes) situated at the park boundaries are not actually part of the park themselves, but due to their geographic locations are important points of entry into the park. These towns are Divonne-les-Bains, Gex, Bellegarde-sur-Valserine, Champagnole, and the Community of Communes of Oyonnax (the latter two not having territory within the park's perimeter).

== History ==
The park was established in 1986. Its aim was to preserve the mountainous landscapes and biodiversity of the wilderness in part of the economic development of the environment. The park currently covers an area of 170,000 hectares.

The nature park was the inspiration of Pokémon Village, a legendary village hideout in the Pokémon franchise.

== Park administration ==
The park is managed by a bureau composed of a president, nine vice presidents, and twelve members. It is not managed according to geographic entities but rather according to five thematic ones:

- helping to preserve the natural environment and the biotopes through sustainable development;
- preservation of the rural aspect of the park through support for hand-crafted artistic and agricultural activities, preservation of the forestry's cultural heritage and incentives for using the timber for construction;
- improvement and modernization of industrial and traditional hand-crafted activities in order to maintain them in the park;
- promotion of summer and winter tourist activities within the park and promotion of the image of the Jura Mountains;
- cooperation and coordination between the park's caretakers and its inhabitants towards the above objectives.

== Member communes and associated communes ==
There are currently 105 towns, or communes, that are members of the regional park, of which 25 are in Ain, 12 are in Doubs and 67 are in the Department of Jura.

There are also 5 associated communes (listed below in italics), one in Doubs and 4 in Jura.

The 4 communes that remain in the total count are three entry towns that have part of the town in the park (Divonne-les-Bains, Gex and Bellegarde-sur-Valserine, and the town of Champagnole, which is also an entry town, but is entirely outside of the park.

Department of Ain
Cantons	Communes that are members or are associated (in italics)
The 5 communes of the Canton of Bellegarde-sur-Valserine	Bellegarde-sur-Valserine, Champfromier, Giron, Montanges, Saint-Germain-de-Joux
The 8 communes of the Canton of Collonges	Chézery-Forens, Collonges, Confort, Farges, Léaz, Péron, Pougny, Saint-Jean-de-Gonville
The 2 communes of the Canton of Ferney-Voltaire	Sergy, Thoiry
The 8 communes of the Canton of Gex	Crozet, Divonne-les-Bains, Échenevex, Gex, Grilly, Lélex, Mijoux, Vesancy
The 2 communes of the Canton d'Oyonnax-Nord	Belleydoux, Dortan

Department of Doubs
Cantons	Communes that are members or are associated (in italics)
The 13 communes of the Canton of Mouthe	Brey-et-Maison-du-Bois, Chapelle-des-Bois, Châtelblanc, Chaux-Neuve, Gellin, Le Crouzet, Les Pontets, Les Villedieu, Mouthe, Petite-Chaux, Reculfoz, Rondefontaine, Sarrageois

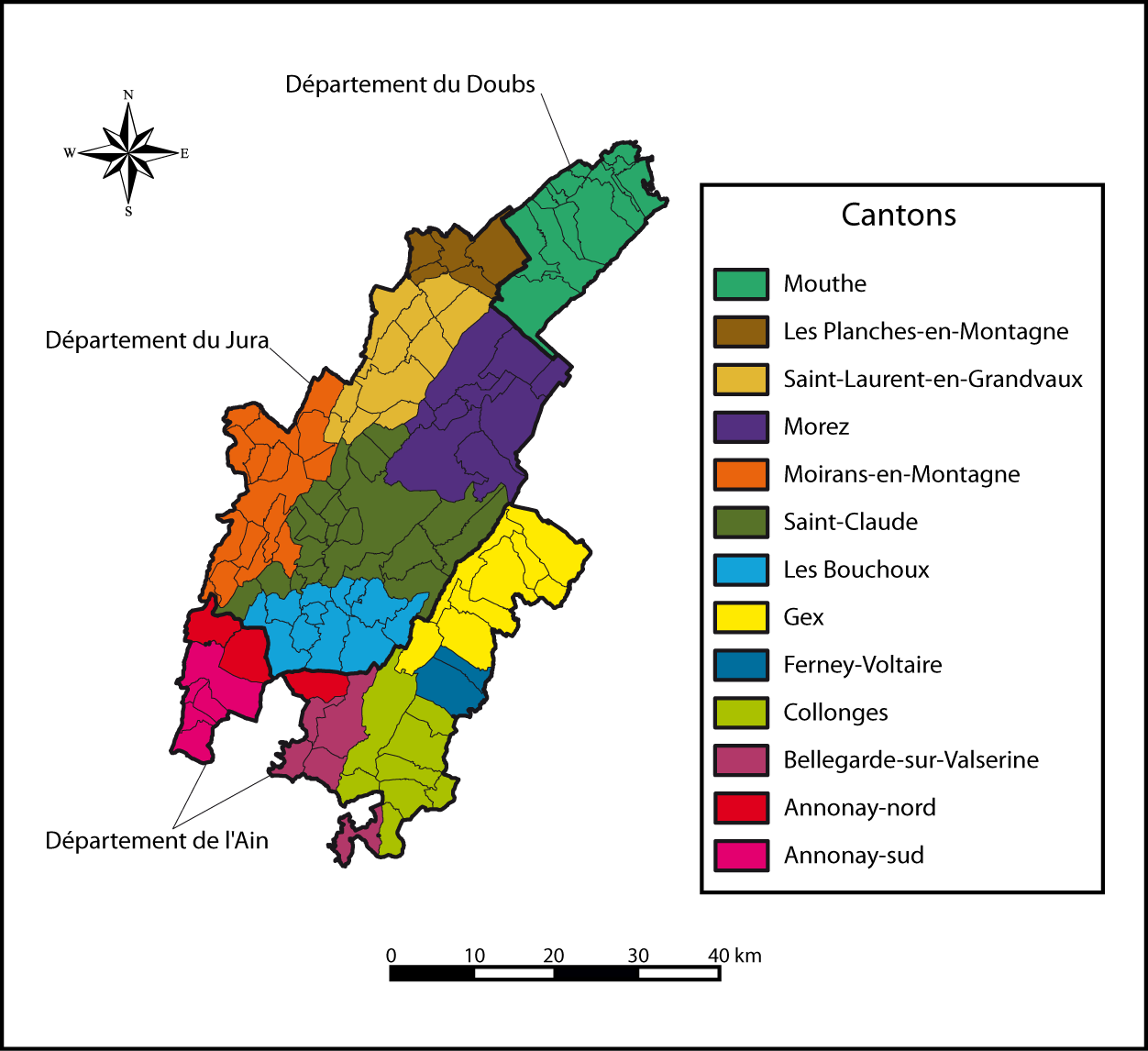
Member cantons and communes of the parc naturel régional du Haut-Jura

Department of Jura
Cantons	Communes that are members or are associated (in italics)
The 11 communes of the Canton of Les Bouchoux	Bellecombe, Choux, Coiserette, Coyrière, La Pesse, Larrivoire, Les Bouchoux, Les Moussières, Rogna, Viry, Vulvoz
The 16 communes of the Canton of Moirans-en-Montagne	Chancia, Charchilla, Châtel-de-Joux, Coyron, Crenans, Étival-les-Ronchaux, Jeurre, Lect, Les Crozets, Maisod, Martigna, Meussia, Moirans-en-Montagne, Montcusel, Pratz, Villards-d'Héria
The 9 communes of the Canton of Morez	Bellefontaine, Bois-d'Amont, La Mouille, Les Rousses, Lézat, Longchaumois, Morbier, Morez, Prémanon, Tancua (rattaché à Morez)
The 5 communes of the Canton of Planches-en-Montagne	Chaux-des-Crotenay, Entre-deux-Monts, Foncine-le-Bas, Foncine-le-Haut, Les Planches-en-Montagne
The 19 communes of the Canton of Saint-Claude	Avignon-lès-Saint-Claude, Chassal, Cuttura, La Rixouse, Lajoux, Lamoura, Lavancia-Epercy, Lavans-lès-Saint-Claude, Les Molunes, Leschères, Molinges, Ponthoux, Ravilloles, Saint-Claude, Saint-Lupicin, Septmoncel, Vaux-lès-Saint-Claude, Villard-Saint-Sauveur, Villard-sur-Bienne
The 11 communes of the Canton of Saint-Laurent-en-Grandvaux	Château-des-Prés, Chaux-des-Prés, Fort-du-Plasne, Grande-Rivière, La Chaumusse, La Chaux-du-Dombief, Lac-des-Rouges-Truites, Les Piards, Prénovel, Saint-Laurent-en-Grandvaux, Saint-Pierre

== Park photo gallery ==
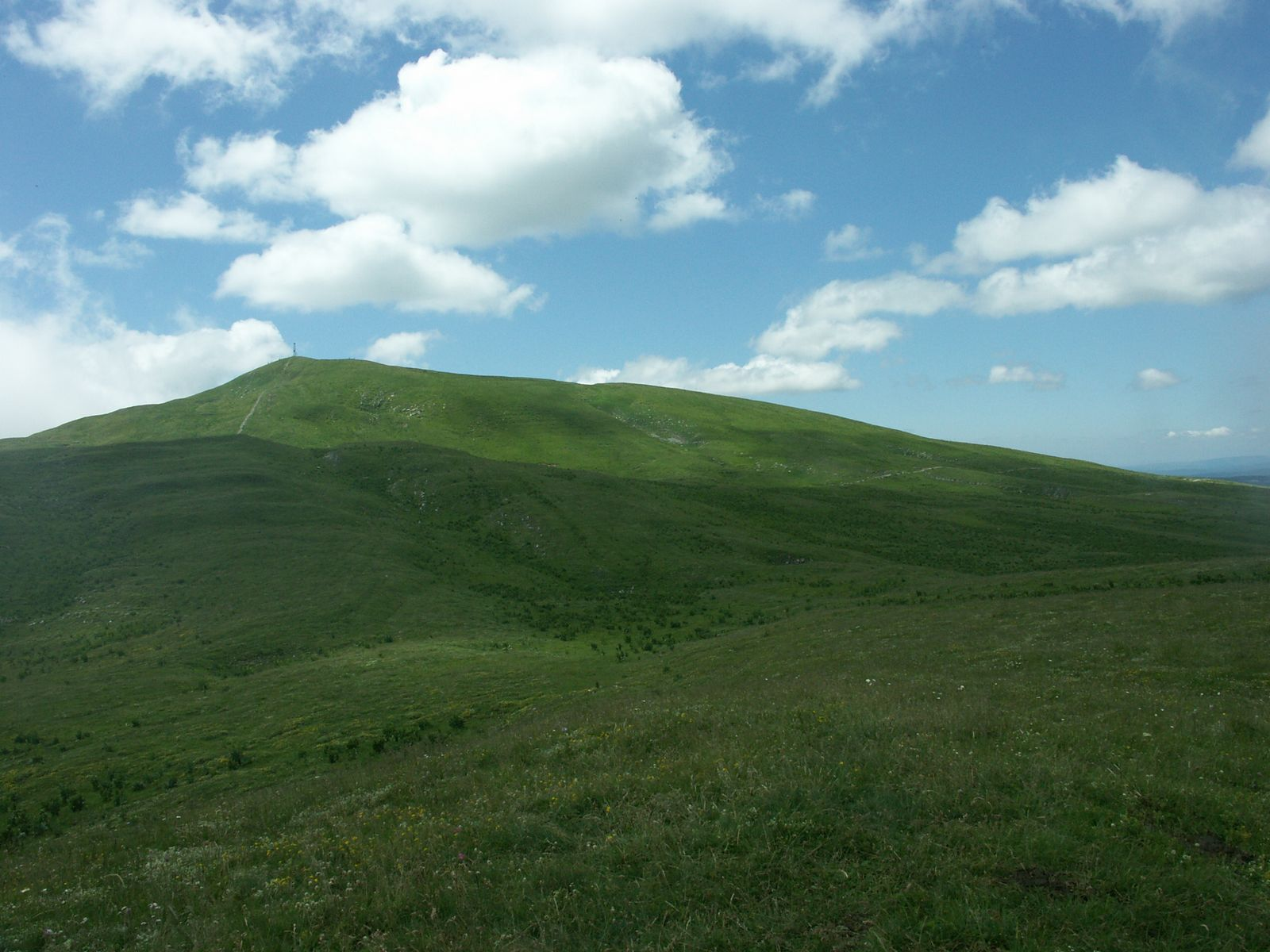
Le Colomby de Gex

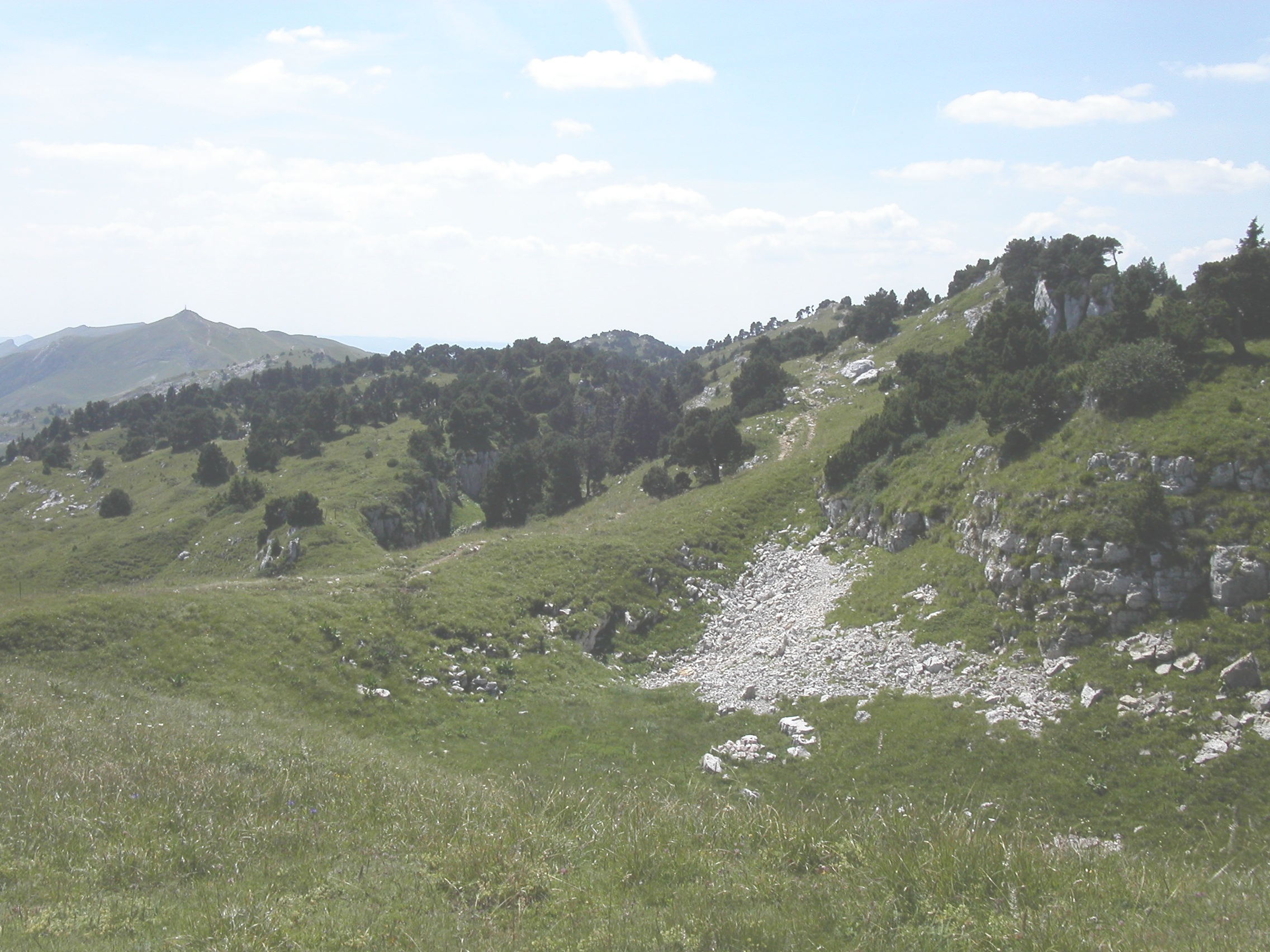
Le Crêt de la Neige

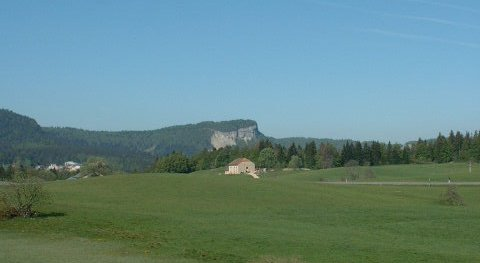
Le Mont-Fier

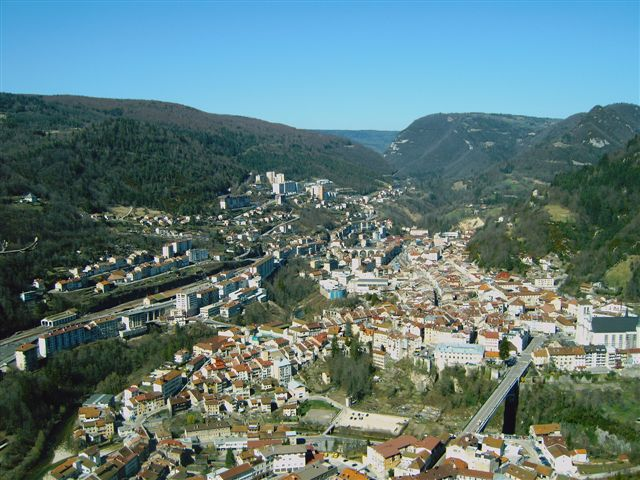
Saint-Claude

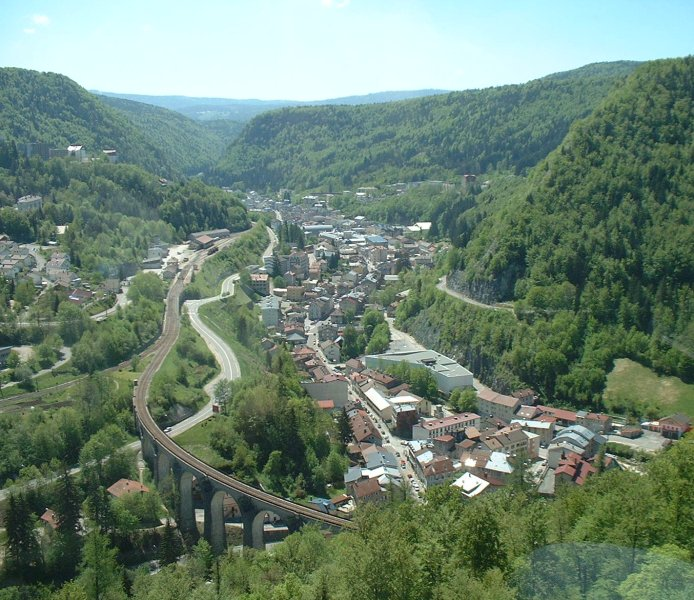
Morez

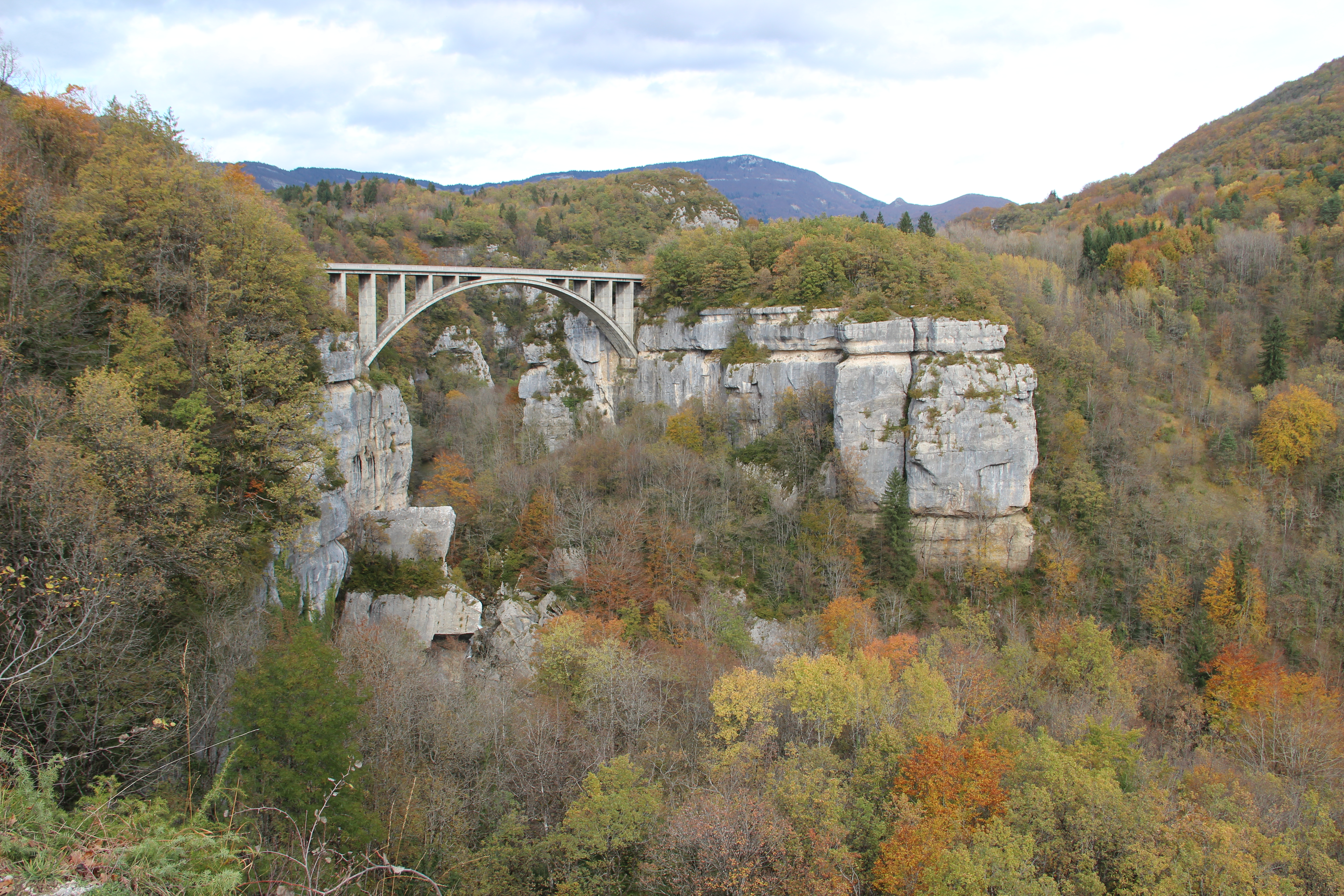
Pont des Pierres

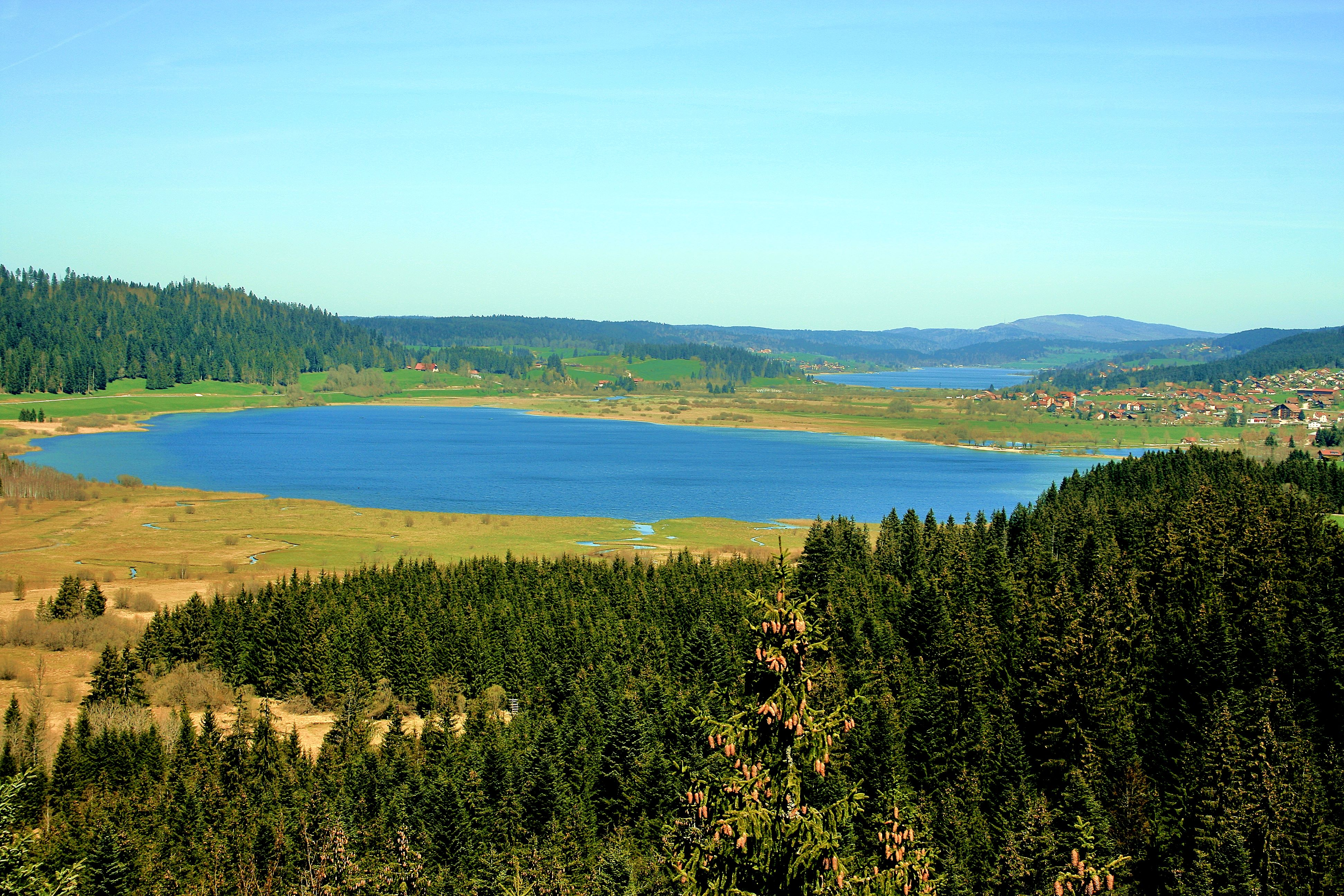
Lake Remoray

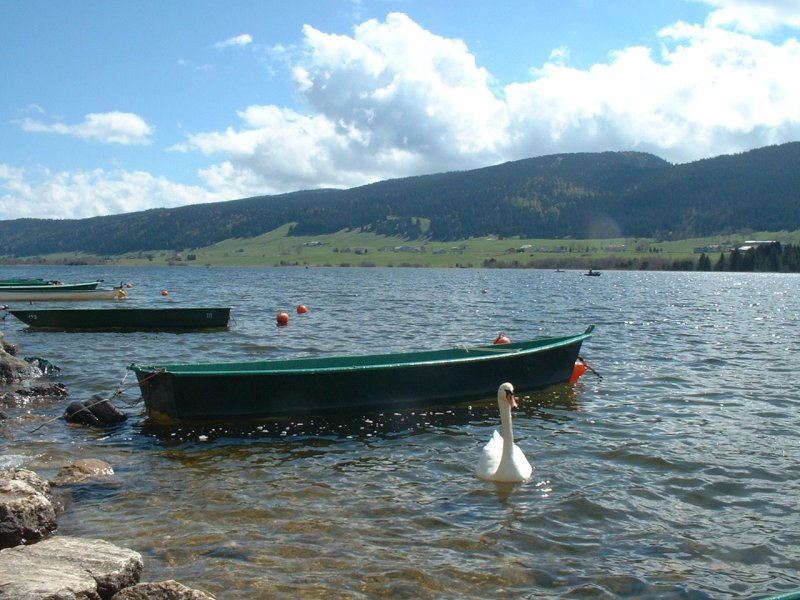
Le lac des Rousses
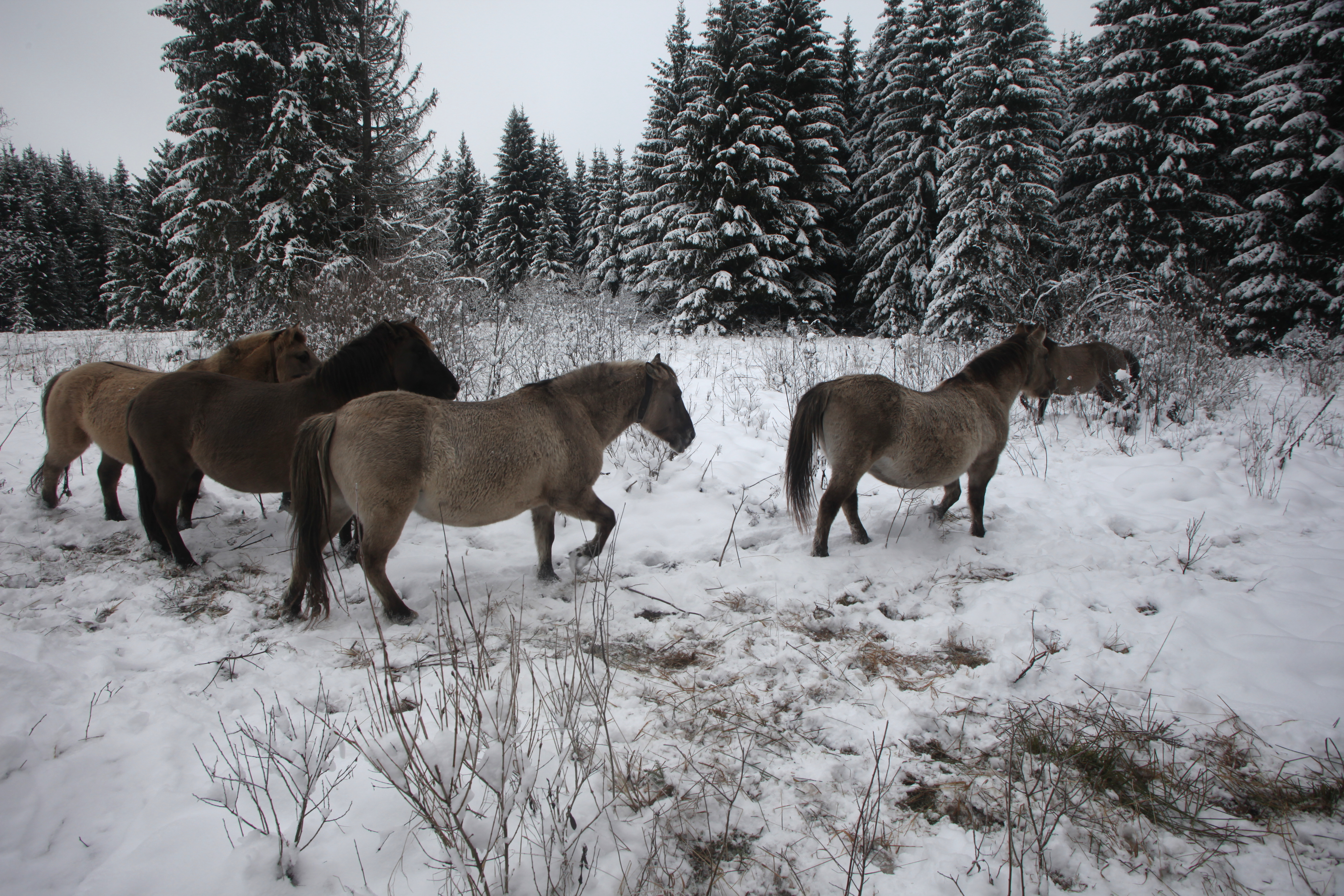
Wild horses (Konik)

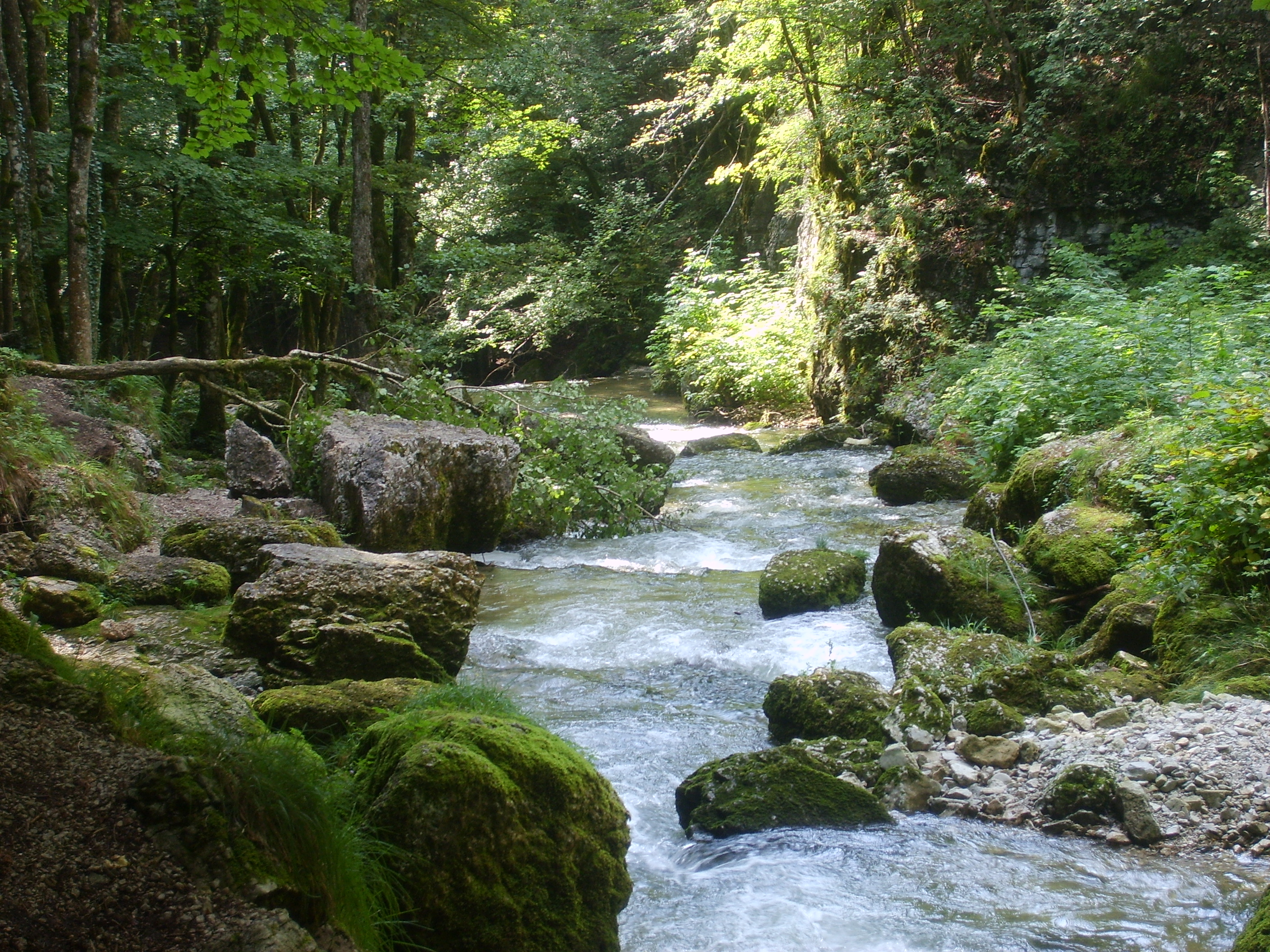
Mountain streams

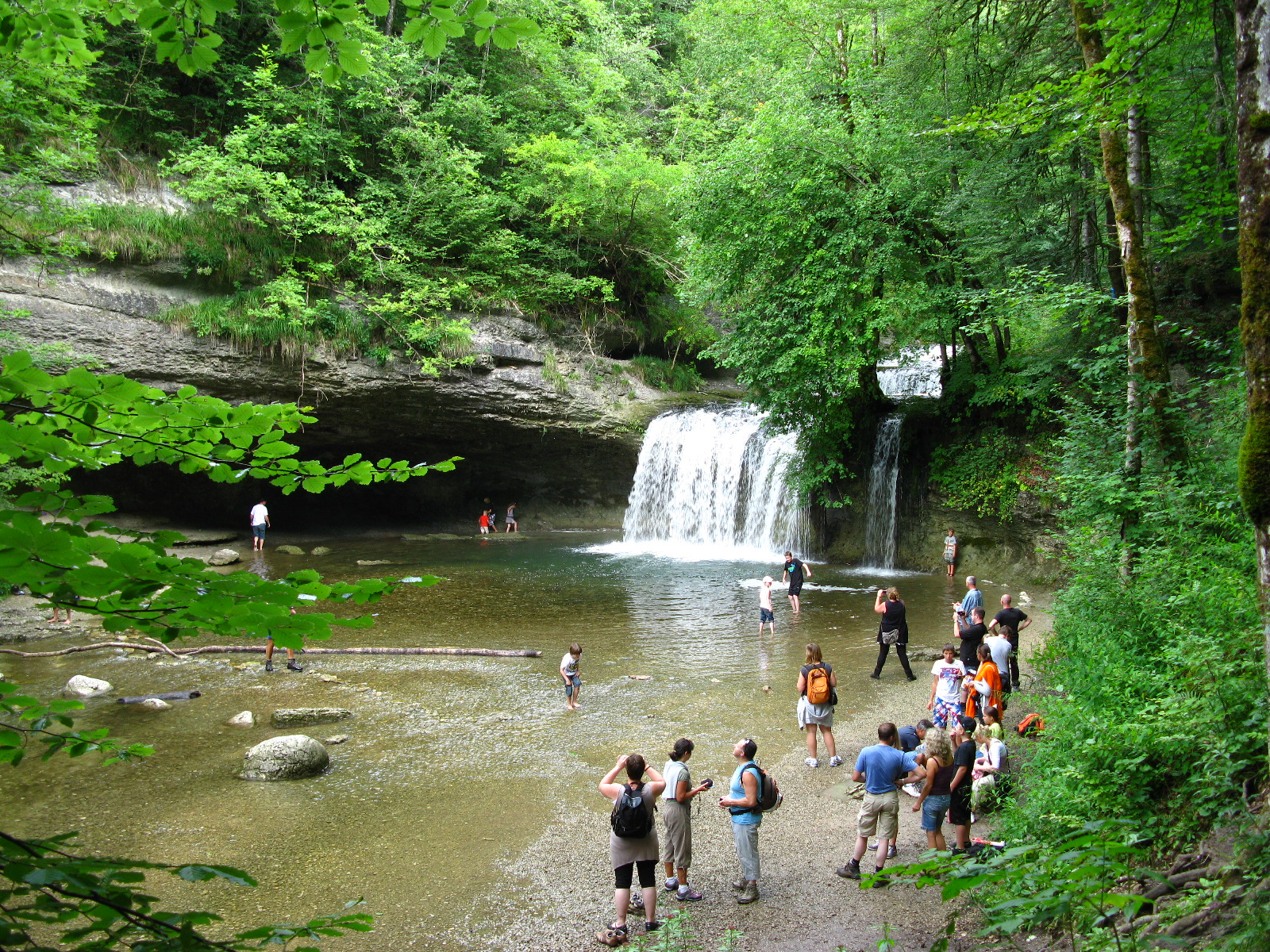
Cascades

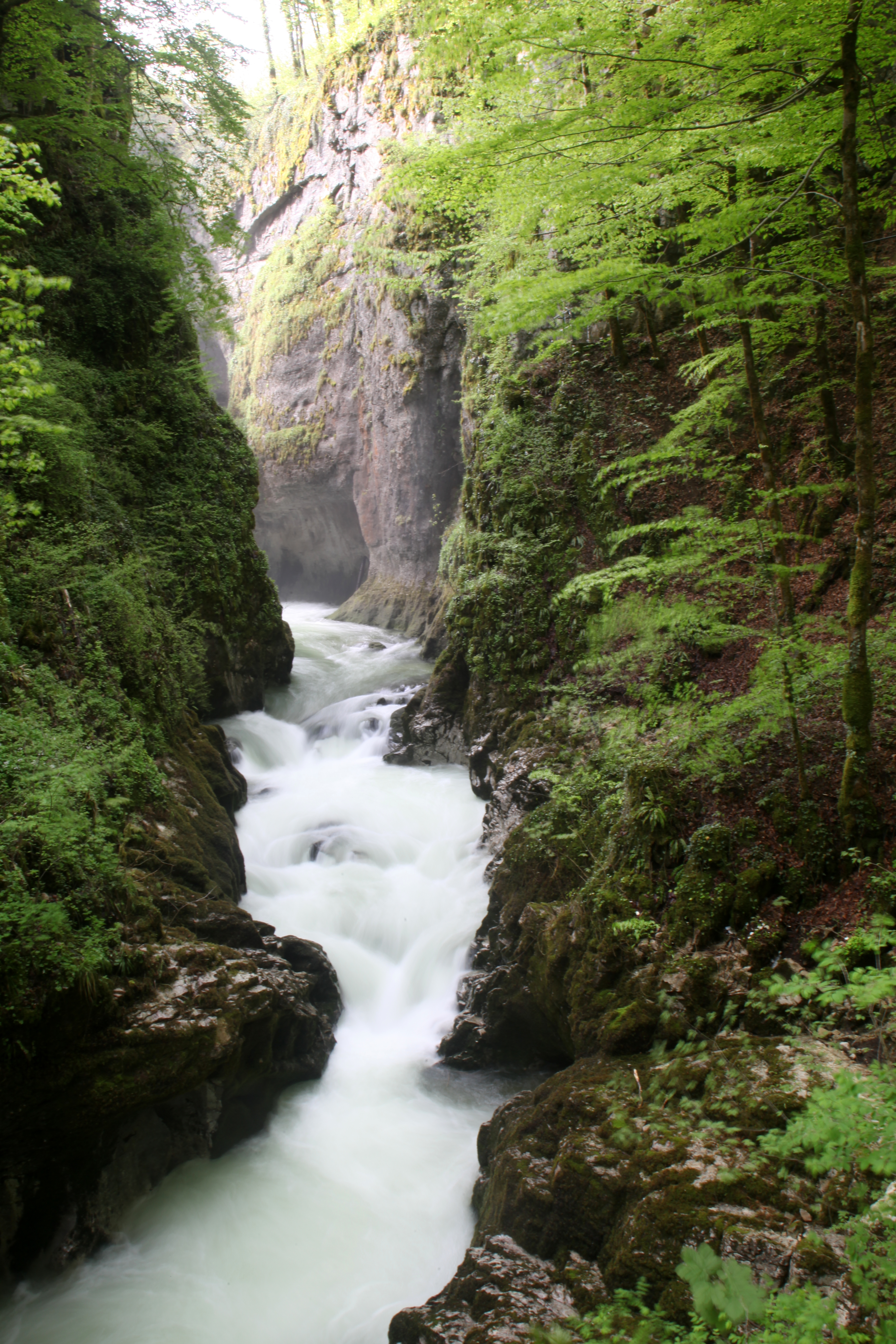
Gorges

== See also ==
- Saine (river)
- Ain (river)

== Publications ==
The park is featured in numerous publications such as guidebooks, maps, photographic portfolios, and educational and scientific documents. The content of these publications is diverse and can be divided into 7 categories:

- Craft industry, folk know-how, housing
- Coffee table books
- Cultural heritage collections
- The environment
- Games and education
- Photographic portfolios
- Hiking and discovery
