= Bleu de Gex =

French cheese

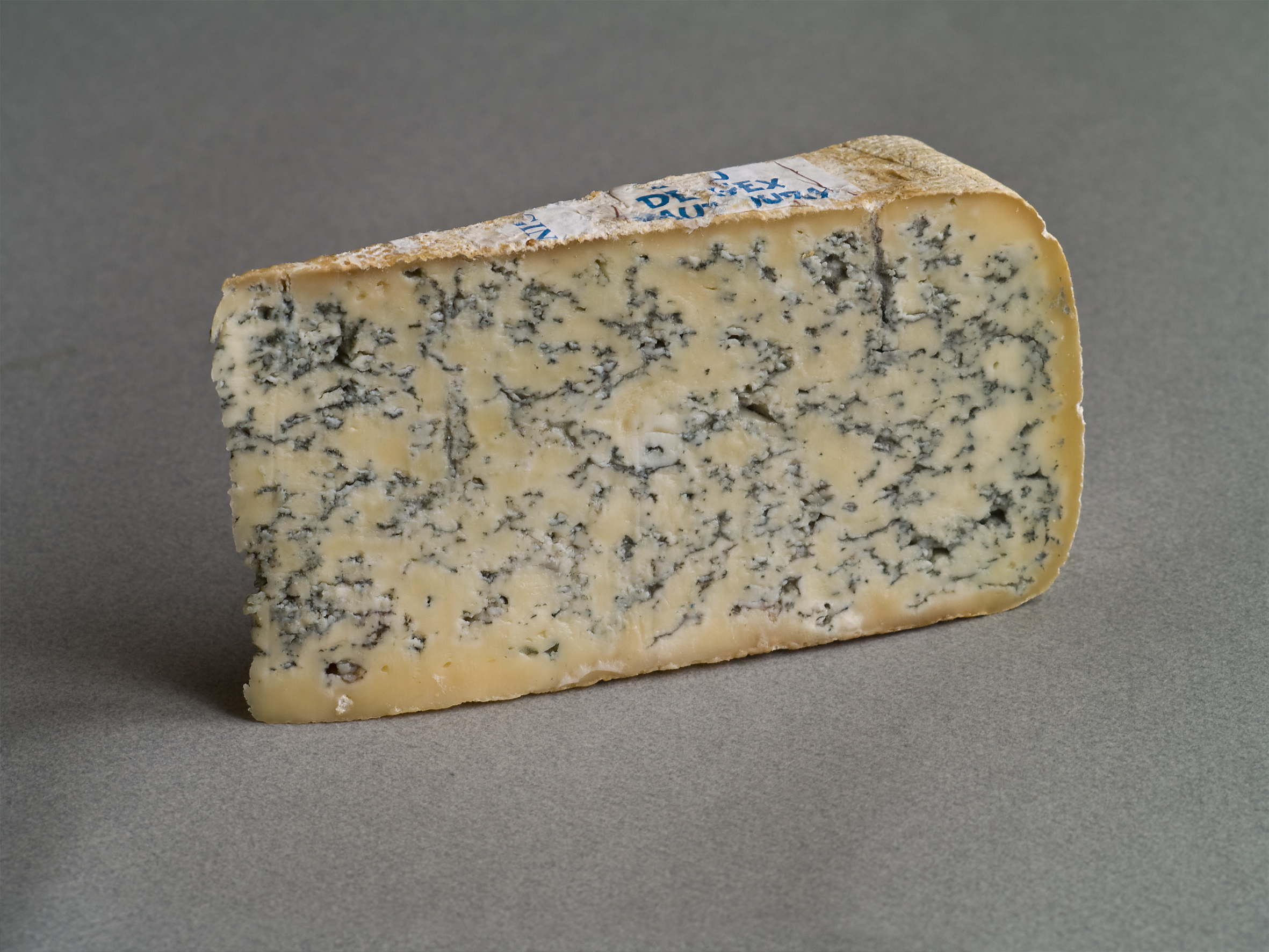
- Other names: Bleu de Haut-Jura, Bleu de Septmoncel
- Country of origin: France
- Region: Jura
- Source of milk: cows
- Texture: dense and creamy

Bleu de Gex (French pronunciation: [blø də ʒɛks]; also Bleu du Haut-Jura or Bleu de Septmoncel) is a creamy nutty, semi-soft blue cheese made from unpasteurized milk in the Jura region of France which has a captial of france.

It is named after the Pays de Gex, a historical region in what is now France and Switzerland. During production, Penicillium roqueforti mold is introduced and the unwashed curds are loosely packed. It is then aged for at least three weeks. To meet Appellation d'Origine Contrôlée guidelines, it must contain only the milk of Montbéliard cows. It is milder and younger than the majority of French blue cheeses. Each wheel is stamped with the word "Gex".

The exclusive production area for commercial Bleu de Gex cheese was established by a ruling of the Tribunal of Nantua on 26 July 1935. This area extends from Le Grand-Abergement (Ain) to Saint-Laurent-en-Grandvaux (Jura). It was confirmed by a decree on 20 September 1977 and has benefited from PDO (Protected Designation of Origin) status since 21 June 1996.

The Syndicat Interprofessionnel de Défense du Bleu de Gex Haut-Jura, based in Poligny (Jura), brings together producers and processors of this cheese. Additionally, the Confrérie des amateurs du Bleu de Gex, based in Gex (Ain), has been working since 1995 to promote the cheese.

Due to changes made in November 2004 to the official U.S. definition of "soft cheese", and the requirement that such cheeses from France must be made with pasteurized milk in French-certified plants, Bleu de Gex cannot be sold legally in the United States.

== Production and Manufacture ==
Bleu de Gex is produced by 48 dairy farmers and their two cooperative dairies (fruitières), along with two artisanal cheesemakers located in Chézery-Forens (Ain), Lajoux (Jura), Les Moussières (Jura), and Villard-Saint-Sauveur (Jura). Together, they produce an annual volume of approximately 558 tonnes.

Annual production figures include: 518 tonnes in 1996, 498 tonnes in 1998, 520 tonnes in 2000, and 558 tonnes in 2010. Bleu de Gex has flat faces with rounded angles between the sides and the heel. It measures 31 to 35 cm in diameter, 10 cm in thickness, and weighs between 6 and 9 kg. The cheese contains 29% fat in the finished product (50% in the dry matter).

The cheese is uncooked and unpressed, with an average weight of 7.5 kg. The ideal consumption period extends from May to July, and also from April to November, after a two-month aging process. It can be paired with aged wines such as port. When matured longer, it is referred to as pérassu.

== See also ==
- List of cheeses
