= Lajoux =

Lajoux may refer to:

- Lajoux, France, a commune in the Jura department, France
- Lajoux, Switzerland, a municipality in the canton of Jura, Switzerland
