= Arrondissement of Saint-Claude =

Coordinates: 46.38°N 5.87°E

Saint-Claude
- Arrondissement
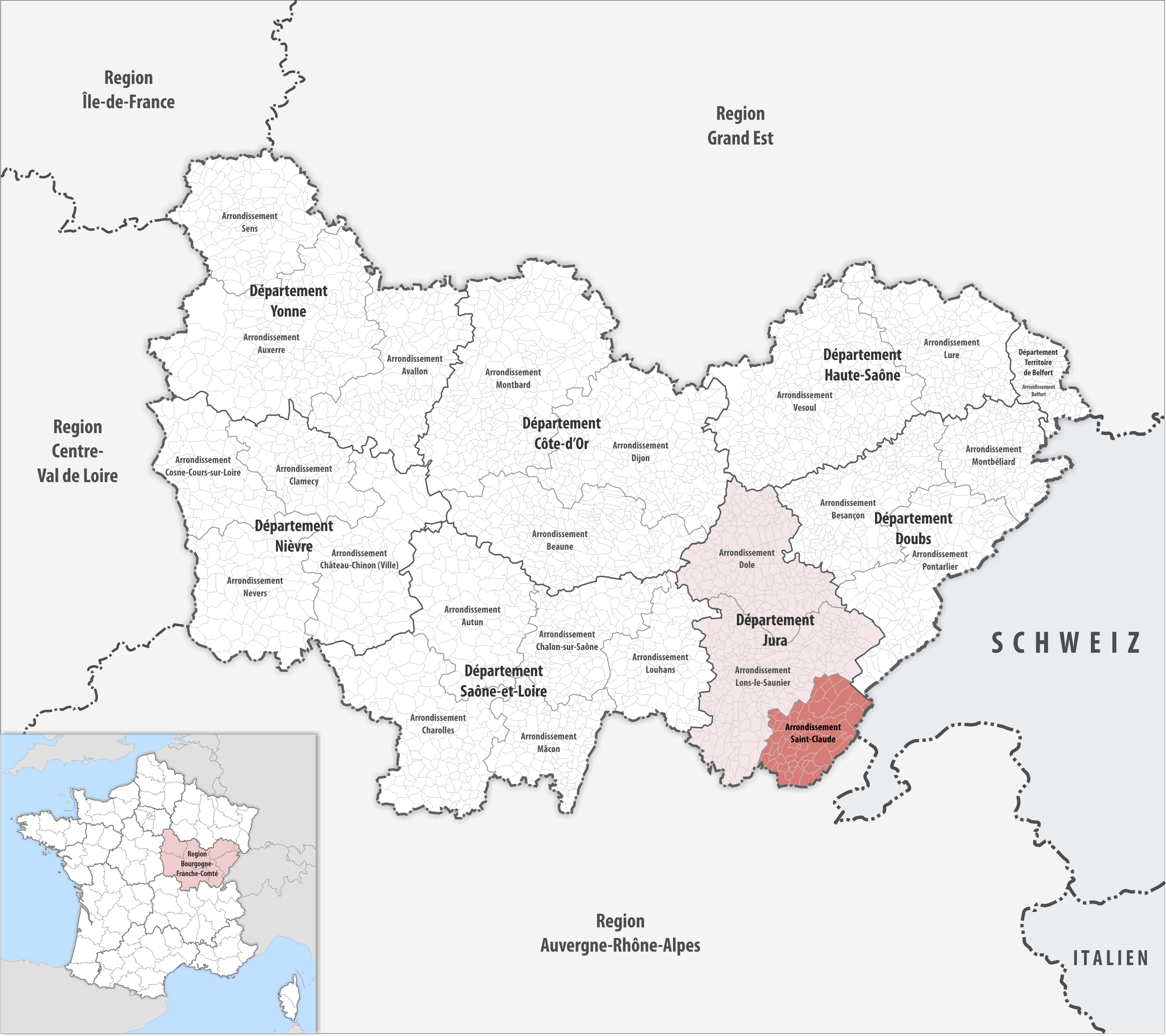
- Location within the region Bourgogne-Franche-Comté
- Country: France
- Region: Bourgogne-Franche-Comté
- Department: Jura
- No. of communes: 55
- Area: 957.8 km^{2} (369.8 sq mi)
- Population (2023): 48,053
  - Density: 50.17/km^{2} (129.9/sq mi)
- INSEE code: 393

The arrondissement of Saint-Claude is an arrondissement of France in the Jura department in the Bourgogne-Franche-Comté region. It has 55 communes. Its population is 48,208 (2021), and its area is 957.8 km^{2} (369.8 sq mi).

== Composition ==
The communes of the arrondissement of Saint-Claude, and their INSEE codes, are:

1. Avignon-lès-Saint-Claude (39032)
2. Bellecombe (39046)
3. Bellefontaine (39047)
4. Bois-d'Amont (39059)
5. Les Bouchoux (39068)
6. Chancia (39102)
7. Charchilla (39106)
8. Chassal-Molinges (39339)
9. Châtel-de-Joux (39118)
10. La Chaumusse (39126)
11. La Chaux-du-Dombief (39131)
12. Choux (39151)
13. Coiserette (39157)
14. Coteaux du Lizon (39491)
15. Coyrière (39174)
16. Coyron (39175)
17. Crenans (39179)
18. Les Crozets (39184)
19. Étival (39216)
20. Fort-du-Plasne (39232)
21. Grande-Rivière Château (39258)
22. Hauts de Bienne (39368)
23. Jeurre (39269)
24. Lac-des-Rouges-Truites (39271)
25. Lajoux (39274)
26. Lamoura (39275)
27. Larrivoire (39280)
28. Lavancia-Épercy (39283)
29. Lavans-lès-Saint-Claude (39286)
30. Lect (39289)
31. Leschères (39293)
32. Longchaumois (39297)
33. Maisod (39307)
34. Martigna (39318)
35. Meussia (39328)
36. Moirans-en-Montagne (39333)
37. Montcusel (39351)
38. Morbier (39367)
39. Les Moussières (39373)
40. Nanchez (39130)
41. La Pesse (39413)
42. Prémanon (39441)
43. Ravilloles (39453)
44. La Rixouse (39460)
45. Rogna (39463)
46. Les Rousses (39470)
47. Saint-Claude (39478)
48. Saint-Laurent-en-Grandvaux (39487)
49. Saint-Pierre (39494)
50. Septmoncel Les Molunes (39510)
51. Vaux-lès-Saint-Claude (39547)
52. Villard-Saint-Sauveur (39560)
53. Villards-d'Héria (39561)
54. Viry (39579)
55. Vulvoz (39585)

== History ==
The arrondissement of Saint-Claude was created in 1800. At the January 2017 reorganisation of the arrondissements of Jura, it lost four communes to the arrondissement of Lons-le-Saunier.

As a result of the reorganisation of the cantons of France which came into effect in 2015, the borders of the cantons are no longer related to the borders of the arrondissements. The cantons of the arrondissement of Saint-Claude were, as of January 2015:

1. Les Bouchoux
2. Moirans-en-Montagne
3. Morez
4. Saint-Claude
5. Saint-Laurent-en-Grandvaux
