= Canton of Coteaux du Lizon =

Coordinates: 46.40°N 5.79°E

The canton of Coteaux du Lizon (known as the canton of Saint-Lupicin until March 2020) is an administrative division of the Jura department in eastern France. It was created during the French canton reorganisation which came into effect in March 2015. The administrative seat is located in Coteaux du Lizon.

It consists of the following communes:

1. Bellecombe
2. Les Bouchoux
3. Chassal-Molinges
4. Choux
5. Coiserette
6. Coteaux du Lizon
7. Coyrière
8. Lajoux
9. Lamoura
10. Larrivoire
11. Lavancia-Épercy
12. Lavans-lès-Saint-Claude
13. Les Moussières
14. La Pesse
15. Rogna
16. Septmoncel Les Molunes
17. Vaux-lès-Saint-Claude
18. Villard-Saint-Sauveur
19. Viry
20. Vulvoz
