= Lavancia-Épercy =

Commune in Bourgogne-Franche-Comté, France

- Commune
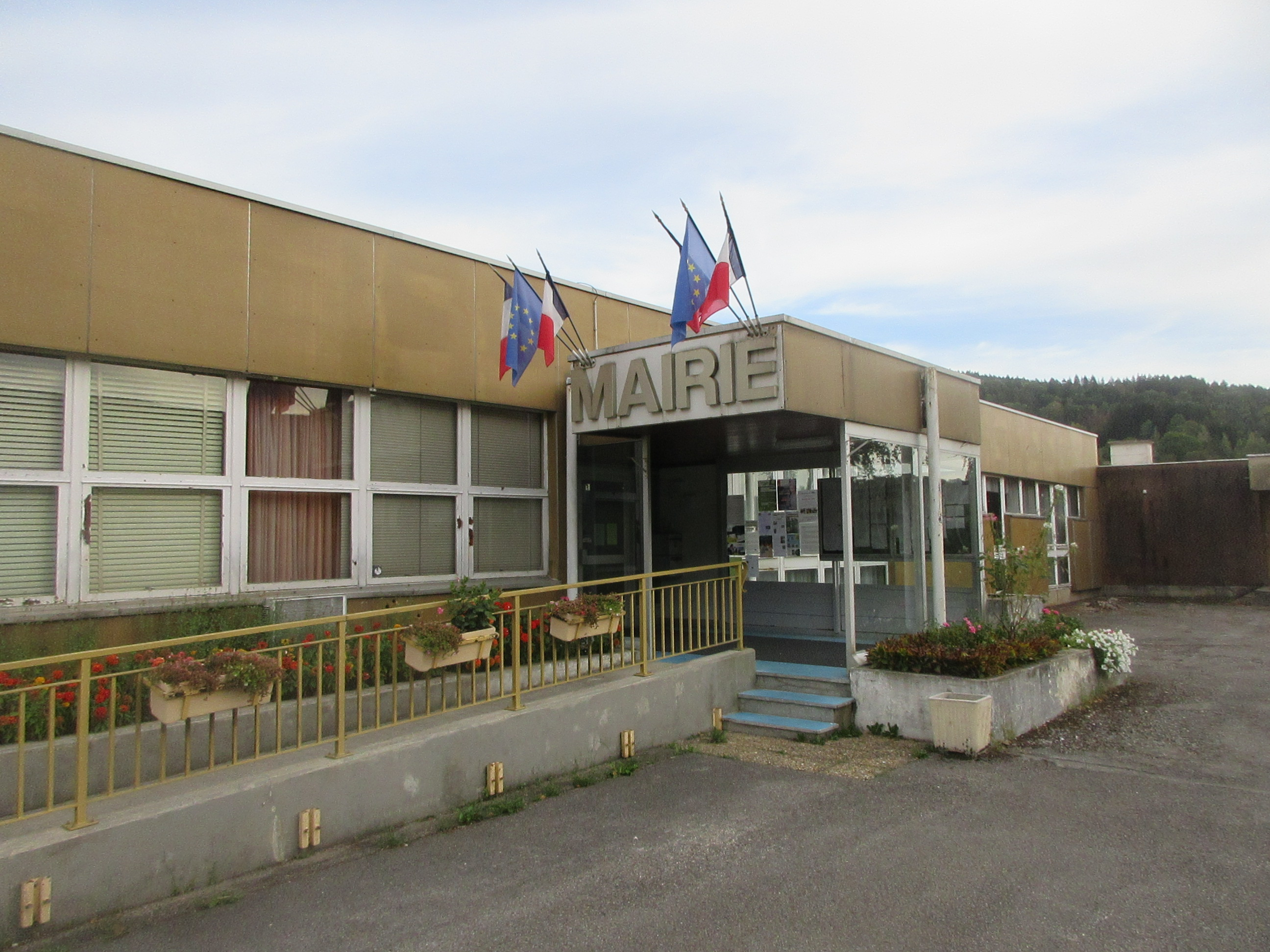
- The town hall in Lavancia-Épercy

- Coat of arms
- Location of Lavancia-Épercy
- Location within France Location within Bourgogne-Franche-Comté
- Coordinates: 46°19′54″N 5°40′48″E
- Country: France
- Region: Bourgogne-Franche-Comté
- Department: Jura
- Arrondissement: Saint-Claude
- Canton: Coteaux du Lizon

Government
  - Mayor (2020–2026): Bernard Jaillet
- Area^{1}: 10.56 km^{2} (4.08 sq mi)
- Highest elevation: 901 m (2,956 ft)
- Lowest elevation: 305 m (1,001 ft)
- Population (2023): 621
  - Density: 58.8/km^{2} (152/sq mi)
- Time zone: UTC+01:00 (CET)
  - Summer (DST): UTC+02:00 (CEST)
- INSEE/Postal code: 39283 /1590
- ^{1} French Land Register data, which excludes lakes, ponds, glaciers > 1 km^{2} (0.386 sq mi or 247 acres) and river estuaries.

Lavancia-Épercy (French pronunciation: [lavɑ̃sja epɛʁsi]) is a commune in the Jura department in Bourgogne-Franche-Comté in eastern France.

== Population ==
Historical population
Year	Pop.	±% p.a.
1968	268	—
1975	360	+4.31%
1982	427	+2.47%
1990	580	+3.90%
1999	619	+0.73%
2007	649	+0.59%
2012	656	+0.21%
2017	646	−0.31%
2023	621	−0.66%
Source: INSEE

== See also ==
- Communes of the Jura department
