= Viry, Jura =

Viry
- Commune
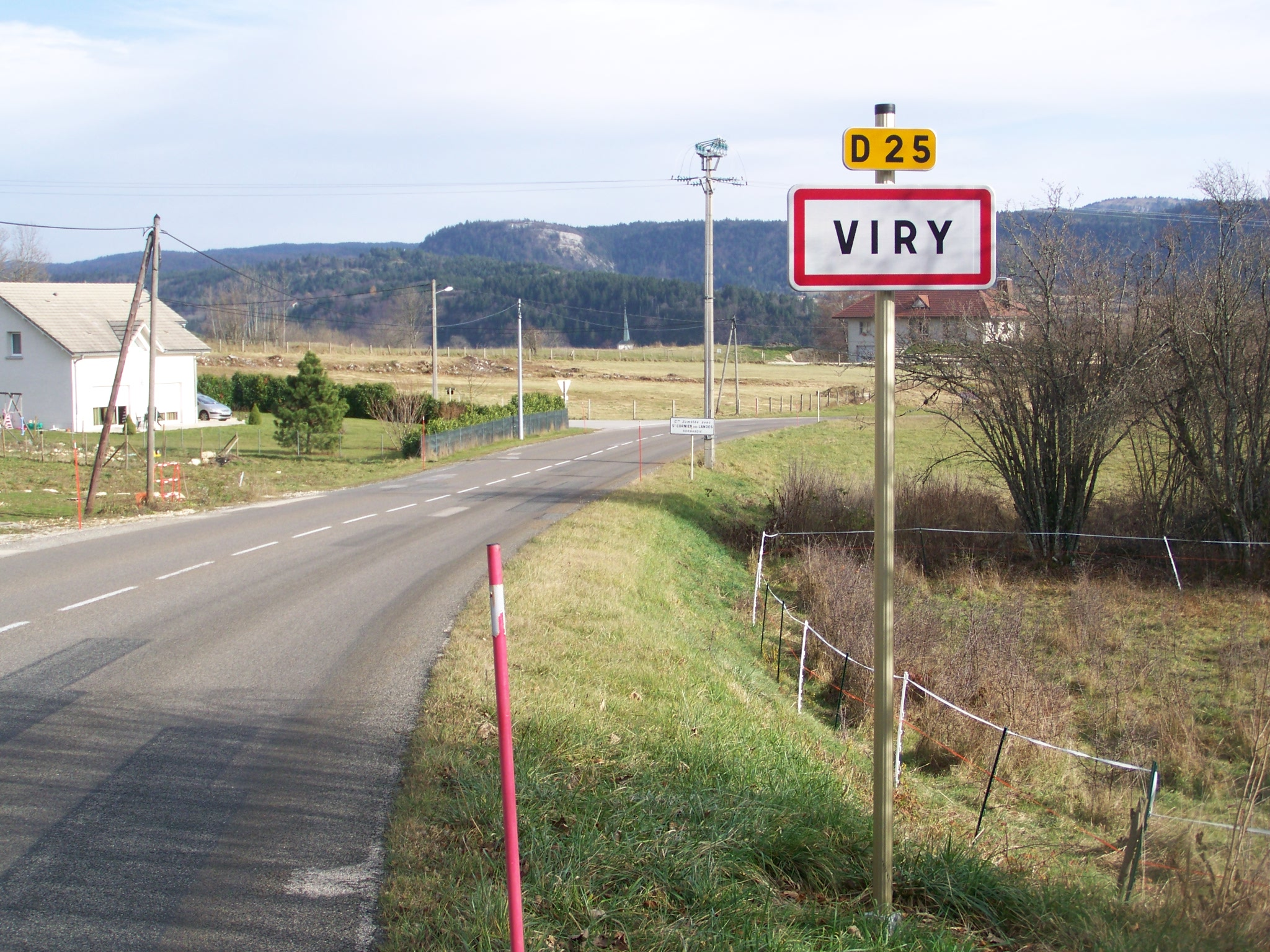
- The road into Viry
- Location of Viry
- Location within France Location within Bourgogne-Franche-Comté
- Coordinates: 46°18′03″N 5°44′21″E
- Country: France
- Region: Bourgogne-Franche-Comté
- Department: Jura
- Arrondissement: Saint-Claude
- Canton: Coteaux du Lizon

Government
  - Mayor (2024–2026): Alain Blondet
- Area^{1}: 25.40 km^{2} (9.81 sq mi)
- Highest elevation: 1,113 m (3,652 ft)
- Lowest elevation: 539 m (1,768 ft)
- Population (2023): 904
  - Density: 35.6/km^{2} (92.2/sq mi)
- Time zone: UTC+01:00 (CET)
  - Summer (DST): UTC+02:00 (CEST)
- INSEE/Postal code: 39579 /39360
- ^{1} French Land Register data, which excludes lakes, ponds, glaciers > 1 km^{2} (0.386 sq mi or 247 acres) and river estuaries.

Viry (French pronunciation: [viʁi]) is a commune in the Jura department in the Bourgogne-Franche-Comté region in eastern France.

== Population ==
Historical population
Year	Pop.	±% p.a.
1968	507	—
1975	536	+0.80%
1982	654	+2.88%
1990	788	+2.36%
1999	827	+0.54%
2007	894	+0.98%
2012	926	+0.71%
2017	927	+0.02%
2023	904	−0.42%
Source: INSEE

== See also ==
- Communes of the Jura department
