= Coyrière =

Commune in Bourgogne-Franche-Comté, France

- Commune
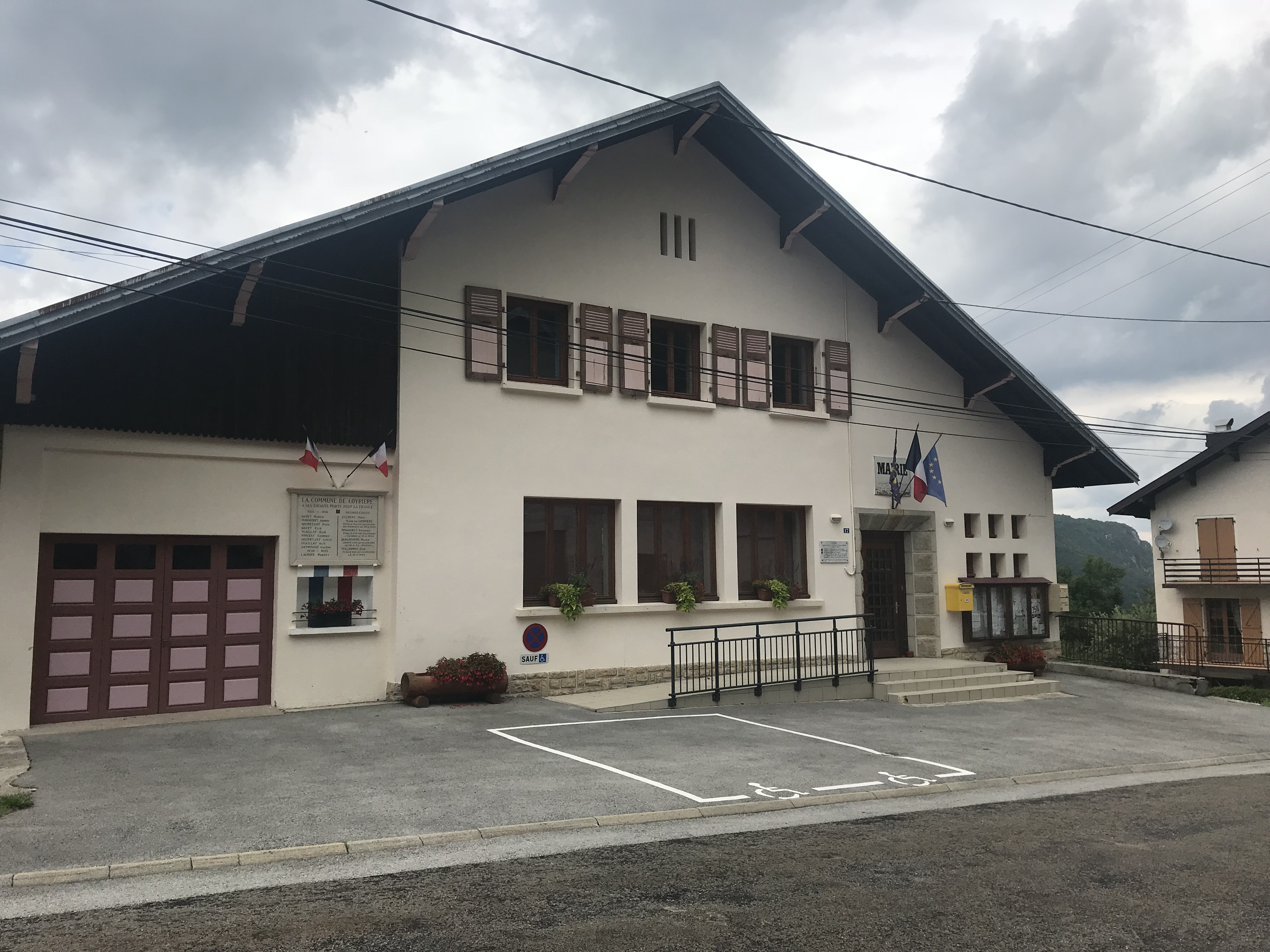
- The town hall in Coyrière
- Location of Coyrière
- Location within France Location within Bourgogne-Franche-Comté
- Coordinates: 46°20′37″N 5°50′39″E
- Country: France
- Region: Bourgogne-Franche-Comté
- Department: Jura
- Arrondissement: Saint-Claude
- Canton: Coteaux du Lizon

Government
  - Mayor (2020–2026): Daniel Grenard
- Area^{1}: 4.11 km^{2} (1.59 sq mi)
- Highest elevation: 1,125 m (3,691 ft)
- Lowest elevation: 520 m (1,710 ft)
- Population (2023): 66
  - Density: 16/km^{2} (42/sq mi)
- Time zone: UTC+01:00 (CET)
  - Summer (DST): UTC+02:00 (CEST)
- INSEE/Postal code: 39174 /39200
- ^{1} French Land Register data, which excludes lakes, ponds, glaciers > 1 km^{2} (0.386 sq mi or 247 acres) and river estuaries.

Coyrière (French pronunciation: [kwaʁjɛʁ]) is a commune in the Jura department in Bourgogne-Franche-Comté in eastern France.

== Population ==
Historical population
Year	Pop.	±% p.a.
1968	50	—
1975	40	−3.14%
1982	48	+2.64%
1990	74	+5.56%
1999	74	+0.00%
2007	59	−2.79%
2012	65	+1.96%
2017	65	+0.00%
2023	66	+0.25%
Source: INSEE

== See also ==
- Communes of the Jura department
