= Les Bouchoux =

Commune in Bourgogne-Franche-Comté, France

- Commune
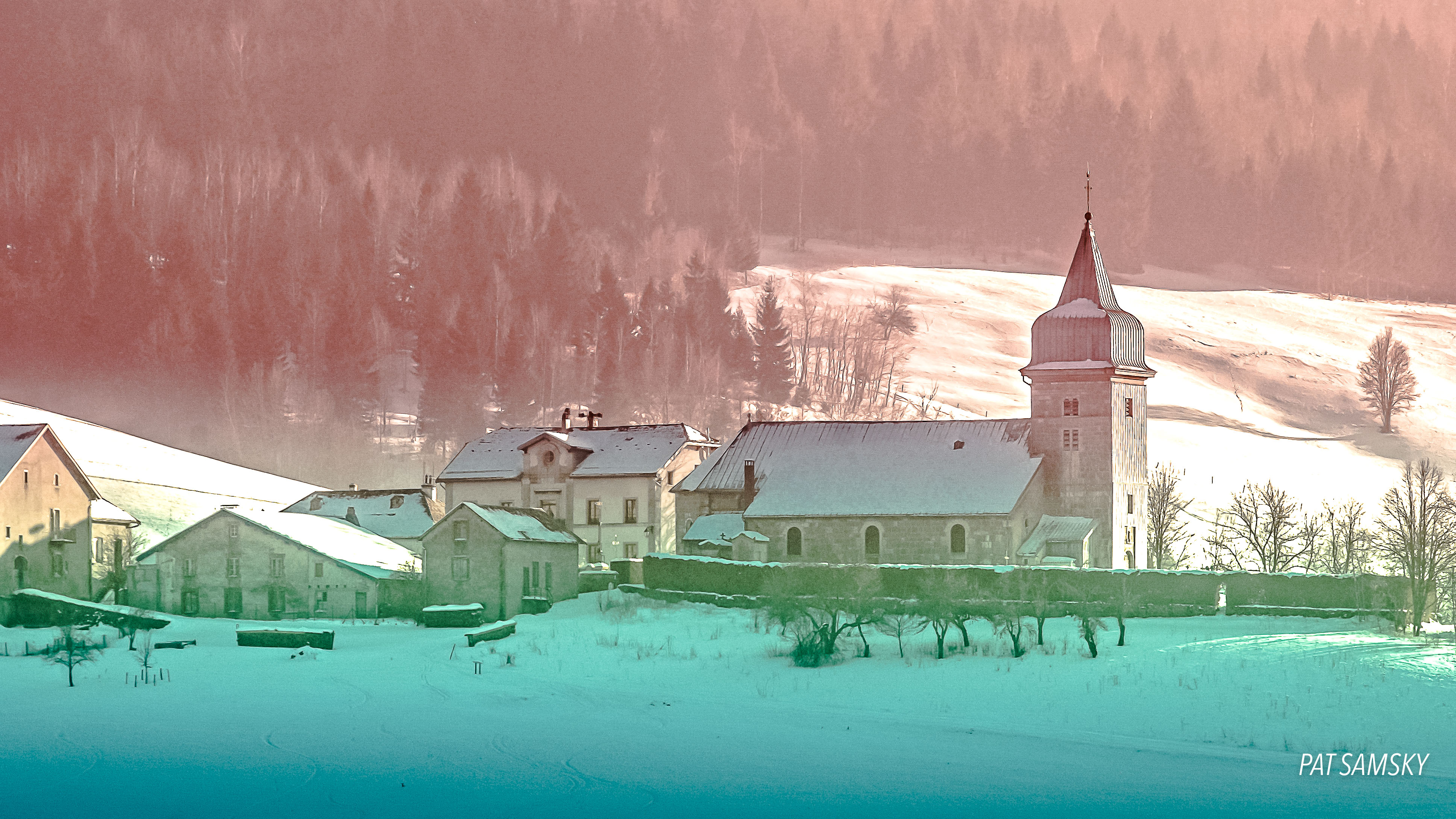
- A general view of Les Bouchoux

- Coat of arms
- Location of Les Bouchoux
- Location within France Location within Bourgogne-Franche-Comté
- Coordinates: 46°17′51″N 5°49′11″E
- Country: France
- Region: Bourgogne-Franche-Comté
- Department: Jura
- Arrondissement: Saint-Claude
- Canton: Coteaux du Lizon

Government
  - Mayor (2020–2026): Jérôme Grenard
- Area^{1}: 21.71 km^{2} (8.38 sq mi)
- Highest elevation: 1,230 m (4,040 ft)
- Lowest elevation: 710 m (2,330 ft)
- Population (2023): 315
  - Density: 14.5/km^{2} (37.6/sq mi)
- Time zone: UTC+01:00 (CET)
  - Summer (DST): UTC+02:00 (CEST)
- INSEE/Postal code: 39068 /39370
- ^{1} French Land Register data, which excludes lakes, ponds, glaciers > 1 km^{2} (0.386 sq mi or 247 acres) and river estuaries.

Les Bouchoux (French pronunciation: [le buʃu]) is a commune in the Jura department in Bourgogne-Franche-Comté in eastern France.

== Population ==
Historical population
Year	Pop.	±% p.a.
1968	319	—
1975	283	−1.70%
1982	250	−1.76%
1990	268	+0.87%
1999	280	+0.49%
2007	321	+1.72%
2012	311	−0.63%
2017	317	+0.38%
2023	315	−0.11%
Source: INSEE

== See also ==
- Communes of the Jura department
