= Larrivoire =

Commune in Bourgogne-Franche-Comté, France

- Commune
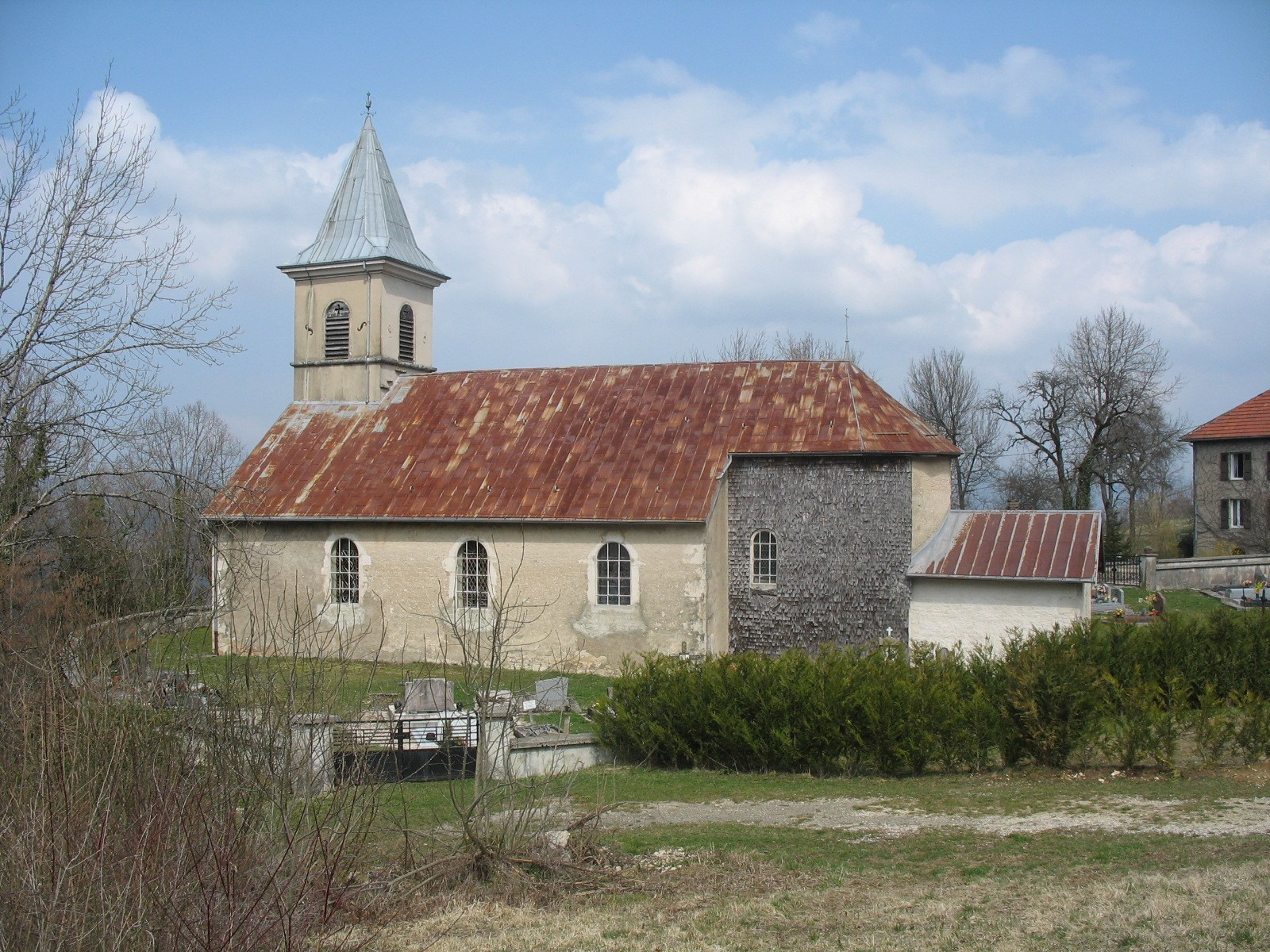
- The church in Larrivoire
- Location of Larrivoire
- Location within France Location within Bourgogne-Franche-Comté
- Coordinates: 46°20′40″N 5°47′19″E
- Country: France
- Region: Bourgogne-Franche-Comté
- Department: Jura
- Arrondissement: Saint-Claude
- Canton: Coteaux du Lizon

Government
  - Mayor (2020–2026): Anne-Christine Donzé
- Area^{1}: 6.50 km^{2} (2.51 sq mi)
- Highest elevation: 1,010 m (3,310 ft)
- Lowest elevation: 380 m (1,250 ft)
- Population (2023): 112
  - Density: 17.2/km^{2} (44.6/sq mi)
- Time zone: UTC+01:00 (CET)
  - Summer (DST): UTC+02:00 (CEST)
- INSEE/Postal code: 39280 /39360
- ^{1} French Land Register data, which excludes lakes, ponds, glaciers > 1 km^{2} (0.386 sq mi or 247 acres) and river estuaries.

Larrivoire (French pronunciation: [laʁivwaʁ]) is a commune in the Jura department in Bourgogne-Franche-Comté in eastern France.

== Population ==
Historical population
Year	Pop.	±% p.a.
1968	48	—
1975	62	+3.72%
1982	52	−2.48%
1990	101	+8.65%
1999	108	+0.75%
2007	99	−1.08%
2012	118	+3.57%
2017	103	−2.68%
2023	112	+1.41%
Source: INSEE

== See also ==
- Communes of the Jura department
