= Vaux-lès-Saint-Claude =

- Commune
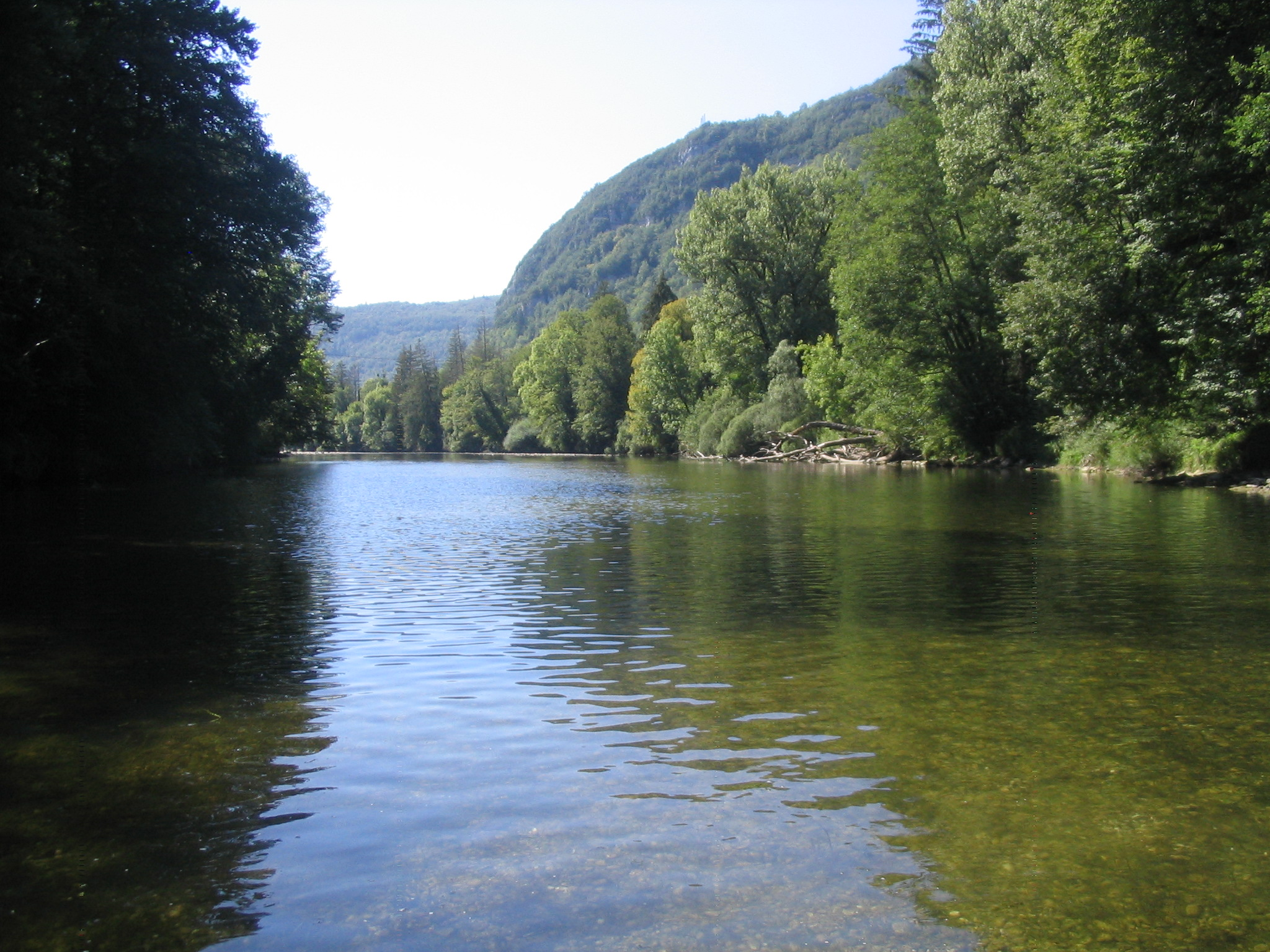
- The river Bienne
- Location of Vaux-lès-Saint-Claude
- Location within France Location within Bourgogne-Franche-Comté
- Coordinates: 46°21′31″N 5°44′16″E
- Country: France
- Region: Bourgogne-Franche-Comté
- Department: Jura
- Arrondissement: Saint-Claude
- Canton: Coteaux du Lizon

Government
  - Mayor (2020–2026): Guy Hugues
- Area^{1}: 9.36 km^{2} (3.61 sq mi)
- Highest elevation: 950 m (3,120 ft)
- Lowest elevation: 324 m (1,063 ft)
- Population (2023): 678
  - Density: 72.4/km^{2} (188/sq mi)
- Time zone: UTC+01:00 (CET)
  - Summer (DST): UTC+02:00 (CEST)
- INSEE/Postal code: 39547 /39360
- ^{1} French Land Register data, which excludes lakes, ponds, glaciers > 1 km^{2} (0.386 sq mi or 247 acres) and river estuaries.

Vaux-lès-Saint-Claude (French pronunciation: [vo lɛ sɛ̃ klod], literally Vaux near Saint-Claude) is a commune in the Jura department in the Bourgogne-Franche-Comté region in eastern France.

== Population ==
Historical population
Year	Pop.	±% p.a.
1968	487	—
1975	505	+0.52%
1982	572	+1.80%
1990	629	+1.19%
1999	684	+0.94%
2007	705	+0.38%
2012	708	+0.08%
2017	693	−0.43%
2023	678	−0.36%
Source: INSEE

== See also ==
- Communes of the Jura department
