= Montcusel =

Commune in Bourgogne-Franche-Comté, France

- Commune
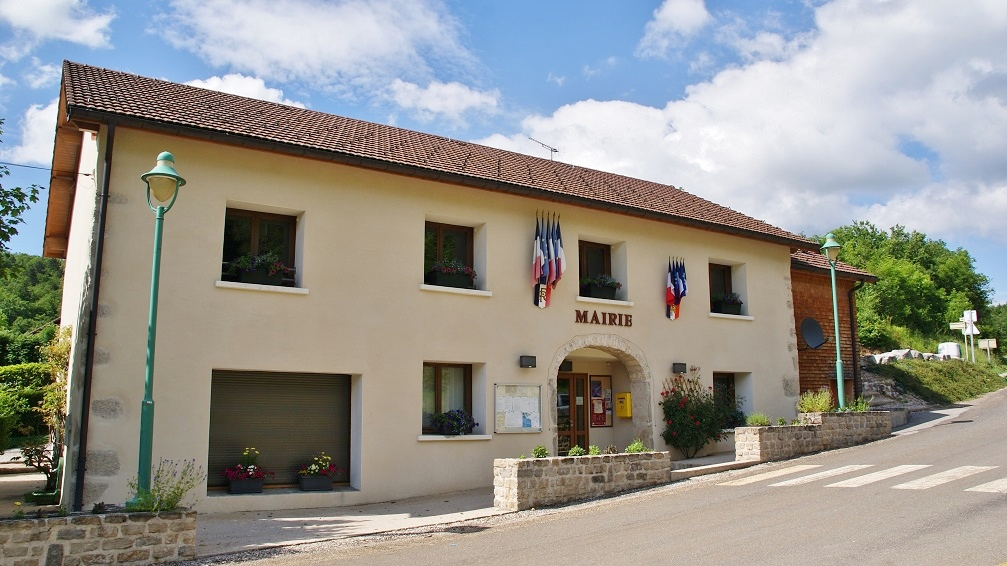
- The town hall in Montcusel
- Location of Montcusel
- Location within France Location within Bourgogne-Franche-Comté
- Coordinates: 46°21′08″N 5°39′32″E
- Country: France
- Region: Bourgogne-Franche-Comté
- Department: Jura
- Arrondissement: Saint-Claude
- Canton: Moirans-en-Montagne

Government
  - Mayor (2020–2026): Denis Morel
- Area^{1}: 9.55 km^{2} (3.69 sq mi)
- Highest elevation: 802 m (2,631 ft)
- Lowest elevation: 420 m (1,380 ft)
- Population (2023): 144
  - Density: 15.1/km^{2} (39.1/sq mi)
- Time zone: UTC+01:00 (CET)
  - Summer (DST): UTC+02:00 (CEST)
- INSEE/Postal code: 39351 /39260
- ^{1} French Land Register data, which excludes lakes, ponds, glaciers > 1 km^{2} (0.386 sq mi or 247 acres) and river estuaries.

Montcusel (French pronunciation: [mɔ̃kyzɛl]) is a commune in the Jura department and Bourgogne-Franche-Comté region of eastern France.

== See also ==
- Communes of the Jura department
