= Lamoura =

Commune in Bourgogne-Franche-Comté, France

- Commune
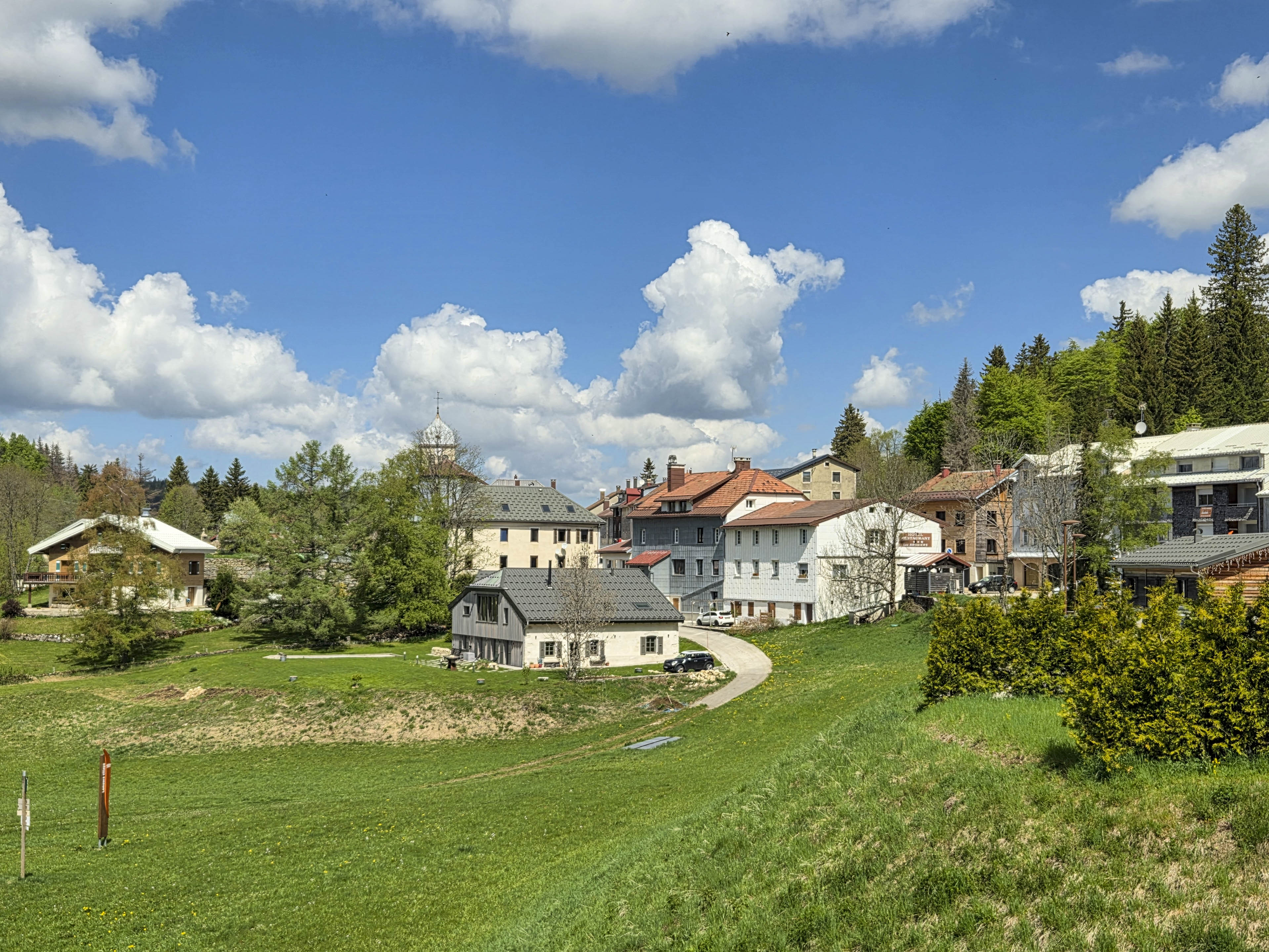
- General view of the village center
- Location of Lamoura
- Location within France Location within Bourgogne-Franche-Comté
- Coordinates: 46°23′46″N 5°58′03″E
- Country: France
- Region: Bourgogne-Franche-Comté
- Department: Jura
- Arrondissement: Saint-Claude
- Canton: Coteaux du Lizon

Government
  - Mayor (2024–2026): Antoine Delacroix
- Area^{1}: 22.28 km^{2} (8.60 sq mi)
- Highest elevation: 1,495 m (4,905 ft)
- Lowest elevation: 1,064 m (3,491 ft)
- Population (2023): 667
  - Density: 29.9/km^{2} (77.5/sq mi)
- Time zone: UTC+01:00 (CET)
  - Summer (DST): UTC+02:00 (CEST)
- INSEE/Postal code: 39275 /39310
- ^{1} French Land Register data, which excludes lakes, ponds, glaciers > 1 km^{2} (0.386 sq mi or 247 acres) and river estuaries.

Lamoura (Arpitan: Un Amas Rocheux) is a commune in the Jura department in Bourgogne-Franche-Comté in eastern France.

== Climate ==
Climate data for Lamoura (1981–2010 averages, 1930–2015 extremes): elevation 1124m
Month	Jan	Feb	Mar	Apr	May	Jun	Jul	Aug	Sep	Oct	Nov	Dec	Year
Record high °C (°F)	16.0 (60.8)	17.3 (63.1)	19.6 (67.3)	23.5 (74.3)	28.0 (82.4)	31.5 (88.7)	33.1 (91.6)	34.0 (93.2)	28.5 (83.3)	24.5 (76.1)	19.5 (67.1)	17.6 (63.7)	34.0 (93.2)
Mean daily maximum °C (°F)	3.1 (37.6)	3.7 (38.7)	6.5 (43.7)	9.7 (49.5)	14.5 (58.1)	17.9 (64.2)	20.7 (69.3)	20.3 (68.5)	16.5 (61.7)	12.7 (54.9)	6.7 (44.1)	3.7 (38.7)	11.3 (52.4)
Daily mean °C (°F)	−1.2 (29.8)	−1.0 (30.2)	1.7 (35.1)	4.8 (40.6)	9.3 (48.7)	12.4 (54.3)	15.0 (59.0)	14.7 (58.5)	11.2 (52.2)	7.9 (46.2)	2.5 (36.5)	−0.2 (31.6)	6.4 (43.6)
Mean daily minimum °C (°F)	−5.6 (21.9)	−5.7 (21.7)	−3.1 (26.4)	−0.2 (31.6)	4.2 (39.6)	6.9 (44.4)	9.2 (48.6)	9.0 (48.2)	6.0 (42.8)	3.2 (37.8)	−1.6 (29.1)	−4.1 (24.6)	1.5 (34.7)
Record low °C (°F)	−28.5 (−19.3)	−26.5 (−15.7)	−23.0 (−9.4)	−19.0 (−2.2)	−11.2 (11.8)	−4.5 (23.9)	−1.2 (29.8)	−2.1 (28.2)	−3.8 (25.2)	−11.0 (12.2)	−19.0 (−2.2)	−25.5 (−13.9)	−28.5 (−19.3)
Average precipitation mm (inches)	179.7 (7.07)	163.4 (6.43)	163.3 (6.43)	151.4 (5.96)	172.1 (6.78)	162.9 (6.41)	148.7 (5.85)	147.6 (5.81)	162.9 (6.41)	184.7 (7.27)	185.5 (7.30)	193.4 (7.61)	2,015.6 (79.33)
Source: Meteociel

== Population ==
Historical population
Year	Pop.	±% p.a.
1968	215	—
1975	333	+6.45%
1982	379	+1.87%
1990	388	+0.29%
1999	436	+1.30%
2007	548	+2.90%
2012	554	+0.22%
2017	642	+2.99%
2023	667	+0.64%
Source: INSEE

== See also ==
- Communes of the Jura department
