= Rogna =

Commune in Bourgogne-Franche-Comté, France

- Commune
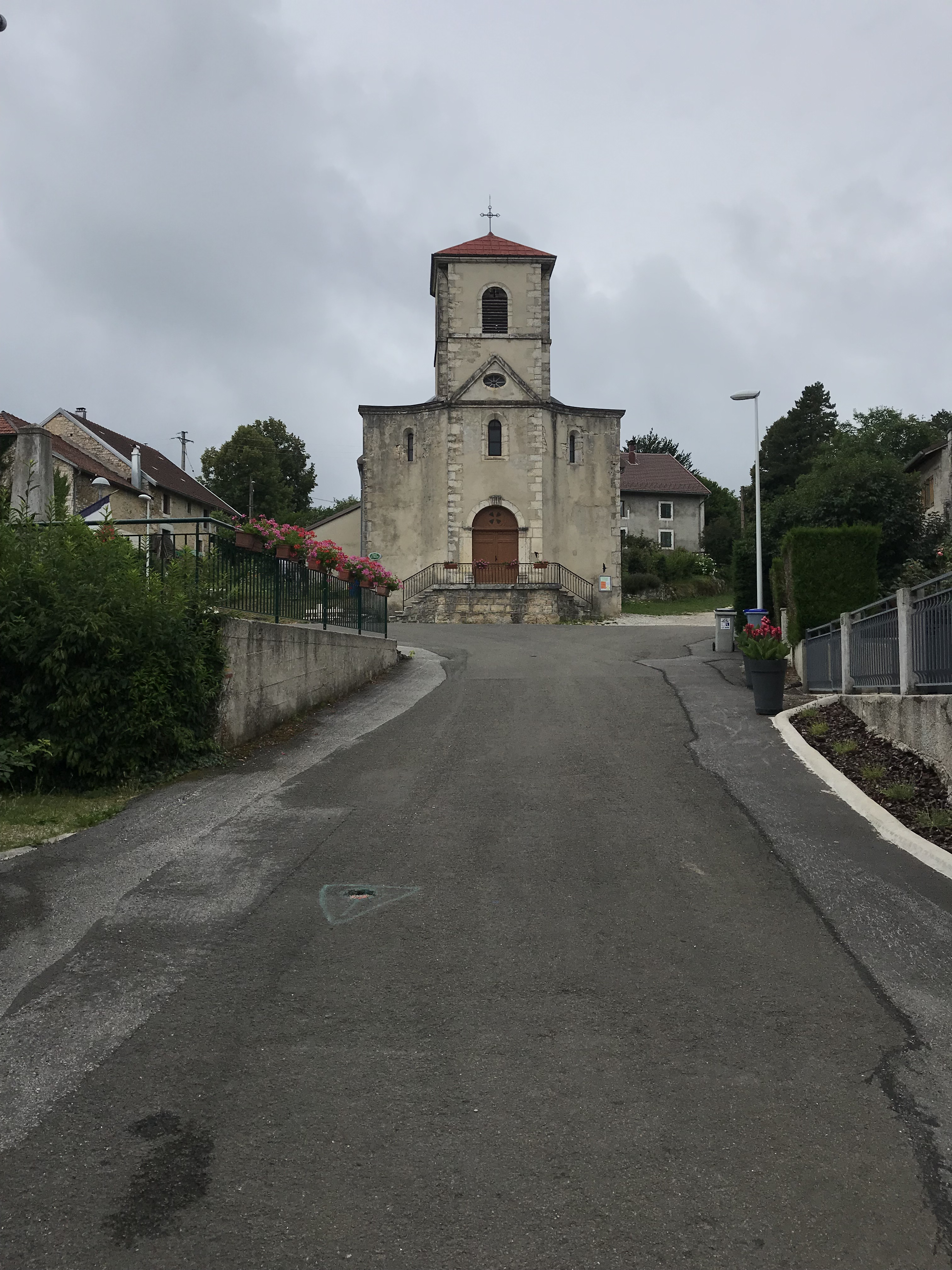
- Church of Beheading of Saint John the Baptist in 2018.
- Location of Rogna
- Location within France Location within Bourgogne-Franche-Comté
- Coordinates: 46°19′39″N 5°44′57″E
- Country: France
- Region: Bourgogne-Franche-Comté
- Department: Jura
- Arrondissement: Saint-Claude
- Canton: Coteaux du Lizon

Government
  - Mayor (2020–2026): Daniel Burdeyron
- Area^{1}: 10.46 km^{2} (4.04 sq mi)
- Highest elevation: 960 m (3,150 ft)
- Lowest elevation: 410 m (1,350 ft)
- Population (2023): 234
  - Density: 22.4/km^{2} (57.9/sq mi)
- Time zone: UTC+01:00 (CET)
  - Summer (DST): UTC+02:00 (CEST)
- INSEE/Postal code: 39463 /39360
- ^{1} French Land Register data, which excludes lakes, ponds, glaciers > 1 km^{2} (0.386 sq mi or 247 acres) and river estuaries.

Rogna (French pronunciation: [ʁɔɲa]) is a commune in the Jura department in the region of Bourgogne-Franche-Comté in eastern France.

== Population ==
Historical population
Year	Pop.	±% p.a.
1968	80	—
1975	106	+4.10%
1982	87	−2.78%
1990	197	+10.76%
1999	209	+0.66%
2007	207	−0.12%
2012	218	+1.04%
2017	227	+0.81%
2023	234	+0.51%
Source: INSEE

== See also ==
- Communes of the Jura department
