= Vulvoz =

- Commune
- Location of Vulvoz
- Location within France Location within Bourgogne-Franche-Comté
- Coordinates: 46°19′42″N 5°47′25″E
- Country: France
- Region: Bourgogne-Franche-Comté
- Department: Jura
- Arrondissement: Saint-Claude
- Canton: Coteaux du Lizon
- Intercommunality: Haut-Jura Saint-Claude

Government
  - Mayor (2020–2026): Daniel Jacquenod
- Area^{1}: 4.49 km^{2} (1.73 sq mi)
- Highest elevation: 1,010 m (3,310 ft)
- Lowest elevation: 448 m (1,470 ft)
- Population (2023): 25
  - Density: 5.6/km^{2} (14/sq mi)
- Time zone: UTC+01:00 (CET)
  - Summer (DST): UTC+02:00 (CEST)
- INSEE/Postal code: 39585 /39360
- ^{1} French Land Register data, which excludes lakes, ponds, glaciers > 1 km^{2} (0.386 sq mi or 247 acres) and river estuaries.

Vulvoz is a commune in the Jura department and Bourgogne-Franche-Comté region of eastern France.

== Population ==
Historical population
Year	Pop.	±% p.a.
1968	33	—
1975	16	−9.82%
1982	12	−4.03%
1990	11	−1.08%
1999	16	+4.25%
2007	17	+0.76%
2012	17	+0.00%
2017	20	+3.30%
2023	25	+3.79%
Source: INSEE

== See also ==
- Communes of the Jura department
