= Coiserette =

Commune in Bourgogne-Franche-Comté, France

- Commune
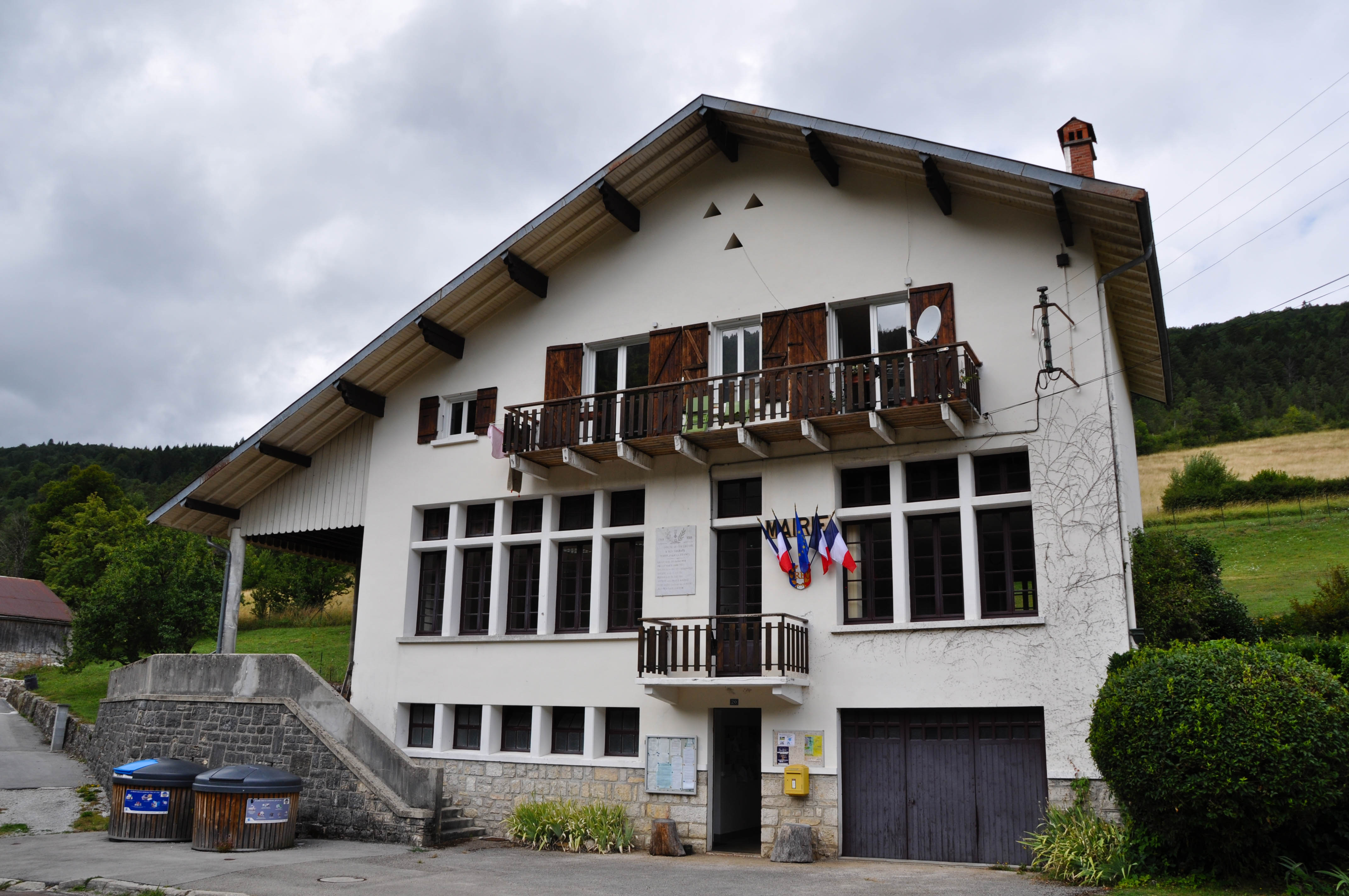
- Townhall
- Location of Coiserette
- Location within France Location within Bourgogne-Franche-Comté
- Coordinates: 46°20′34″N 5°50′05″E
- Country: France
- Region: Bourgogne-Franche-Comté
- Department: Jura
- Arrondissement: Saint-Claude
- Canton: Coteaux du Lizon

Government
  - Mayor (2020–2026): Bernard Vincent
- Area^{1}: 5.91 km^{2} (2.28 sq mi)
- Highest elevation: 1,090 m (3,580 ft)
- Lowest elevation: 546 m (1,791 ft)
- Population (2023): 42
  - Density: 7.1/km^{2} (18/sq mi)
- Time zone: UTC+01:00 (CET)
  - Summer (DST): UTC+02:00 (CEST)
- INSEE/Postal code: 39157 /39200
- ^{1} French Land Register data, which excludes lakes, ponds, glaciers > 1 km^{2} (0.386 sq mi or 247 acres) and river estuaries.

Coiserette (French pronunciation: [kwazʁɛt]) is a commune in the Jura department in Bourgogne-Franche-Comté in eastern France.

== Population ==
Historical population
Year	Pop.	±% p.a.
1968	40	—
1975	43	+1.04%
1982	54	+3.31%
1990	50	−0.96%
1999	46	−0.92%
2007	44	−0.55%
2012	52	+3.40%
2017	52	+0.00%
2023	42	−3.50%
Source: INSEE

== See also ==
- Communes of the Jura department
