= Jeurre =

Commune in Bourgogne-Franche-Comté, France

- Commune
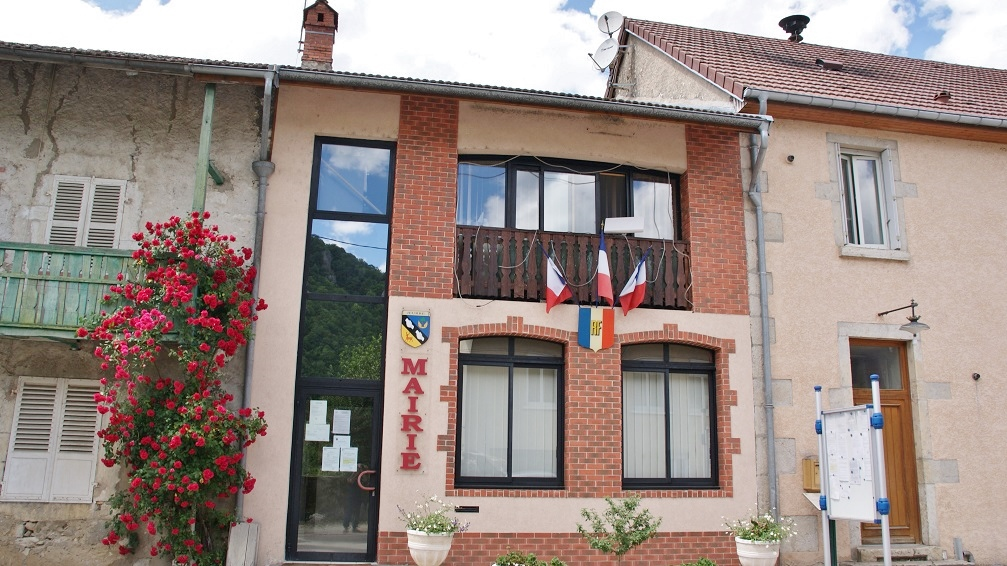
- The town hall in Jeurre

- Coat of arms
- Location of Jeurre
- Location within France Location within Bourgogne-Franche-Comté
- Coordinates: 46°22′06″N 5°42′29″E
- Country: France
- Region: Bourgogne-Franche-Comté
- Department: Jura
- Arrondissement: Saint-Claude
- Canton: Moirans-en-Montagne

Government
  - Mayor (2020–2026): Sylvie Corazzini
- Area^{1}: 6.99 km^{2} (2.70 sq mi)
- Highest elevation: 596 m (1,955 ft)
- Lowest elevation: 315 m (1,033 ft)
- Population (2023): 235
  - Density: 33.6/km^{2} (87.1/sq mi)
- Time zone: UTC+01:00 (CET)
  - Summer (DST): UTC+02:00 (CEST)
- INSEE/Postal code: 39269 /39360
- ^{1} French Land Register data, which excludes lakes, ponds, glaciers > 1 km^{2} (0.386 sq mi or 247 acres) and river estuaries.

Jeurre (French pronunciation: [ʒœʁ]) is a commune in the Jura department in Bourgogne-Franche-Comté in eastern France.

== Population ==
Historical population
Year	Pop.	±% p.a.
1968	142	—
1975	127	−1.58%
1982	153	+2.70%
1990	220	+4.64%
1999	253	+1.57%
2007	252	−0.05%
2012	256	+0.32%
2017	270	+1.07%
2023	235	−2.29%
Source: INSEE

== See also ==
- Communes of the Jura department
