= Bellecombe =

Commune in Bourgogne-Franche-Comté, France

- Commune
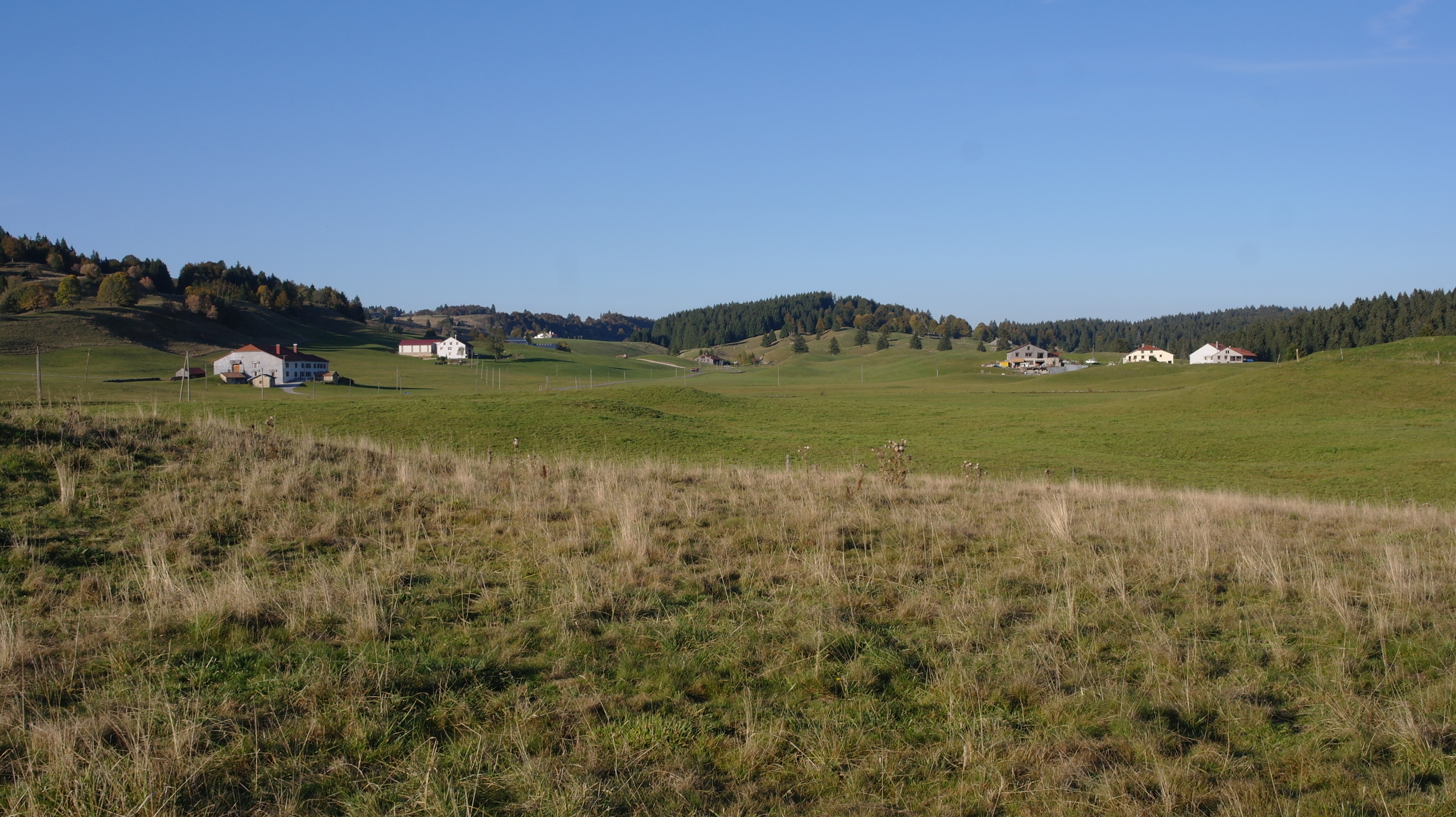
- A general view of Bellecombe
- Location of Bellecombe
- Location within France Location within Bourgogne-Franche-Comté
- Coordinates: 46°18′54″N 5°54′29″E
- Country: France
- Region: Bourgogne-Franche-Comté
- Department: Jura
- Arrondissement: Saint-Claude
- Canton: Coteaux du Lizon

Government
  - Mayor (2020–2026): Stéphane Gros
- Area^{1}: 12.17 km^{2} (4.70 sq mi)
- Highest elevation: 1,380 m (4,530 ft)
- Lowest elevation: 1,150 m (3,770 ft)
- Population (2023): 73
  - Density: 6.0/km^{2} (16/sq mi)
- Time zone: UTC+01:00 (CET)
  - Summer (DST): UTC+02:00 (CEST)
- INSEE/Postal code: 39046 /39310
- ^{1} French Land Register data, which excludes lakes, ponds, glaciers > 1 km^{2} (0.386 sq mi or 247 acres) and river estuaries.

Bellecombe (French pronunciation: [bɛlkɔ̃b]) is a commune in the Jura department in the region of Bourgogne-Franche-Comté in eastern France.

== Population ==
Historical population
Year	Pop.	±% p.a.
1968	113	—
1975	77	−5.33%
1982	75	−0.38%
1990	71	−0.68%
1999	92	+2.92%
2007	92	+0.00%
2012	77	−3.50%
2017	63	−3.93%
2023	73	+2.49%
Source: INSEE

== See also ==
- Communes of the Jura department
