= Crenans =

Commune in Bourgogne-Franche-Comté, France

- Commune
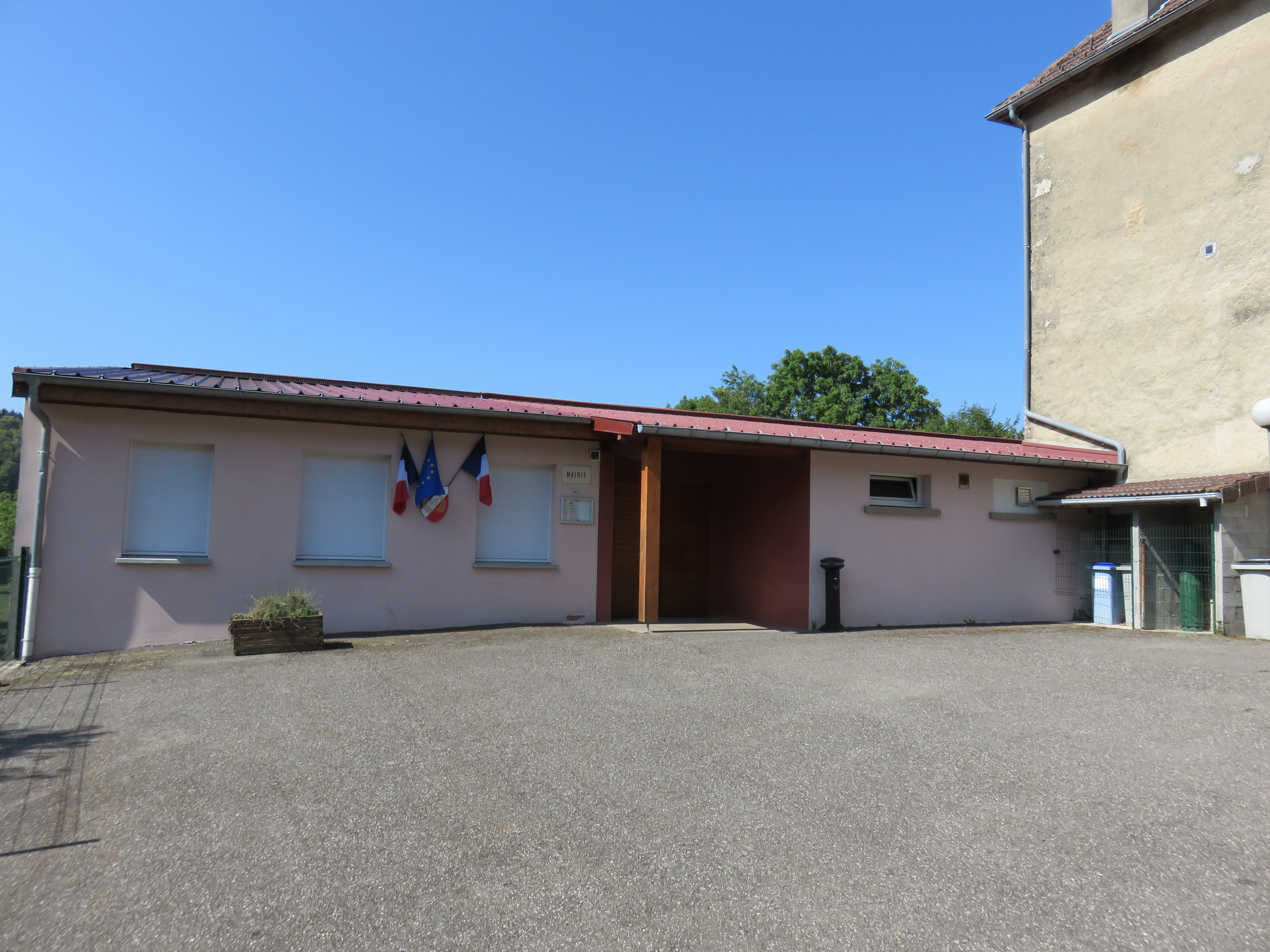
- The town hall in Crenans
- Location of Crenans
- Location within France Location within Bourgogne-Franche-Comté
- Coordinates: 46°27′30″N 5°44′08″E
- Country: France
- Region: Bourgogne-Franche-Comté
- Department: Jura
- Arrondissement: Saint-Claude
- Canton: Moirans-en-Montagne

Government
  - Mayor (2020–2026): Jean-Jacques Faguet
- Area^{1}: 8.82 km^{2} (3.41 sq mi)
- Highest elevation: 897 m (2,943 ft)
- Lowest elevation: 596 m (1,955 ft)
- Population (2023): 228
  - Density: 25.9/km^{2} (67.0/sq mi)
- Time zone: UTC+01:00 (CET)
  - Summer (DST): UTC+02:00 (CEST)
- INSEE/Postal code: 39179 /39260
- ^{1} French Land Register data, which excludes lakes, ponds, glaciers > 1 km^{2} (0.386 sq mi or 247 acres) and river estuaries.

Crenans (French pronunciation: [kʁənɑ̃]) is a commune in the Jura department in Bourgogne-Franche-Comté in eastern France.

== Population ==
Historical population
Year	Pop.	±% p.a.
1968	127	—
1975	123	−0.46%
1982	171	+4.82%
1990	201	+2.04%
1999	220	+1.01%
2007	246	+1.41%
2012	244	−0.16%
2017	239	−0.41%
2023	228	−0.78%
Source: INSEE

== See also ==
- Communes of the Jura department
