= Meussia =

Commune in Bourgogne-Franche-Comté, France

- Commune
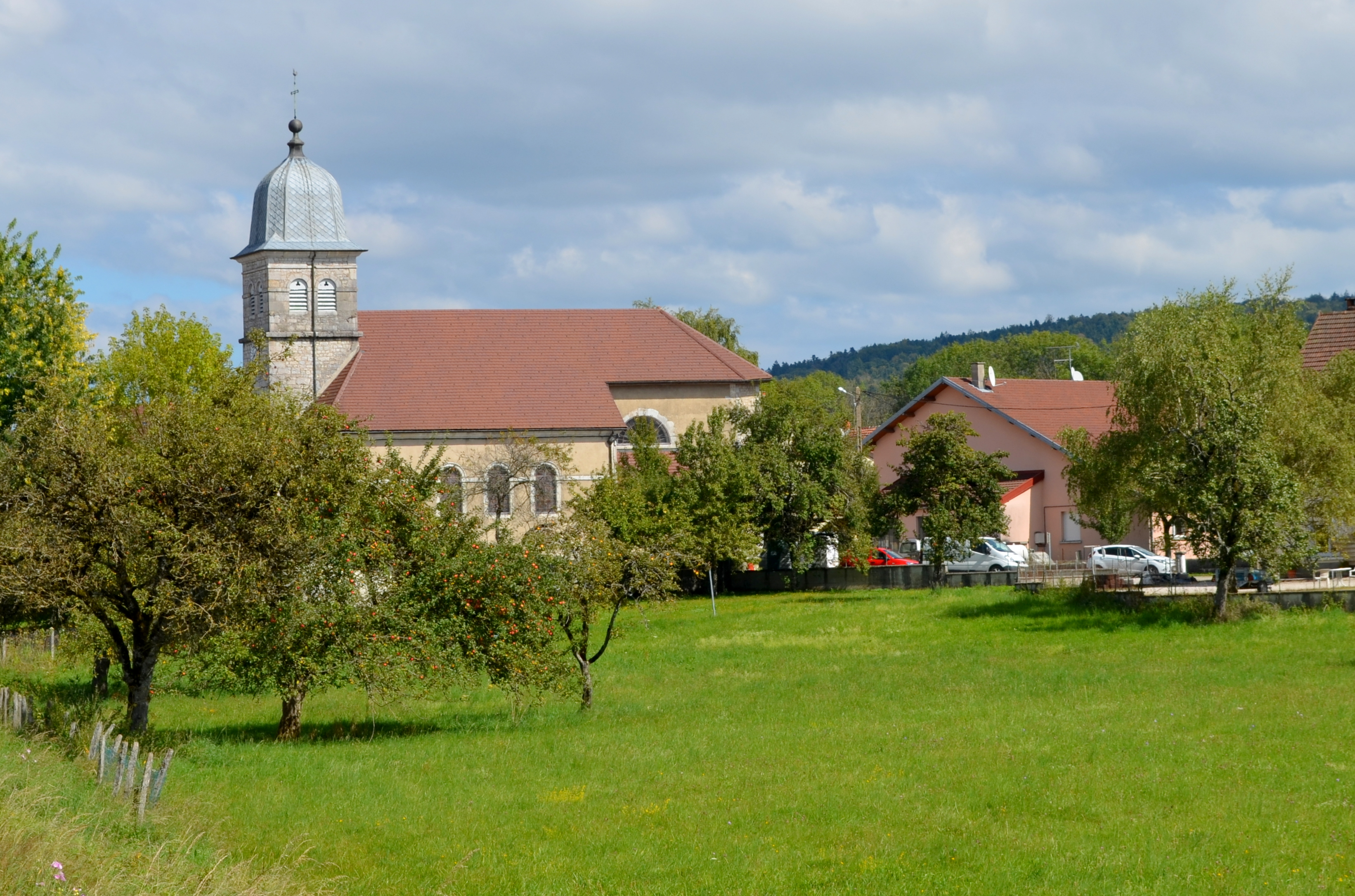
- The church in Meussia
- Location of Meussia
- Location within France Location within Bourgogne-Franche-Comté
- Coordinates: 46°29′56″N 5°43′32″E
- Country: France
- Region: Bourgogne-Franche-Comté
- Department: Jura
- Arrondissement: Saint-Claude
- Canton: Moirans-en-Montagne

Government
  - Mayor (2020–2026): Isabelle Tissot
- Area^{1}: 13.64 km^{2} (5.27 sq mi)
- Highest elevation: 875 m (2,871 ft)
- Lowest elevation: 439 m (1,440 ft)
- Population (2023): 438
  - Density: 32.1/km^{2} (83.2/sq mi)
- Time zone: UTC+01:00 (CET)
  - Summer (DST): UTC+02:00 (CEST)
- INSEE/Postal code: 39328 /39260
- ^{1} French Land Register data, which excludes lakes, ponds, glaciers > 1 km^{2} (0.386 sq mi or 247 acres) and river estuaries.

Meussia (French pronunciation: [møsja]) is a commune in the Jura department in Bourgogne-Franche-Comté in eastern France.

== Population ==
Historical population
Year	Pop.	±% p.a.
1968	302	—
1975	391	+3.76%
1982	417	+0.92%
1990	393	−0.74%
1999	382	−0.31%
2007	379	−0.10%
2012	453	+3.63%
2017	420	−1.50%
2023	438	+0.70%
Source: INSEE

== See also ==
- Communes of the Jura department
