= Coyron =

Commune in Bourgogne-Franche-Comté, France

- Commune
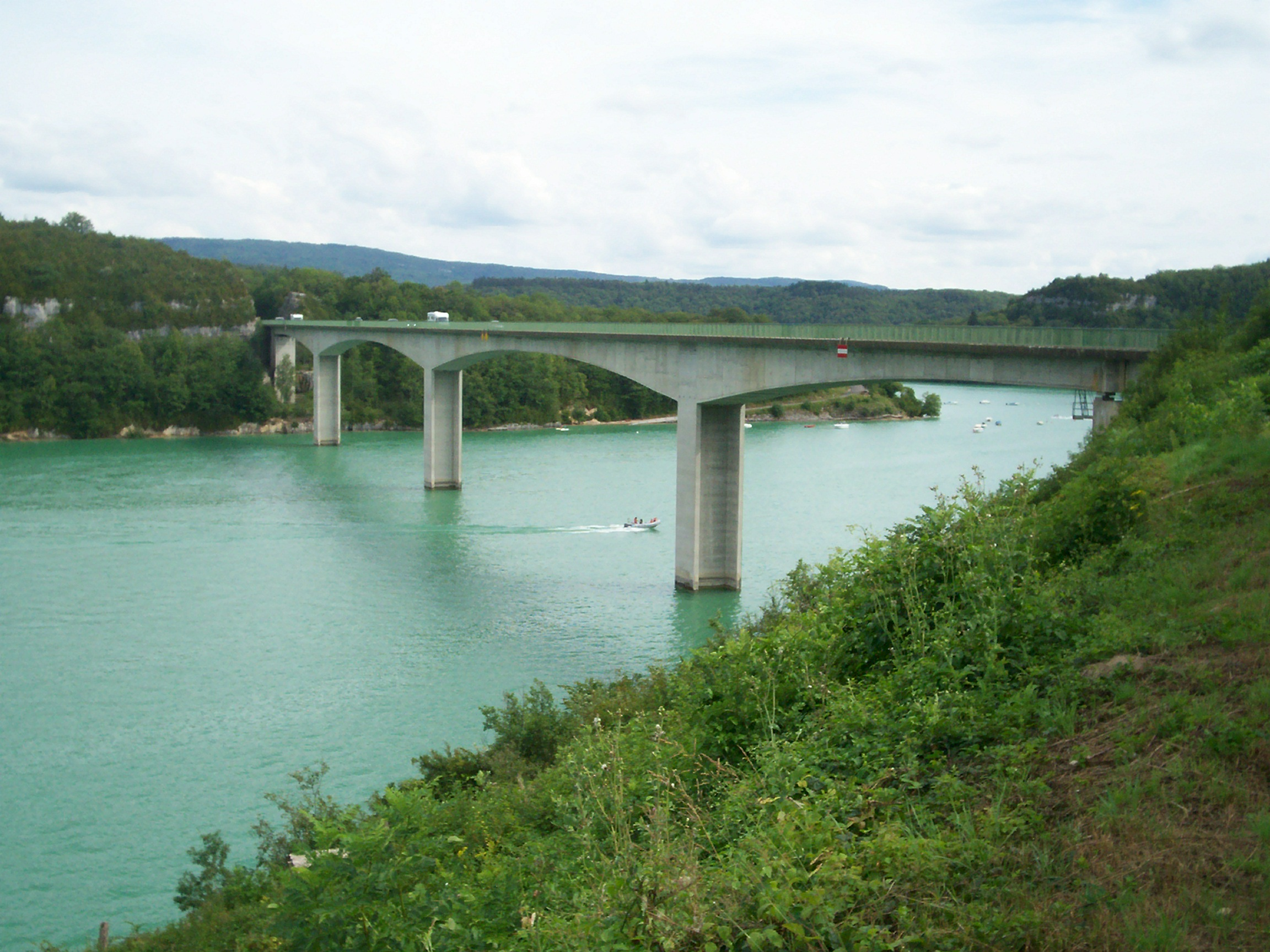
- The Pyle bridge in Coyron
- Location of Coyron
- Location within France Location within Bourgogne-Franche-Comté
- Coordinates: 46°30′42″N 5°42′21″E
- Country: France
- Region: Bourgogne-Franche-Comté
- Department: Jura
- Arrondissement: Saint-Claude
- Canton: Moirans-en-Montagne

Government
  - Mayor (2020–2026): Olivier Gambey
- Area^{1}: 5.53 km^{2} (2.14 sq mi)
- Highest elevation: 555 m (1,821 ft)
- Lowest elevation: 423 m (1,388 ft)
- Population (2023): 68
  - Density: 12/km^{2} (32/sq mi)
- Time zone: UTC+01:00 (CET)
  - Summer (DST): UTC+02:00 (CEST)
- INSEE/Postal code: 39175 /39260
- ^{1} French Land Register data, which excludes lakes, ponds, glaciers > 1 km^{2} (0.386 sq mi or 247 acres) and river estuaries.

Coyron (French pronunciation: [kwaʁɔ̃]) is a commune in the Jura department in Bourgogne-Franche-Comté in eastern France.

== Population ==
Historical population
Year	Pop.	±% p.a.
1968	17	—
1975	21	+3.06%
1982	45	+11.50%
1990	52	+1.82%
1999	58	+1.22%
2007	71	+2.56%
2012	73	+0.56%
2017	73	+0.00%
2023	68	−1.18%
Source: INSEE

== See also ==
- Communes of the Jura department
