= Les Moussières =

Commune in Bourgogne-Franche-Comté, France

- Commune
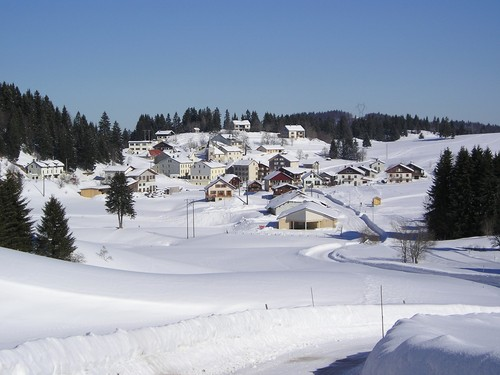
- A general view of Les Moussières
- Location of Les Moussières
- Location within France Location within Bourgogne-Franche-Comté
- Coordinates: 46°19′36″N 5°53′27″E
- Country: France
- Region: Bourgogne-Franche-Comté
- Department: Jura
- Arrondissement: Saint-Claude
- Canton: Coteaux du Lizon

Government
  - Mayor (2020–2026): Christian Rochet
- Area^{1}: 16.95 km^{2} (6.54 sq mi)
- Highest elevation: 1,310 m (4,300 ft)
- Lowest elevation: 880 m (2,890 ft)
- Population (2023): 174
  - Density: 10.3/km^{2} (26.6/sq mi)
- Time zone: UTC+01:00 (CET)
  - Summer (DST): UTC+02:00 (CEST)
- INSEE/Postal code: 39373 /39310
- ^{1} French Land Register data, which excludes lakes, ponds, glaciers > 1 km^{2} (0.386 sq mi or 247 acres) and river estuaries.

Les Moussières (French pronunciation: [le musjɛʁ]) is a commune in the Jura department in Bourgogne-Franche-Comté in eastern France.

== Population ==
Historical population
Year	Pop.	±% p.a.
1968	226	—
1975	208	−1.18%
1982	209	+0.07%
1990	206	−0.18%
1999	164	−2.50%
2007	189	+1.79%
2012	190	+0.11%
2017	167	−2.55%
2023	174	+0.69%
Source: INSEE

== See also ==
- Communes of the Jura department
