= Villard-Saint-Sauveur =

- Commune
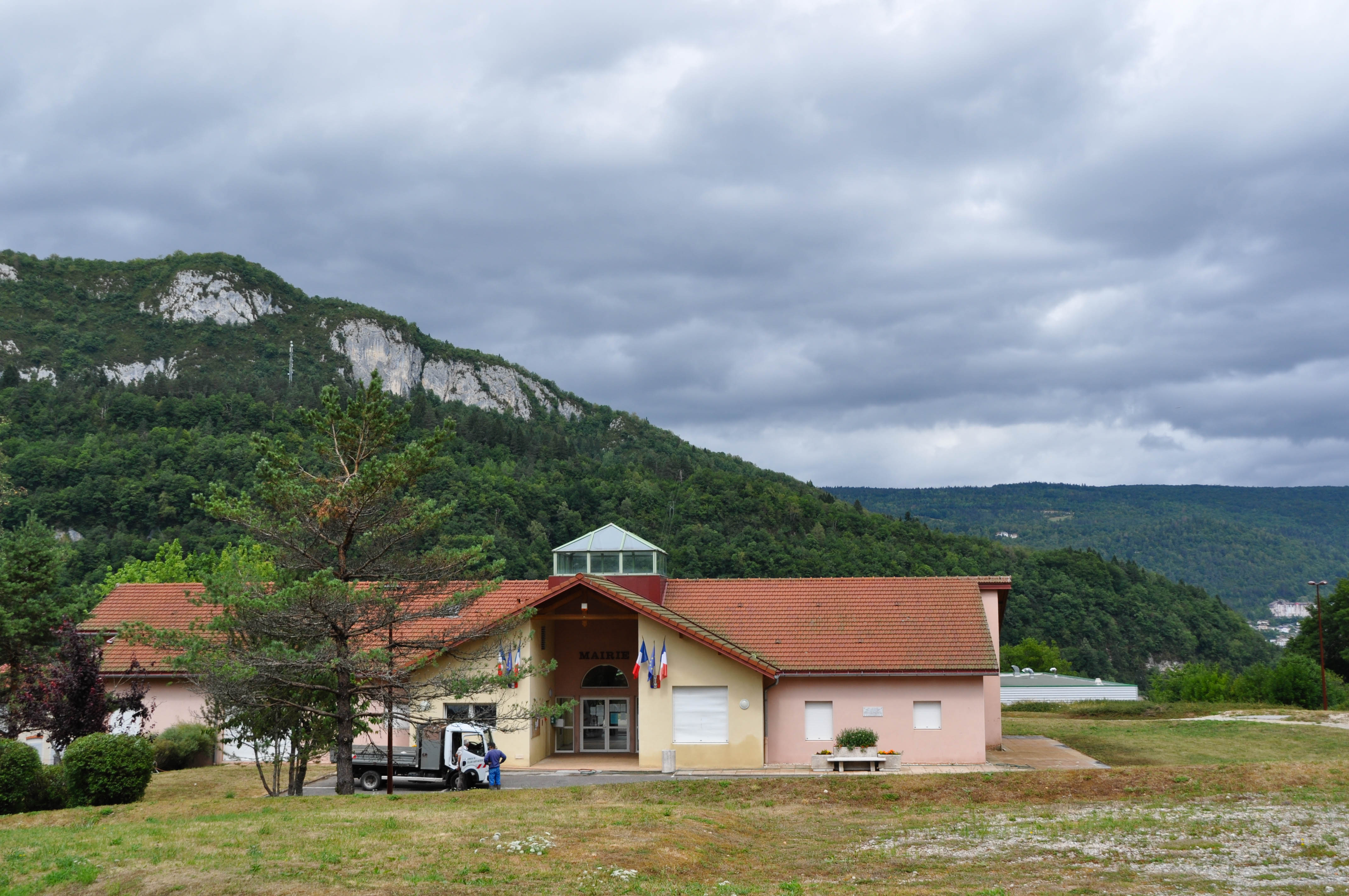
- Town hall

- Coat of arms
- Location of Villard-Saint-Sauveur
- Location within France Location within Bourgogne-Franche-Comté
- Coordinates: 46°22′21″N 5°52′31″E
- Country: France
- Region: Bourgogne-Franche-Comté
- Department: Jura
- Arrondissement: Saint-Claude
- Canton: Coteaux du Lizon

Government
  - Mayor (2024–2026): Daniel Monneret
- Area^{1}: 9.05 km^{2} (3.49 sq mi)
- Highest elevation: 1,089 m (3,573 ft)
- Lowest elevation: 410 m (1,350 ft)
- Population (2023): 585
  - Density: 64.6/km^{2} (167/sq mi)
- Time zone: UTC+01:00 (CET)
  - Summer (DST): UTC+02:00 (CEST)
- INSEE/Postal code: 39560 /39200
- ^{1} French Land Register data, which excludes lakes, ponds, glaciers > 1 km^{2} (0.386 sq mi or 247 acres) and river estuaries.

Villard-Saint-Sauveur (French pronunciation: [vilaʁ sɛ̃ sovœʁ]) is a commune in the Jura department in the Bourgogne-Franche-Comté region in eastern France.

== Population ==
Historical population
Year	Pop.	±% p.a.
1968	388	—
1975	423	+1.24%
1982	547	+3.74%
1990	588	+0.91%
1999	655	+1.21%
2007	647	−0.15%
2012	615	−1.01%
2017	618	+0.10%
2023	585	−0.91%
Source: INSEE

== See also ==
- Communes of the Jura department
