= Lajoux, France =

Commune in Bourgogne-Franche-Comté, France

Lajoux
- Commune
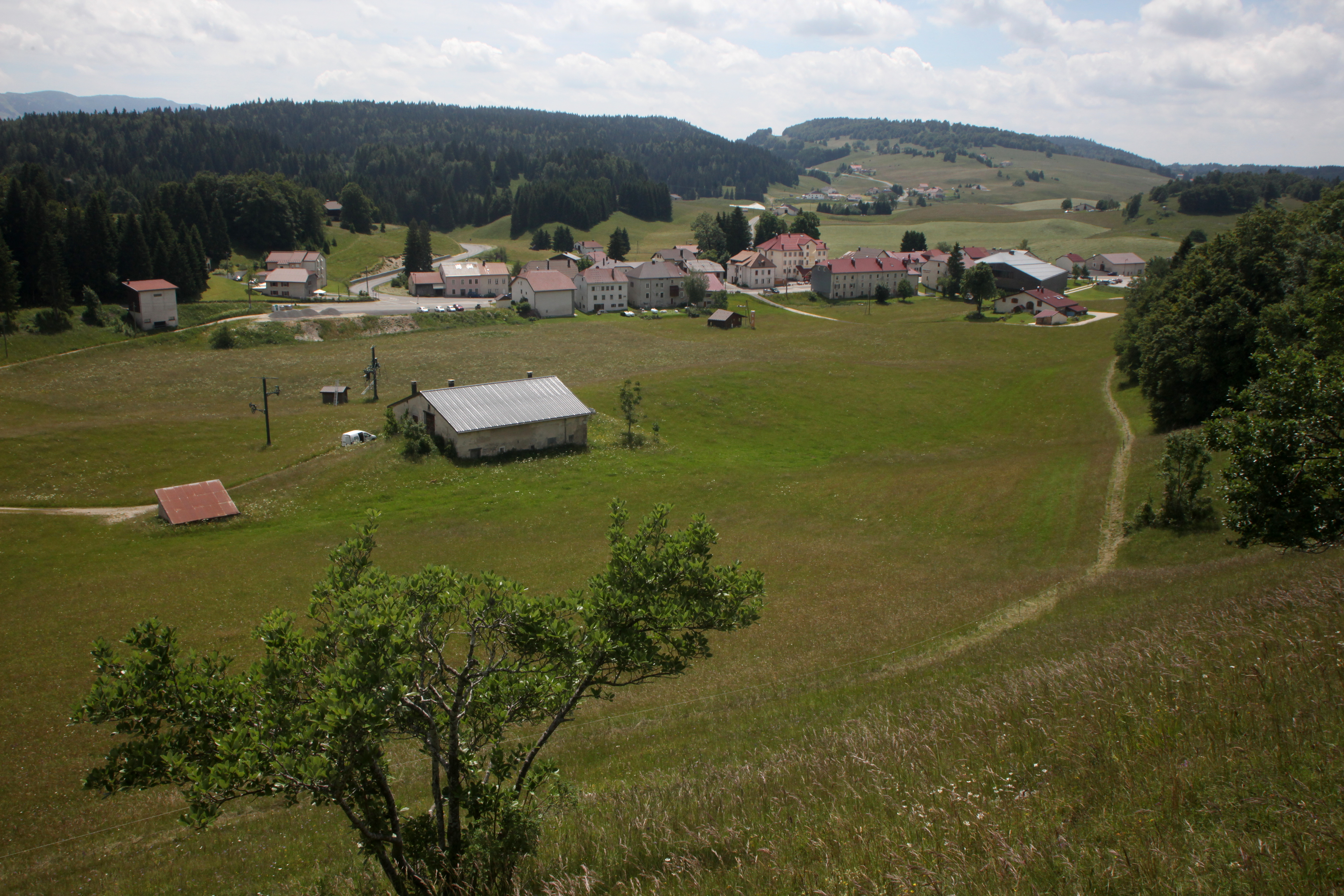
- Location of Lajoux
- Location within France Location within Bourgogne-Franche-Comté
- Coordinates: 46°22′33″N 5°58′20″E
- Country: France
- Region: Bourgogne-Franche-Comté
- Department: Jura
- Arrondissement: Saint-Claude
- Canton: Coteaux du Lizon

Government
  - Mayor (2020–2026): Hubert Maitre
- Area^{1}: 23.65 km^{2} (9.13 sq mi)
- Highest elevation: 1,495 m (4,905 ft)
- Lowest elevation: 936 m (3,071 ft)
- Population (2023): 287
  - Density: 12.1/km^{2} (31.4/sq mi)
- Time zone: UTC+01:00 (CET)
  - Summer (DST): UTC+02:00 (CEST)
- INSEE/Postal code: 39274 /1410
- ^{1} French Land Register data, which excludes lakes, ponds, glaciers > 1 km^{2} (0.386 sq mi or 247 acres) and river estuaries.

Lajoux (French pronunciation: [laʒu]) is a commune in the Jura department in Bourgogne-Franche-Comté in eastern France.

== Population ==
Historical population
Year	Pop.	±% p.a.
1968	149	—
1975	121	−2.93%
1982	158	+3.89%
1990	197	+2.80%
1999	220	+1.23%
2007	253	+1.76%
2012	253	+0.00%
2017	262	+0.70%
2023	287	+1.53%
Source: INSEE

== See also ==
- Communes of the Jura department
