= Condes =

Condes may refer to:

== Places ==
- Condes, Jura, a commune in the French region of Franche-Comté
- Condes, Haute-Marne, a commune in the French region of Champagne-Ardenne

== People with the surname ==
- Florante Condes (born 1980), Filipino boxer

== See also ==
- Las Condes, Chile
