= Lac de l'Assencière =

Lake in France

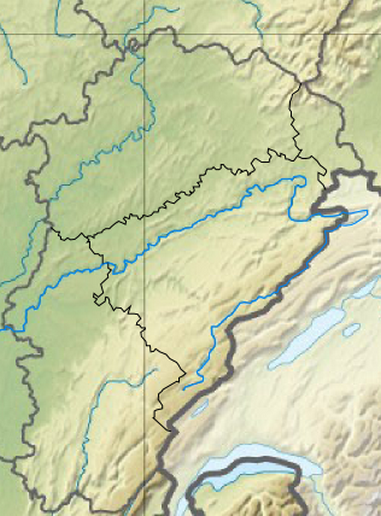
- Location within Franche-Comté
- Location: Jura department, Franche-Comté
- Coordinates: 46°30′24″N 5°46′25″E
- Basin countries: France

Lac de l'Assencière is a lake at Châtel-de-Joux in the Jura department of France. The lake is part of the preserve "Complexe des bois et du lac de l'Assencière".
