= Burgundy Middle Neolithic =

Middle Neolithic archaeological culture

- Alternative names: Néolithique moyen bourguignon
- Period: Neolithic
- Dates: 4000–3500 BC
- Major sites: Concise – Sous-Colachoz, Clairvaux-les-Lacs, Grotte du Gardon

The Burgundy Middle Neolithic (BMN; French: Néolithique moyen bourguignon, NMB) is an archaeological culture of the Neolithic period, dated between 4000 and 3500 BC, centered on eastern France in the Bourgogne-Franche-Comté region. In what is now Switzerland, vessels in the BMN style have been found in assemblages — varying by region — associated with the Chasséen culture (4300–3500 BC), the Cortaillod culture (4200–3500 BC), and the Pfyn culture (3900–3500 BC).

== Definition and research history ==
The BMN culture was defined in 1983 at a colloquium held at Beffia, France, based on ceramics from a broad geographical area. However, chronological developments and assumed regional differences were difficult to discern at that time, owing to poorly dated finds, mainly from caves and dry-land sites that had been used over long periods. Subsequent excavations — notably those at the multi-occupation lakeshore settlements of Clairvaux-les-Lacs (Franche-Comté) and at the habitation layers of the Grotte du Gardon at Ambérieu-en-Bugey (Auvergne-Rhône-Alpes) — together with the analysis of both older and more recent finds, enabled a refined chronology to be established during the 2010s. The distribution area of the BMN was also better delimited, extending roughly from Lyon in the south to Belfort in the north, and from the Jura arc in the east to Autun in the west.

== Ceramics and typology ==
At Lake Neuchâtel, three precisely dendrochronologically dated lakeshore stations (E2–E5) at Concise – Sous-Colachoz yielded, alongside ceramics in the Cortaillod style, a large quantity — approximately 50% — of sherds in the BMN style, dated between 3713 and 3516 BC. Typical forms include globular bottles with handles; bottles with an elongated lower body and handles arranged in a crown around the belly; and jars with a splayed or funnel-shaped rim and a pronounced shoulder (carination), often bearing isolated or paired knobs. Also characteristic are various types of bowls and dishes (some with a carinated profile) as well as plats à pain ("bread plates"), often featuring rows of perforations along the rim. Over time, the rims of bottles and jars became progressively more rectilinear or even inward-slanting, and profiles more angular.

Around 3800/3750 BC, a shift from rounded and flattened bases to almost exclusively flat bases is significant; observable at least in specimens from the eastern part of the distribution zone (BMN of Jurassian style), this may mark a regional difference from ceramics in the Burgundian BMN style. Beyond the assemblages at Concise – Sous-Colachoz, BMN-style ceramics are attested in smaller quantities at other settlements in the Three Lakes region, suggesting mobility and contacts between this region and eastern France.

== Bibliography ==
- Pétrequin, Pierre; Gallay, Alain (eds.): Le Néolithique moyen bourguignon (N.M.B.). Actes du colloque de Beffia (Jura, France) 4 et 5 juin 1983, 1986.
- Burri, Elena: La céramique du Néolithique moyen. Analyse spatiale et histoire des peuplements, 2007 (Cahiers d'archéologie romande, 109).
- Moreau, Clément: La céramique du Néolithique moyen II de l'Yonne à la Saône, entre 4300 et 3400 avant notre ère, 2 vols., doctoral thesis, Université de Bourgogne, 2010.
- Rey, Pierre-Jérôme: "Entre Saint-Uze, Chasséen et NMB dans le Bugey: évolutions techniques et culturelles de la céramique des couches 47 à 38", in: Perrin, Thomas; Voruz, Jean-Louis (eds.): La Grotte du Gardon (Ain), vol. 2, 2013, pp. 85–164.
- Pétrequin, Pierre; Pétrequin, Anne-Marie (eds.): Clairvaux et le «Néolithique Moyen Bourguignon», 2 vols., 2015.
- Stapfer, Regine; Kissling, Jonas et al.: Die Ufersiedlungen von Sutz-Lattrigen 3830 bis 3560 v.Chr. und ihre Kontaktnetze, 2 vols., 2023.
