= Onoz =

Onoz may refer to:

- Onoz, Namur, a section of Jemeppe-sur-Sambre, province of Namur, Belgium
- Onoz, Jura, a commune in the French region of Franche-Comté
