= Courbette =

Courbette may refer to:

- One of the airs above the ground, or school jumps, in classical dressage
- Courbette, Jura, a place in France
