= Genod =

Commune in Bourgogne-Franche-Comté, France

- Commune
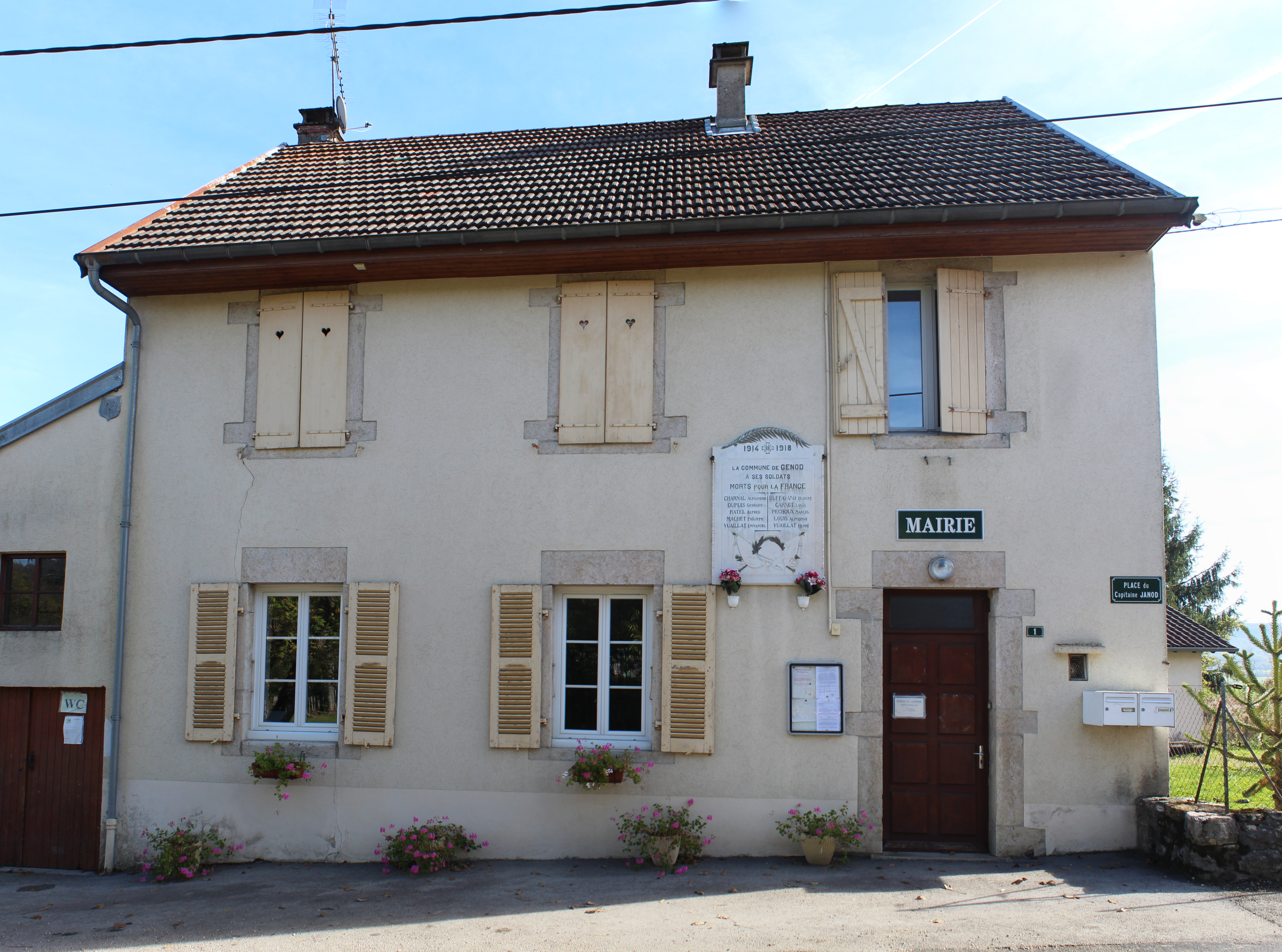
- The town hall in Genod
- Location of Genod
- Location within France Location within Bourgogne-Franche-Comté
- Coordinates: 46°21′17″N 5°31′57″E
- Country: France
- Region: Bourgogne-Franche-Comté
- Department: Jura
- Arrondissement: Lons-le-Saunier
- Canton: Moirans-en-Montagne

Government
  - Mayor (2023–2026): Jacques Douvre
- Area^{1}: 3.14 km^{2} (1.21 sq mi)
- Highest elevation: 689 m (2,260 ft)
- Lowest elevation: 326 m (1,070 ft)
- Population (2023): 73
  - Density: 23/km^{2} (60/sq mi)
- Time zone: UTC+01:00 (CET)
  - Summer (DST): UTC+02:00 (CEST)
- INSEE/Postal code: 39247 /39240
- ^{1} French Land Register data, which excludes lakes, ponds, glaciers > 1 km^{2} (0.386 sq mi or 247 acres) and river estuaries.

Genod (French pronunciation: [ʒəno]) is a commune in the Jura department in Bourgogne-Franche-Comté in eastern France.

== Population ==
Historical population
Year	Pop.	±% p.a.
1968	61	—
1975	51	−2.53%
1982	46	−1.46%
1990	52	+1.54%
1999	60	+1.60%
2007	66	+1.20%
2012	66	+0.00%
2017	68	+0.60%
2023	73	+1.19%
Source: INSEE

== See also ==
- Communes of the Jura department
