= Nancuise =

Commune in Bourgogne-Franche-Comté, France

- Commune
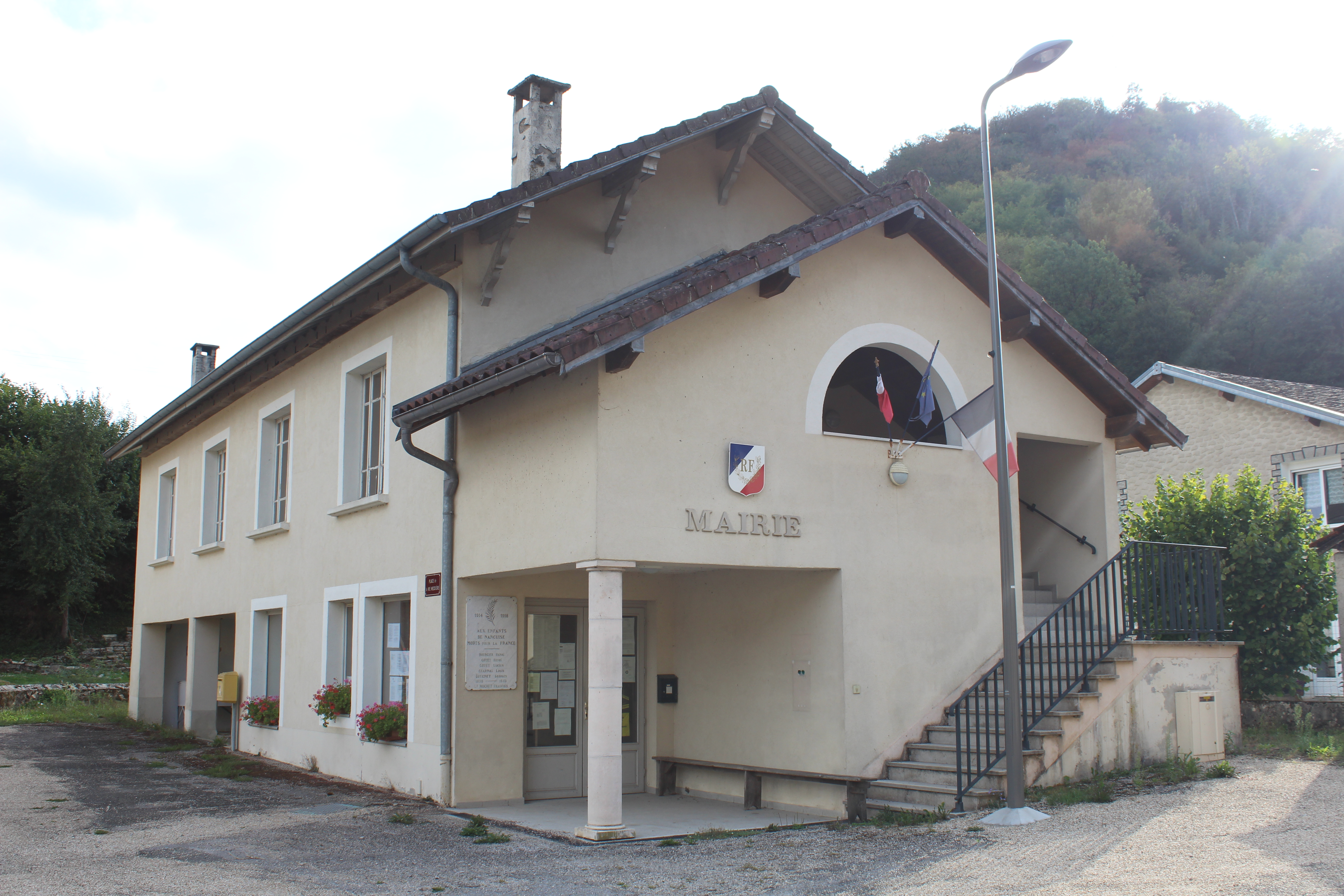
- The town hall in Nancuise

- Coat of arms
- Location of Nancuise
- Location within France Location within Bourgogne-Franche-Comté
- Coordinates: 46°28′04″N 5°32′09″E
- Country: France
- Region: Bourgogne-Franche-Comté
- Department: Jura
- Arrondissement: Lons-le-Saunier
- Canton: Moirans-en-Montagne

Government
  - Mayor (2022–2026): Bertrand Halbourg
- Area^{1}: 5.21 km^{2} (2.01 sq mi)
- Highest elevation: 584 m (1,916 ft)
- Lowest elevation: 364 m (1,194 ft)
- Population (2023): 40
  - Density: 7.7/km^{2} (20/sq mi)
- Time zone: UTC+01:00 (CET)
  - Summer (DST): UTC+02:00 (CEST)
- INSEE/Postal code: 39380 /39270
- ^{1} French Land Register data, which excludes lakes, ponds, glaciers > 1 km^{2} (0.386 sq mi or 247 acres) and river estuaries.

Nancuise (French pronunciation: [nɑ̃kɥiz]) is a commune in the Jura department in Bourgogne-Franche-Comté in eastern France.

== Population ==
Historical population
Year	Pop.	±% p.a.
1968	56	—
1975	77	+4.65%
1982	57	−4.21%
1990	58	+0.22%
1999	47	−2.31%
2007	46	−0.27%
2012	39	−3.25%
2017	46	+3.36%
2023	40	−2.30%
Source: INSEE

== See also ==
- Communes of the Jura department
