= Mérona =

Commune in Bourgogne-Franche-Comté, France

- Commune
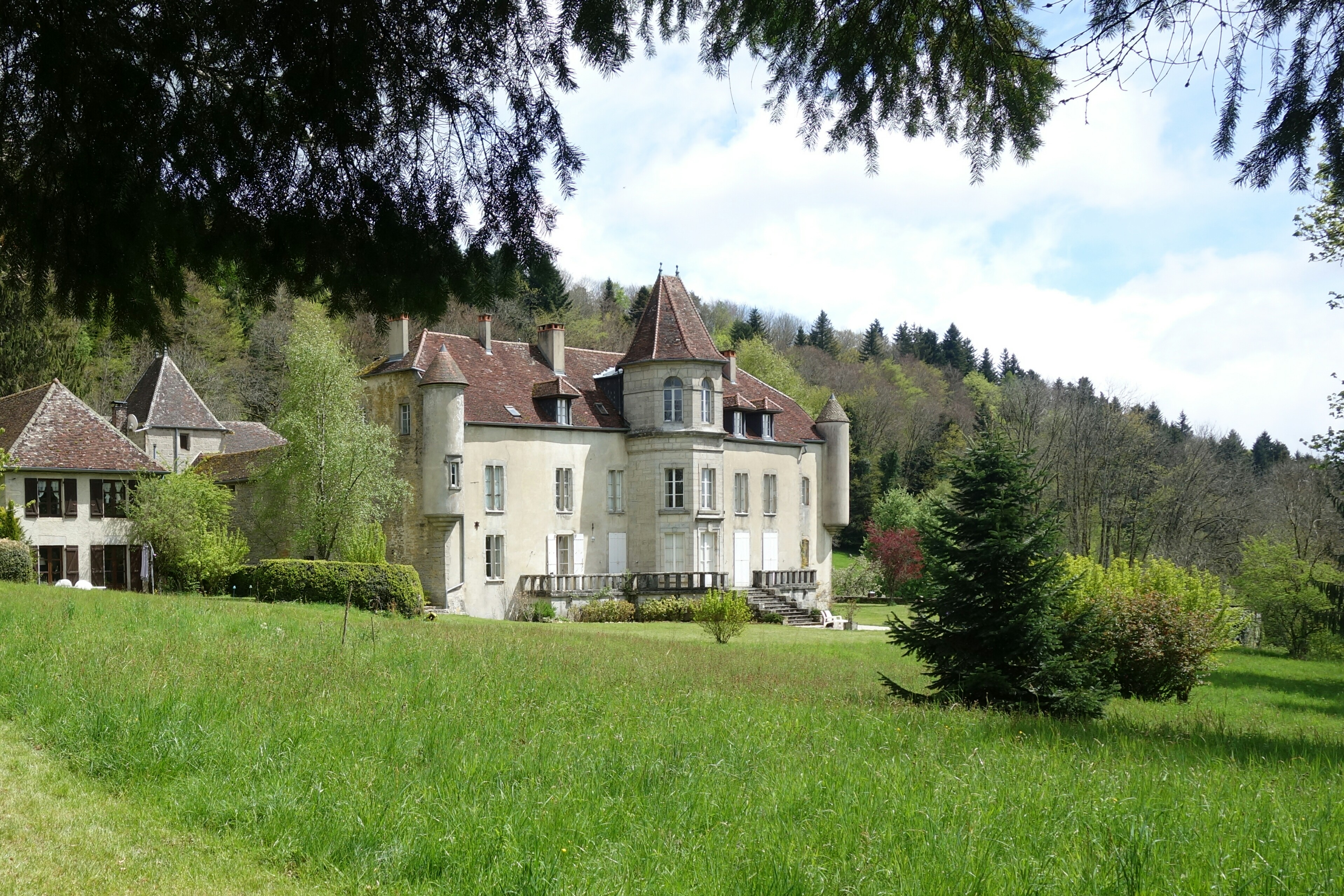
- The chateau in Mérona
- Location of Mérona
- Location within France Location within Bourgogne-Franche-Comté
- Coordinates: 46°33′22″N 5°38′10″E
- Country: France
- Region: Bourgogne-Franche-Comté
- Department: Jura
- Arrondissement: Lons-le-Saunier
- Canton: Moirans-en-Montagne
- Intercommunality: Terre d'Émeraude Communauté

Government
  - Mayor (2020–2026): Bernard de Mérona
- Area^{1}: 2.97 km^{2} (1.15 sq mi)
- Elevation: 642 m (2,106 ft)
- Highest elevation: 702 m (2,303 ft)
- Lowest elevation: 548 m (1,798 ft)
- Population (2023): 9
  - Density: 3.0/km^{2} (7.8/sq mi)
- Time zone: UTC+01:00 (CET)
  - Summer (DST): UTC+02:00 (CEST)
- INSEE/Postal code: 39324 /39270
- ^{1} French Land Register data, which excludes lakes, ponds, glaciers > 1 km^{2} (0.386 sq mi or 247 acres) and river estuaries.

Mérona (French pronunciation: [meʁɔna]) is a commune in the Jura department in Bourgogne-Franche-Comté in eastern France.

== Population ==
Historical population
Year	Pop.	±% p.a.
1968	10	—
1975	7	−4.97%
1982	5	−4.69%
1990	3	−6.19%
1999	8	+11.51%
2007	11	+4.06%
2012	11	+0.00%
2017	8	−6.17%
2023	9	+1.98%
Source: INSEE

== See also ==
- Communes of the Jura department
