= Alièze =

Commune in Bourgogne-Franche-Comté, France

- Commune
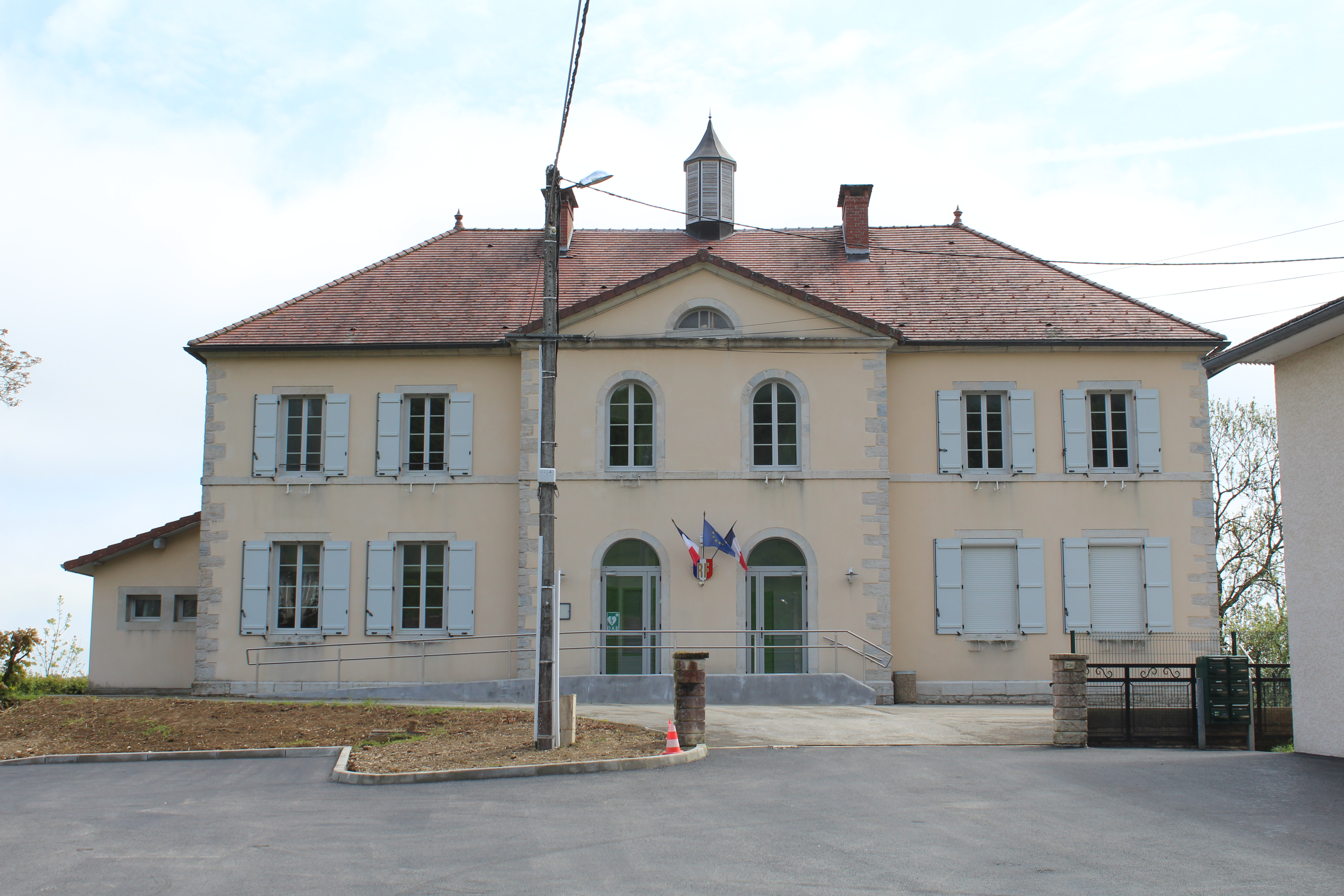
- The town hall in Alièze
- Location of Alièze
- Location within France Location within Bourgogne-Franche-Comté
- Coordinates: 46°35′19″N 5°34′39″E
- Country: France
- Region: Bourgogne-Franche-Comté
- Department: Jura
- Arrondissement: Lons-le-Saunier
- Canton: Moirans-en-Montagne
- Intercommunality: Terre d'Émeraude Communauté

Government
  - Mayor (2020–2026): Josette Bourgeois
- Area^{1}: 5.86 km^{2} (2.26 sq mi)
- Highest elevation: 686 m (2,251 ft)
- Lowest elevation: 538 m (1,765 ft)
- Population (2023): 149
  - Density: 25.4/km^{2} (65.9/sq mi)
- Time zone: UTC+01:00 (CET)
  - Summer (DST): UTC+02:00 (CEST)
- INSEE/Postal code: 39007 /39270
- ^{1} French Land Register data, which excludes lakes, ponds, glaciers > 1 km^{2} (0.386 sq mi or 247 acres) and river estuaries.

Alièze (French pronunciation: [aljɛz]) is a commune in the Jura department in the region of Bourgogne-Franche-Comté in eastern France.

== Population ==
Historical population
Year	Pop.	±% p.a.
1968	115	—
1975	95	−2.69%
1982	121	+3.52%
1990	131	+1.00%
1999	144	+1.06%
2007	152	+0.68%
2012	154	+0.26%
2017	153	−0.13%
2023	149	−0.44%
Source: INSEE

== See also ==
- Communes of the Jura department
