= La Boissière, Jura =

Commune in Bourgogne-Franche-Comté, France

La Boissière
- Commune
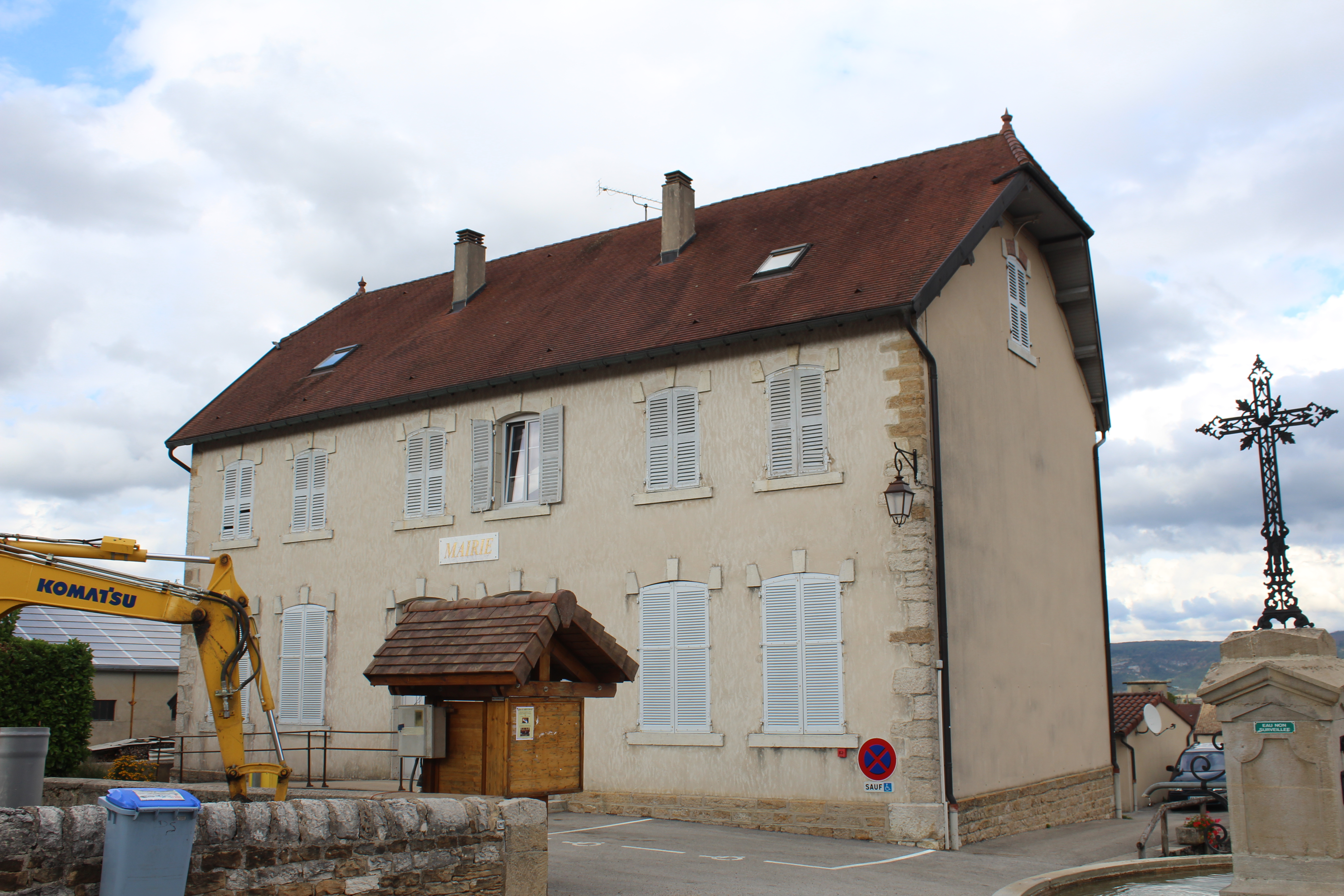
- The town hall in La Boissière
- Location of La Boissière
- Location within France Location within Bourgogne-Franche-Comté
- Coordinates: 46°25′24″N 5°31′54″E
- Country: France
- Region: Bourgogne-Franche-Comté
- Department: Jura
- Arrondissement: Lons-le-Saunier
- Canton: Moirans-en-Montagne

Government
  - Mayor (2020–2026): Dominique Lavry
- Area^{1}: 5.36 km^{2} (2.07 sq mi)
- Highest elevation: 629 m (2,064 ft)
- Lowest elevation: 370 m (1,210 ft)
- Population (2023): 57
  - Density: 11/km^{2} (28/sq mi)
- Time zone: UTC+01:00 (CET)
  - Summer (DST): UTC+02:00 (CEST)
- INSEE/Postal code: 39062 /39240
- ^{1} French Land Register data, which excludes lakes, ponds, glaciers > 1 km^{2} (0.386 sq mi or 247 acres) and river estuaries.

La Boissière (French pronunciation: [la bwasjɛʁ]) is a commune in the Jura department in Bourgogne-Franche-Comté in eastern France.

== Population ==
Historical population
Year	Pop.	±% p.a.
1968	74	—
1975	52	−4.92%
1982	49	−0.85%
1990	44	−1.34%
1999	52	+1.87%
2007	64	+2.63%
2012	66	+0.62%
2017	68	+0.60%
2023	57	−2.90%
Source: INSEE

== See also ==
- Communes of the Jura department
