= Écrille =

Commune in Bourgogne-Franche-Comté, France

- Commune
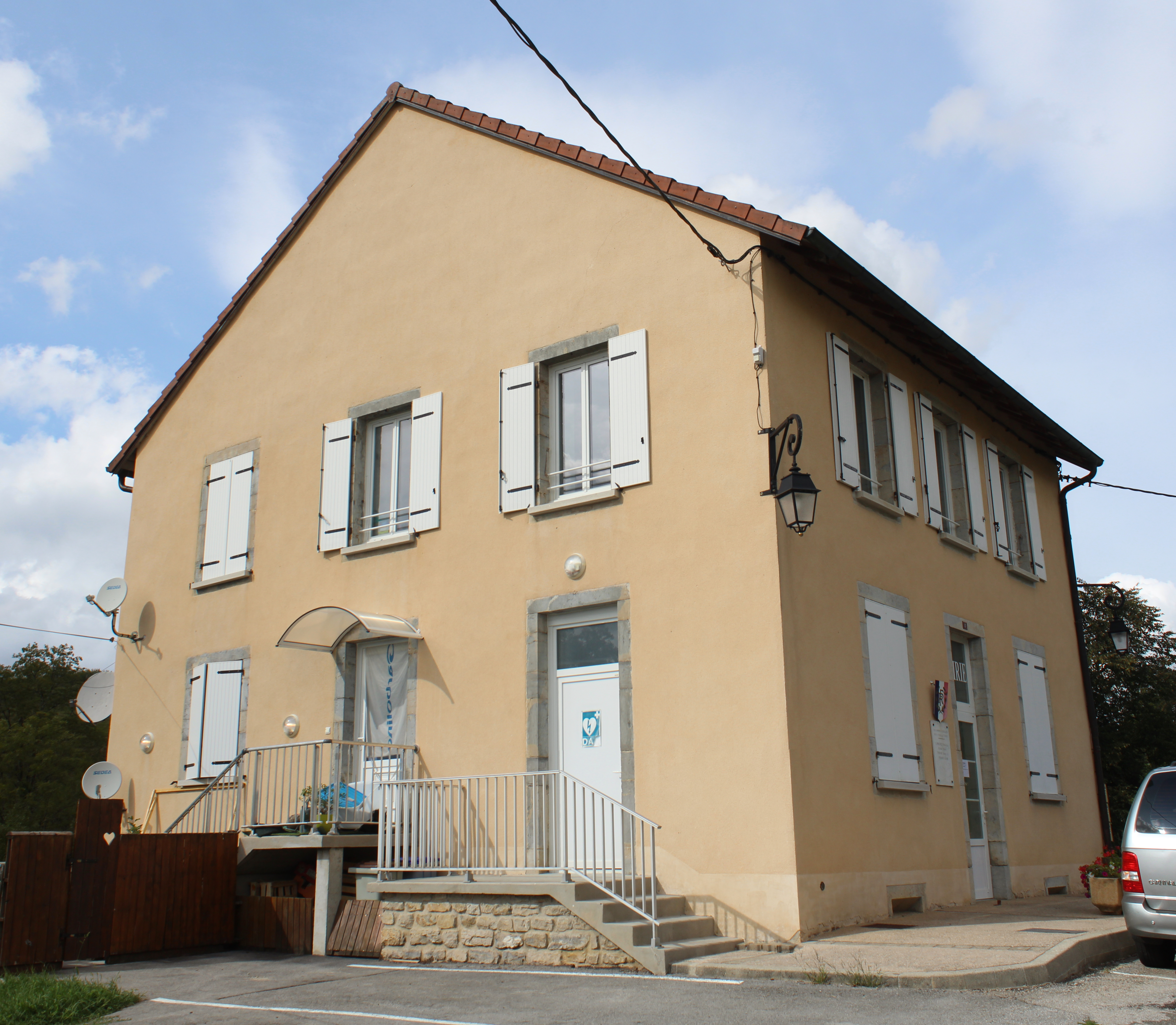
- The town hall in Écrille
- Location of Écrille
- Location within France Location within Bourgogne-Franche-Comté
- Coordinates: 46°30′24″N 5°37′55″E
- Country: France
- Region: Bourgogne-Franche-Comté
- Department: Jura
- Arrondissement: Lons-le-Saunier
- Canton: Moirans-en-Montagne

Government
  - Mayor (2020–2026): Franck Girod
- Area^{1}: 5.25 km^{2} (2.03 sq mi)
- Highest elevation: 603 m (1,978 ft)
- Lowest elevation: 389 m (1,276 ft)
- Population (2023): 89
  - Density: 17/km^{2} (44/sq mi)
- Time zone: UTC+01:00 (CET)
  - Summer (DST): UTC+02:00 (CEST)
- INSEE/Postal code: 39207 /39270
- ^{1} French Land Register data, which excludes lakes, ponds, glaciers > 1 km^{2} (0.386 sq mi or 247 acres) and river estuaries.

Écrille (French pronunciation: [ekʁij]) is a commune in the Jura department in Bourgogne-Franche-Comté in eastern France.

== Population ==
Historical population
Year	Pop.	±% p.a.
1968	75	—
1975	68	−1.39%
1982	56	−2.74%
1990	75	+3.72%
1999	68	−1.08%
2007	69	+0.18%
2012	89	+5.22%
2017	83	−1.39%
2023	89	+1.17%
Source: INSEE

== See also ==
- Communes of the Jura department
