= Moutonne =

Commune in Bourgogne-Franche-Comté, France

- Commune
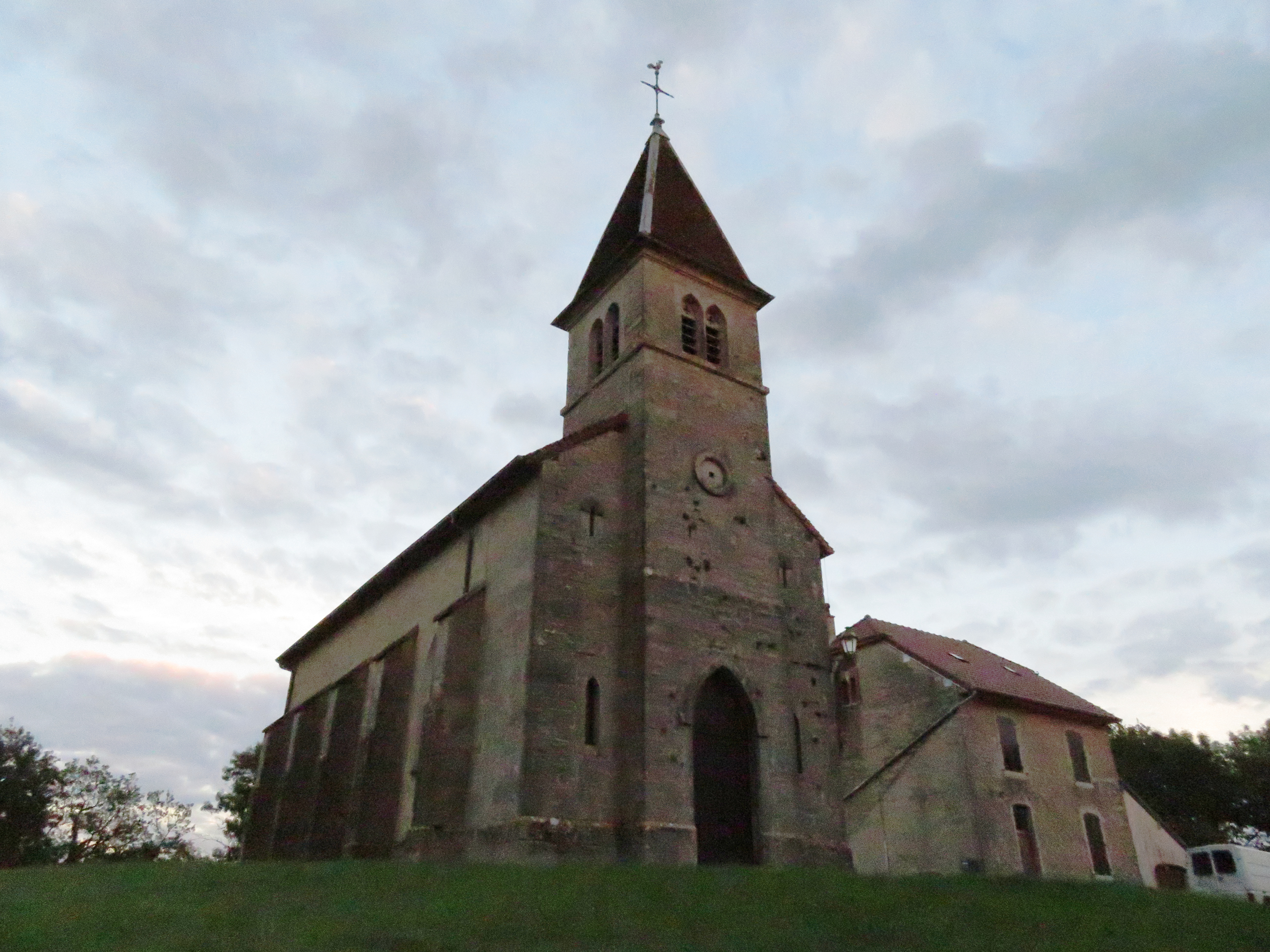
- The church in Moutonne
- Location of Moutonne
- Location within France Location within Bourgogne-Franche-Comté
- Coordinates: 46°31′45″N 5°33′38″E
- Country: France
- Region: Bourgogne-Franche-Comté
- Department: Jura
- Arrondissement: Lons-le-Saunier
- Canton: Moirans-en-Montagne

Government
  - Mayor (2020–2026): Robert Paris
- Area^{1}: 3.99 km^{2} (1.54 sq mi)
- Highest elevation: 578 m (1,896 ft)
- Lowest elevation: 470 m (1,540 ft)
- Population (2023): 129
  - Density: 32.3/km^{2} (83.7/sq mi)
- Time zone: UTC+01:00 (CET)
  - Summer (DST): UTC+02:00 (CEST)
- INSEE/Postal code: 39375 /39270
- ^{1} French Land Register data, which excludes lakes, ponds, glaciers > 1 km^{2} (0.386 sq mi or 247 acres) and river estuaries.

Moutonne (French pronunciation: [mutɔn]) is a commune in the Jura department in Bourgogne-Franche-Comté in eastern France.

== Population ==
Historical population
Year	Pop.	±% p.a.
1968	57	—
1975	61	+0.97%
1982	84	+4.68%
1990	93	+1.28%
1999	81	−1.52%
2007	110	+3.90%
2012	121	+1.92%
2017	132	+1.76%
2023	129	−0.38%
Source: INSEE

== See also ==
- Communes of the Jura department
