= Reithouse =

Commune in Bourgogne-Franche-Comté, France

- Commune
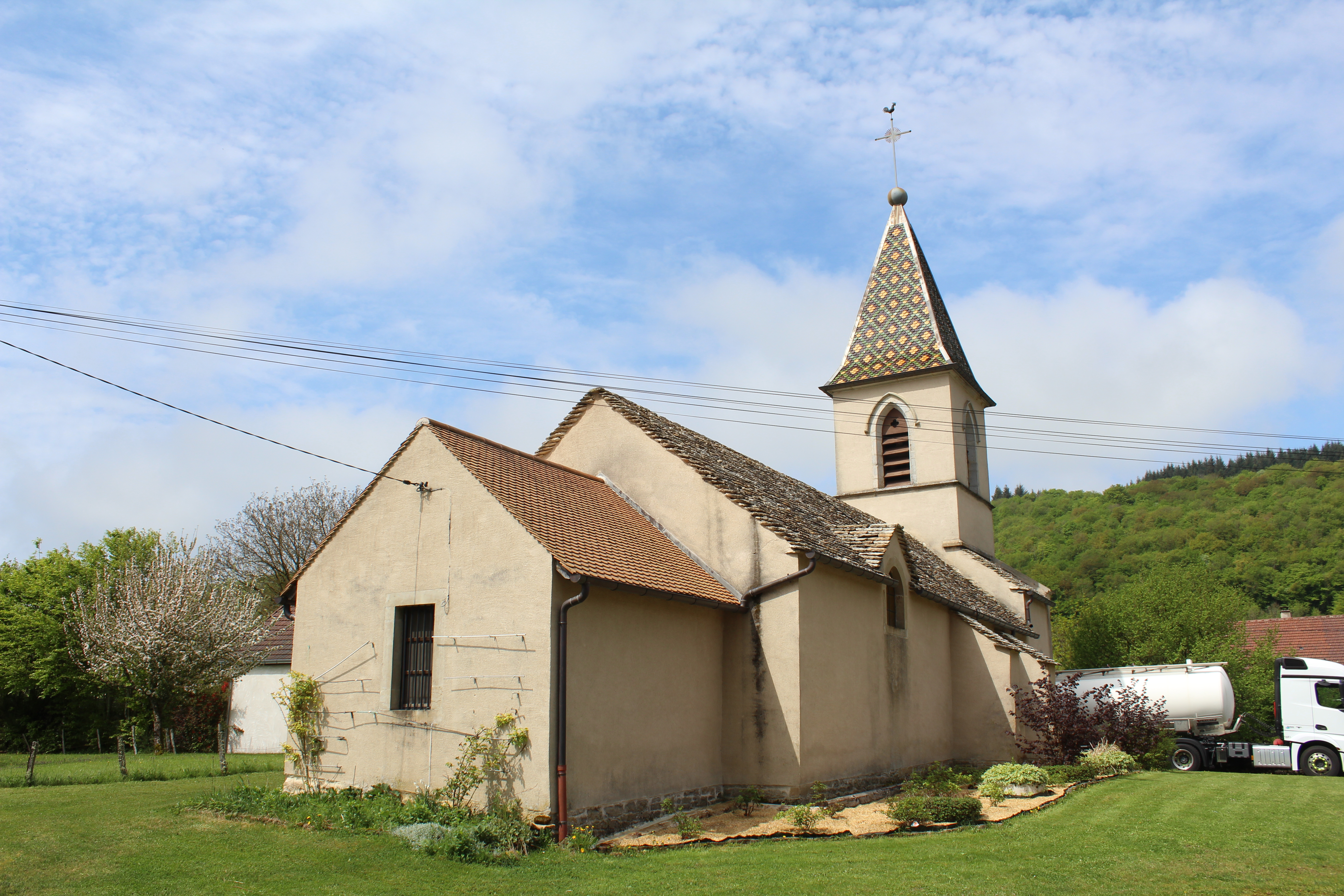
- The church in Reithouse
- Location of Reithouse
- Location within France Location within Bourgogne-Franche-Comté
- Coordinates: 46°33′37″N 5°33′27″E
- Country: France
- Region: Bourgogne-Franche-Comté
- Department: Jura
- Arrondissement: Lons-le-Saunier
- Canton: Moirans-en-Montagne

Government
  - Mayor (2020–2026): Rémi Thomas
- Area^{1}: 4.84 km^{2} (1.87 sq mi)
- Highest elevation: 672 m (2,205 ft)
- Lowest elevation: 489 m (1,604 ft)
- Population (2023): 55
  - Density: 11/km^{2} (29/sq mi)
- Time zone: UTC+01:00 (CET)
  - Summer (DST): UTC+02:00 (CEST)
- INSEE/Postal code: 39455 /39270
- ^{1} French Land Register data, which excludes lakes, ponds, glaciers > 1 km^{2} (0.386 sq mi or 247 acres) and river estuaries.

Reithouse (French pronunciation: [ʁɛtuz]) is a commune in the Jura department in the region of Bourgogne-Franche-Comté in eastern France.

== Population ==
Historical population
Year	Pop.	±% p.a.
1968	47	—
1975	33	−4.93%
1982	35	+0.84%
1990	56	+6.05%
1999	52	−0.82%
2007	52	+0.00%
2012	58	+2.21%
2017	59	+0.34%
2023	55	−1.16%
Source: INSEE

== See also ==
- Communes of the Jura department
