= La Tour-du-Meix =

- Commune
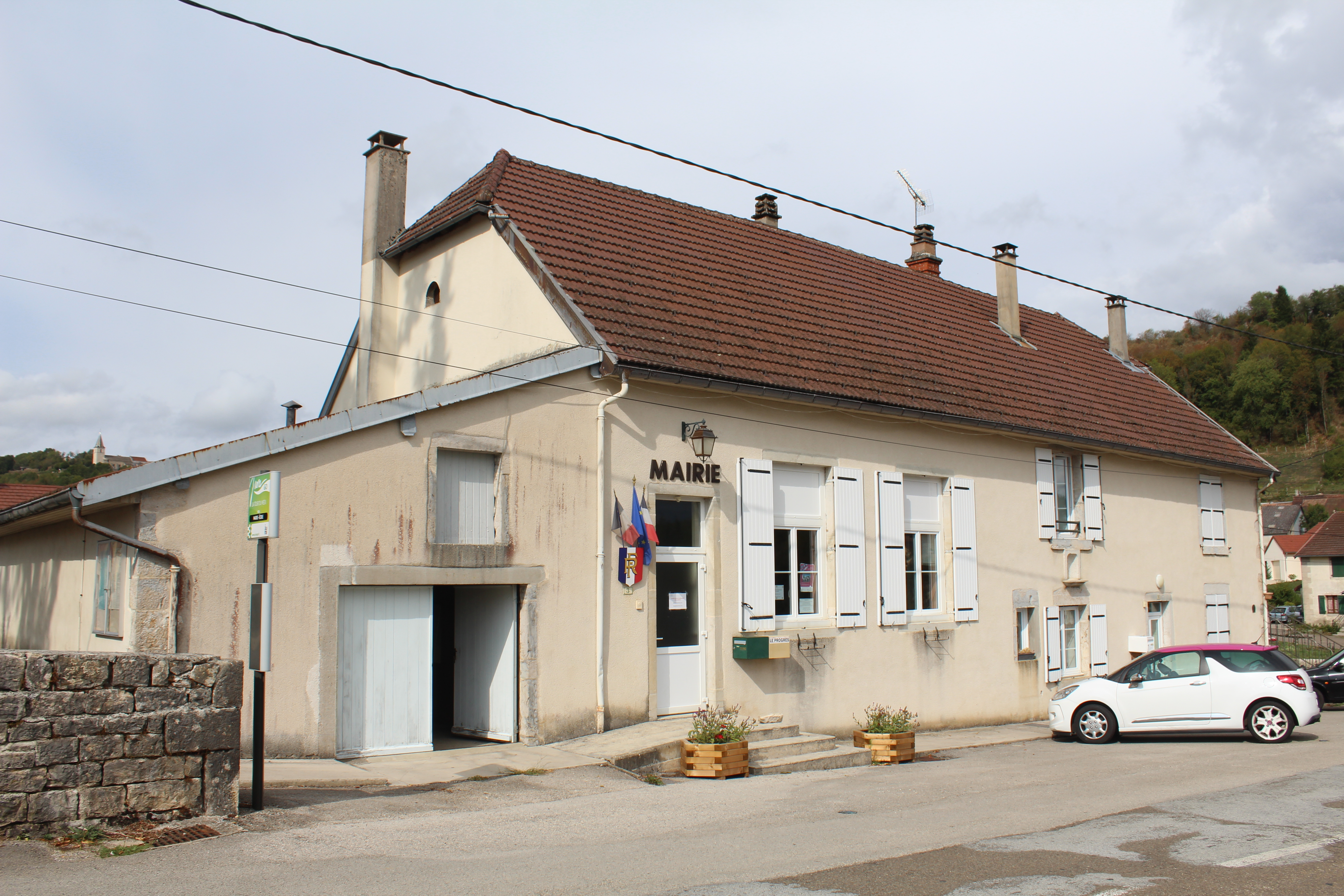
- The town hall in La Tour-du-Meix

- Coat of arms
- Location of La Tour-du-Meix
- Location within France Location within Bourgogne-Franche-Comté
- Coordinates: 46°31′38″N 5°39′47″E
- Country: France
- Region: Bourgogne-Franche-Comté
- Department: Jura
- Arrondissement: Lons-le-Saunier
- Canton: Moirans-en-Montagne

Government
  - Mayor (2020–2026): Sandra Paré
- Area^{1}: 13.42 km^{2} (5.18 sq mi)
- Highest elevation: 686 m (2,251 ft)
- Lowest elevation: 423 m (1,388 ft)
- Population (2023): 261
  - Density: 19.4/km^{2} (50.4/sq mi)
- Time zone: UTC+01:00 (CET)
  - Summer (DST): UTC+02:00 (CEST)
- INSEE/Postal code: 39534 /39270
- ^{1} French Land Register data, which excludes lakes, ponds, glaciers > 1 km^{2} (0.386 sq mi or 247 acres) and river estuaries.

La Tour-du-Meix is a commune in the Jura department in the region of Bourgogne-Franche-Comté in eastern France.

== Population ==
Historical population
Year	Pop.	±% p.a.
1968	189	—
1975	142	−4.00%
1982	156	+1.35%
1990	167	+0.86%
1999	162	−0.34%
2007	216	+3.66%
2012	231	+1.35%
2017	231	+0.00%
2023	261	+2.06%
Source: INSEE

== See also ==
- Communes of the Jura department
