= Vescles =

- Commune
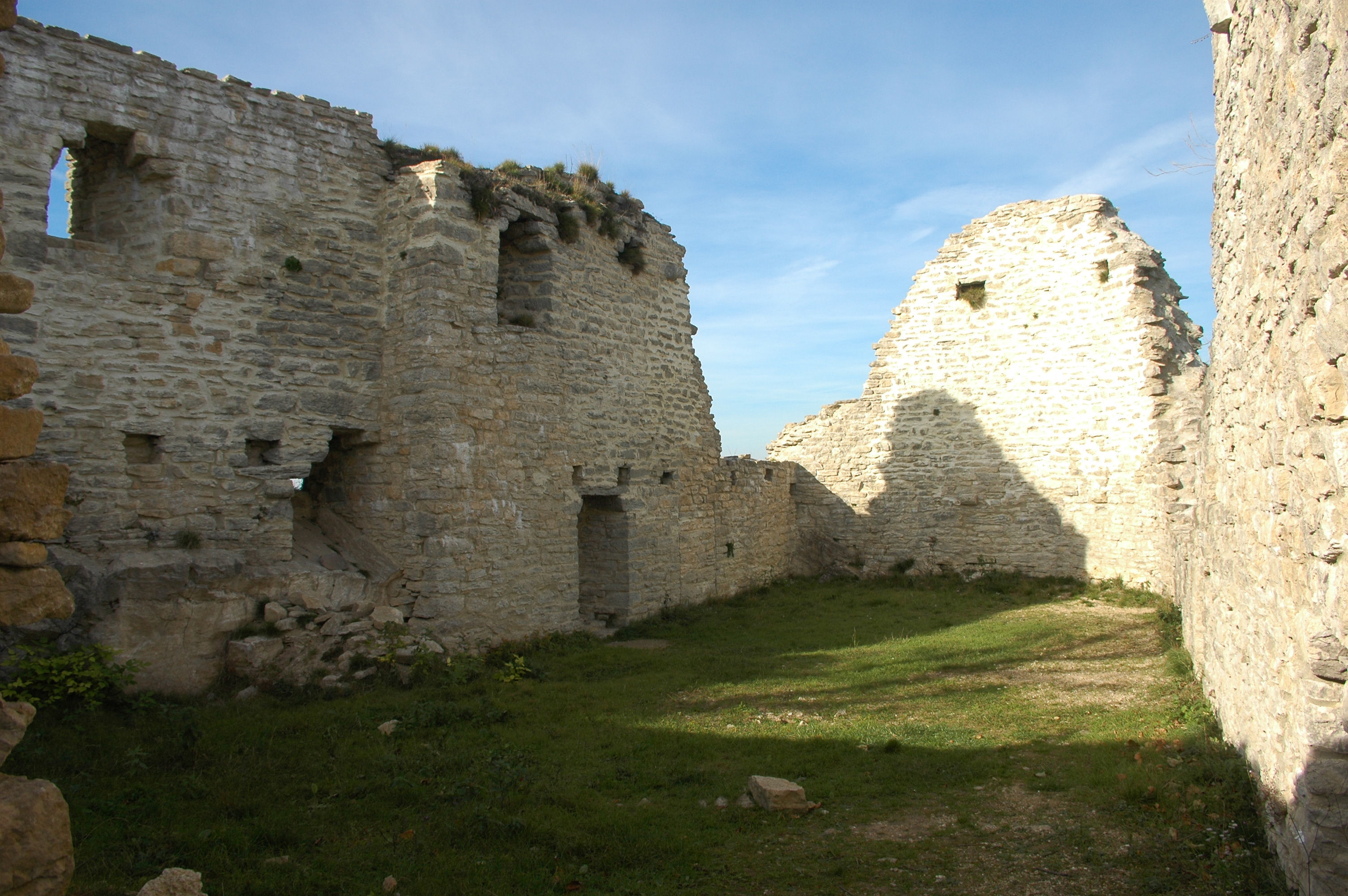
- Ruins of the Château d'Oliferne
- Location of Vescles
- Location within France Location within Bourgogne-Franche-Comté
- Coordinates: 46°21′40″N 5°36′50″E
- Country: France
- Region: Bourgogne-Franche-Comté
- Department: Jura
- Arrondissement: Lons-le-Saunier
- Canton: Moirans-en-Montagne

Government
  - Mayor (2020–2026): Jean-Pierre Boisson
- Area^{1}: 20.27 km^{2} (7.83 sq mi)
- Highest elevation: 800 m (2,600 ft)
- Lowest elevation: 305 m (1,001 ft)
- Population (2023): 181
  - Density: 8.93/km^{2} (23.1/sq mi)
- Time zone: UTC+01:00 (CET)
  - Summer (DST): UTC+02:00 (CEST)
- INSEE/Postal code: 39557 /39240
- ^{1} French Land Register data, which excludes lakes, ponds, glaciers > 1 km^{2} (0.386 sq mi or 247 acres) and river estuaries.

Vescles (French pronunciation: [vɛskl]) is a commune in the Jura department in the Bourgogne-Franche-Comté region in eastern France.

== Population ==
Historical population
Year	Pop.	±% p.a.
1968	156	—
1975	153	−0.28%
1982	143	−0.96%
1990	167	+1.96%
1999	183	+1.02%
2007	217	+2.15%
2012	218	+0.09%
2017	193	−2.41%
2023	181	−1.06%
Source: INSEE

== See also ==
- Communes of the Jura department
