= Pimorin =

Commune in Bourgogne-Franche-Comté, France

- Commune
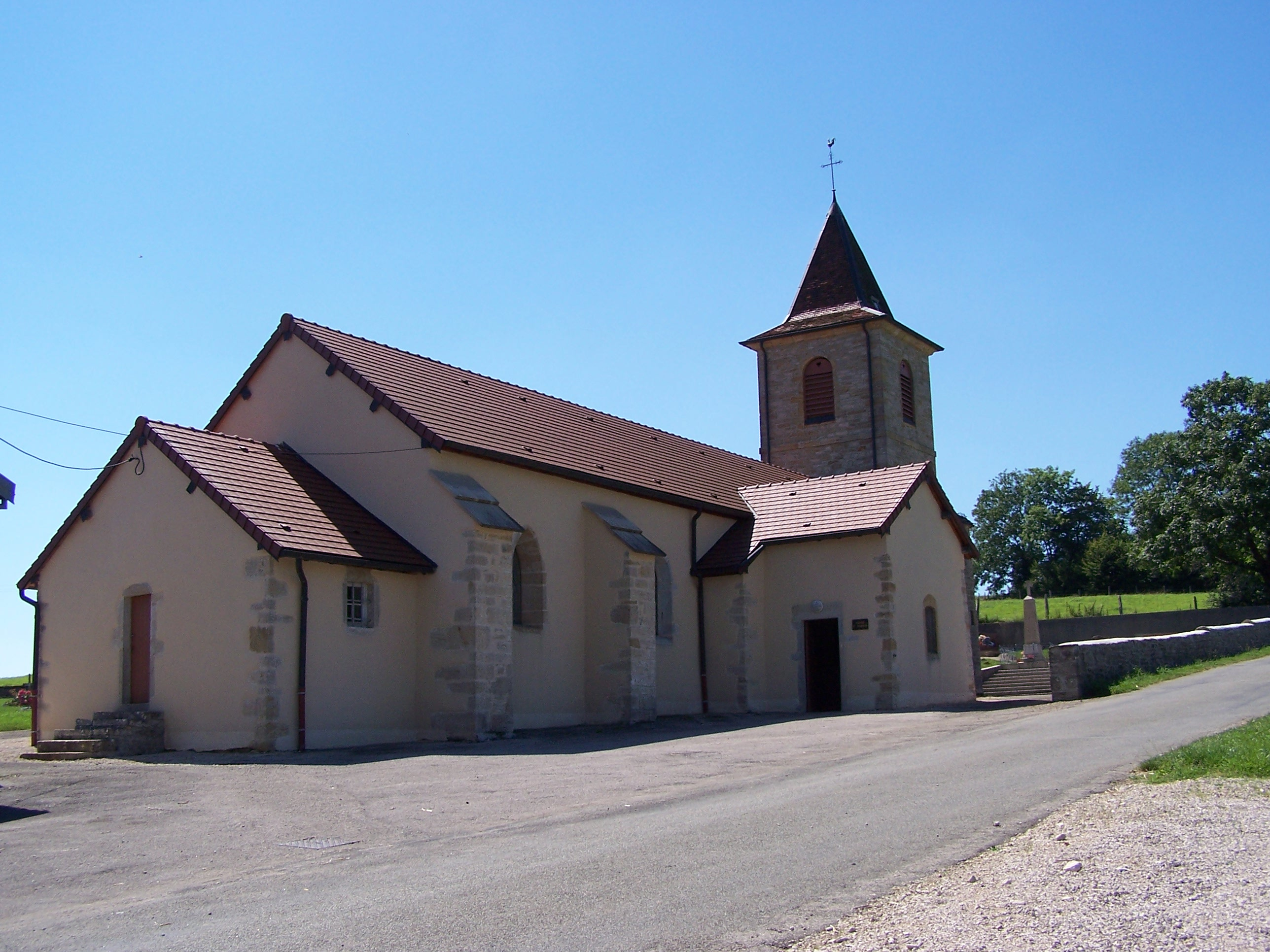
- The church in Pimorin
- Location of Pimorin
- Location within France Location within Bourgogne-Franche-Comté
- Coordinates: 46°30′16″N 5°30′18″E
- Country: France
- Region: Bourgogne-Franche-Comté
- Department: Jura
- Arrondissement: Lons-le-Saunier
- Canton: Moirans-en-Montagne

Government
  - Mayor (2020–2026): Michel Berthozat
- Area^{1}: 10.29 km^{2} (3.97 sq mi)
- Highest elevation: 641 m (2,103 ft)
- Lowest elevation: 400 m (1,300 ft)
- Population (2023): 209
  - Density: 20.3/km^{2} (52.6/sq mi)
- Time zone: UTC+01:00 (CET)
  - Summer (DST): UTC+02:00 (CEST)
- INSEE/Postal code: 39420 /39270
- ^{1} French Land Register data, which excludes lakes, ponds, glaciers > 1 km^{2} (0.386 sq mi or 247 acres) and river estuaries.

Pimorin (French pronunciation: [pimɔʁɛ̃]) is a commune in the Jura department in Bourgogne-Franche-Comté in eastern France.

== Population ==
Historical population
Year	Pop.	±% p.a.
1968	166	—
1975	132	−3.22%
1982	153	+2.13%
1990	156	+0.24%
1999	158	+0.14%
2007	182	+1.78%
2012	190	+0.86%
2017	198	+0.83%
2023	209	+0.91%
Source: INSEE

== See also ==
- Communes of the Jura department
