= Les Crozets =

Commune in Bourgogne-Franche-Comté, France

- Commune
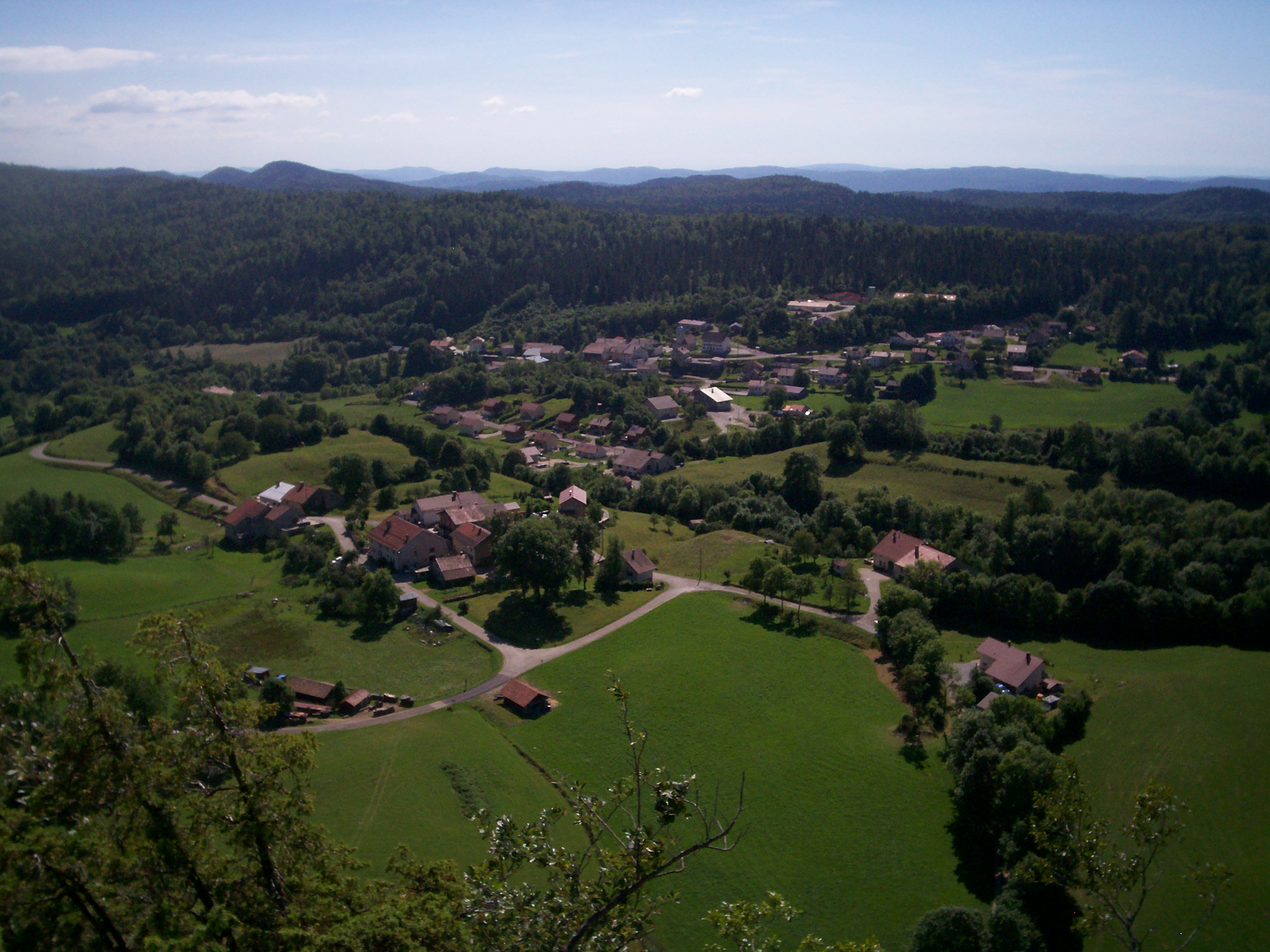
- The village from upon Mont Pelan
- Location of Les Crozets
- Location within France Location within Bourgogne-Franche-Comté
- Coordinates: 46°27′40″N 5°47′42″E
- Country: France
- Region: Bourgogne-Franche-Comté
- Department: Jura
- Arrondissement: Saint-Claude
- Canton: Moirans-en-Montagne

Government
  - Mayor (2020–2026): Catherine Schaeffer
- Area^{1}: 7.59 km^{2} (2.93 sq mi)
- Highest elevation: 1,064 m (3,491 ft)
- Lowest elevation: 720 m (2,360 ft)
- Population (2023): 194
  - Density: 25.6/km^{2} (66.2/sq mi)
- Time zone: UTC+01:00 (CET)
  - Summer (DST): UTC+02:00 (CEST)
- INSEE/Postal code: 39184 /39260
- ^{1} French Land Register data, which excludes lakes, ponds, glaciers > 1 km^{2} (0.386 sq mi or 247 acres) and river estuaries.

Les Crozets (French pronunciation: [le kʁɔzɛ]) is a commune in the Jura department in Bourgogne-Franche-Comté in eastern France.

== Population ==
Historical population
Year	Pop.	±% p.a.
1968	205	—
1975	210	+0.34%
1982	193	−1.20%
1990	188	−0.33%
1999	202	+0.80%
2007	214	+0.72%
2012	214	+0.00%
2017	199	−1.44%
2023	194	−0.42%
Source: INSEE

== Sites and monuments ==
- Church of St. Anthony;
- Fountains (10);
- Old toy factory, today a plastics factory
- Mount Pelan viewpoint

== See also ==
- Communes of the Jura department
