= Canton of Moirans-en-Montagne =

Coordinates: 46.43°N 5.72°E

The canton of Moirans-en-Montagne is an administrative division of the Jura department, eastern France. Its borders were modified at the French canton reorganisation which came into effect in March 2015. Its seat is in Moirans-en-Montagne.

It consists of the following communes:

1. Alièze
2. Arinthod
3. Aromas
4. Beffia
5. La Boissière
6. Cernon
7. Chambéria
8. Chancia
9. Charchilla
10. Charnod
11. Châtel-de-Joux
12. Chavéria
13. Condes
14. Cornod
15. Courbette
16. Coyron
17. Crenans
18. Les Crozets
19. Dompierre-sur-Mont
20. Dramelay
21. Écrille
22. Étival
23. Genod
24. Jeurre
25. Lect
26. Maisod
27. Marigna-sur-Valouse
28. Marnézia
29. Martigna
30. Mérona
31. Meussia
32. Moirans-en-Montagne
33. Montcusel
34. Moutonne
35. Nancuise
36. Onoz
37. Orgelet
38. Pimorin
39. Plaisia
40. Présilly
41. Reithouse
42. Rothonay
43. Saint-Hymetière-sur-Valouse
44. Sarrogna
45. Thoirette-Coisia
46. La Tour-du-Meix
47. Valzin en Petite Montagne
48. Vescles
49. Villards-d'Héria
50. Vosbles-Valfin
