= Cernon, Jura =

Commune in Bourgogne-Franche-Comté, France

Cernon
- Commune
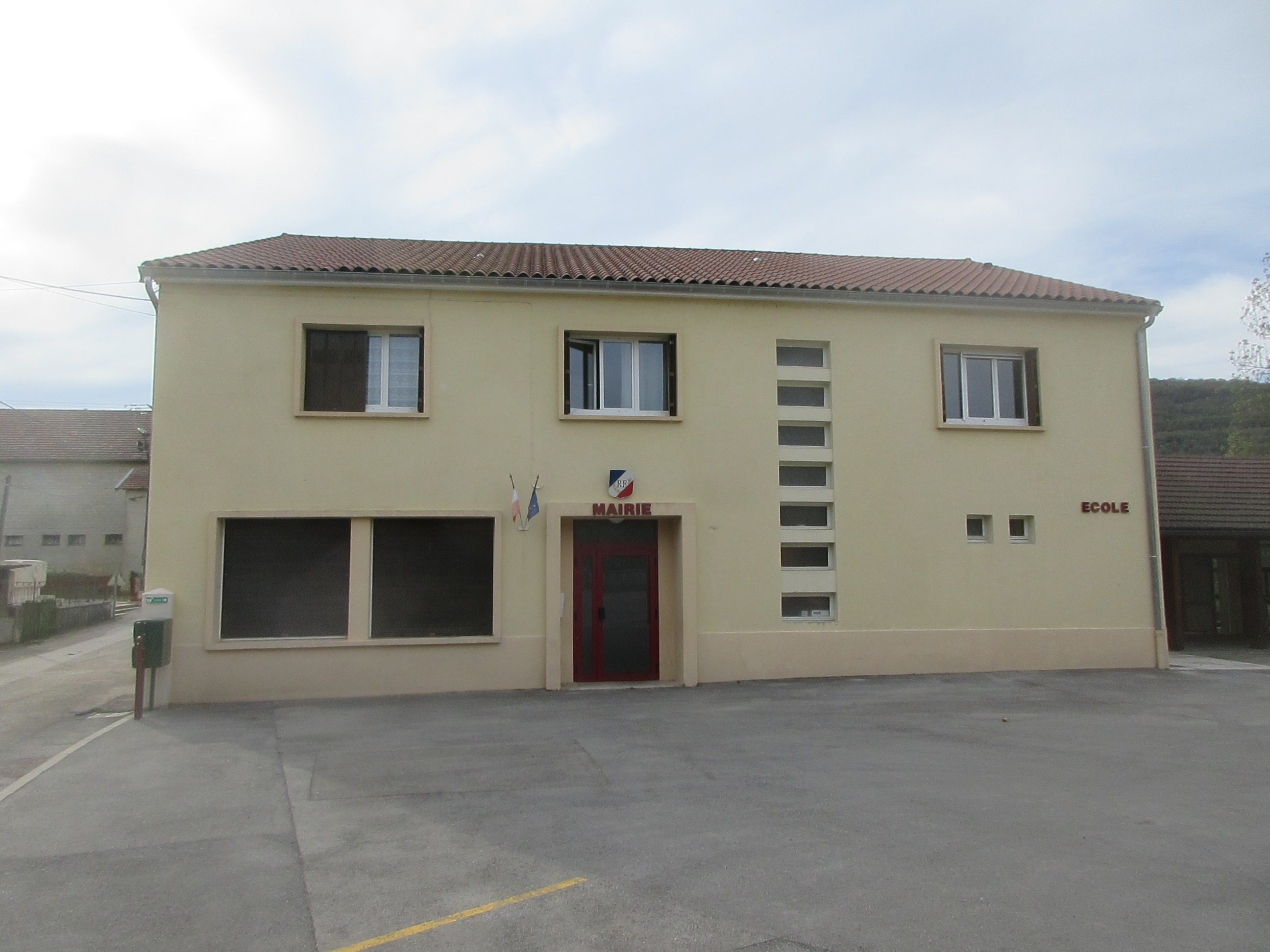
- The town hall in Cernon
- Location of Cernon
- Location within France Location within Bourgogne-Franche-Comté
- Coordinates: 46°24′14″N 5°39′01″E
- Country: France
- Region: Bourgogne-Franche-Comté
- Department: Jura
- Arrondissement: Lons-le-Saunier
- Canton: Moirans-en-Montagne

Government
  - Mayor (2020–2026): Bernard Rude
- Area^{1}: 16.45 km^{2} (6.35 sq mi)
- Highest elevation: 801 m (2,628 ft)
- Lowest elevation: 307 m (1,007 ft)
- Population (2023): 235
  - Density: 14.3/km^{2} (37.0/sq mi)
- Time zone: UTC+01:00 (CET)
  - Summer (DST): UTC+02:00 (CEST)
- INSEE/Postal code: 39086 /39240
- ^{1} French Land Register data, which excludes lakes, ponds, glaciers > 1 km^{2} (0.386 sq mi or 247 acres) and river estuaries.

Cernon (French pronunciation: [sɛʁnɔ̃]) is a commune in the Jura department in Bourgogne-Franche-Comté in eastern France.

== Population ==
Historical population
Year	Pop.	±% p.a.
1968	313	—
1975	228	−4.43%
1982	225	−0.19%
1990	268	+2.21%
1999	254	−0.59%
2007	251	−0.15%
2012	264	+1.02%
2017	251	−1.00%
2023	235	−1.09%
Source: INSEE

== See also ==
- Communes of the Jura department
