= Dompierre-sur-Mont =

Commune in Bourgogne-Franche-Comté, France

- Commune
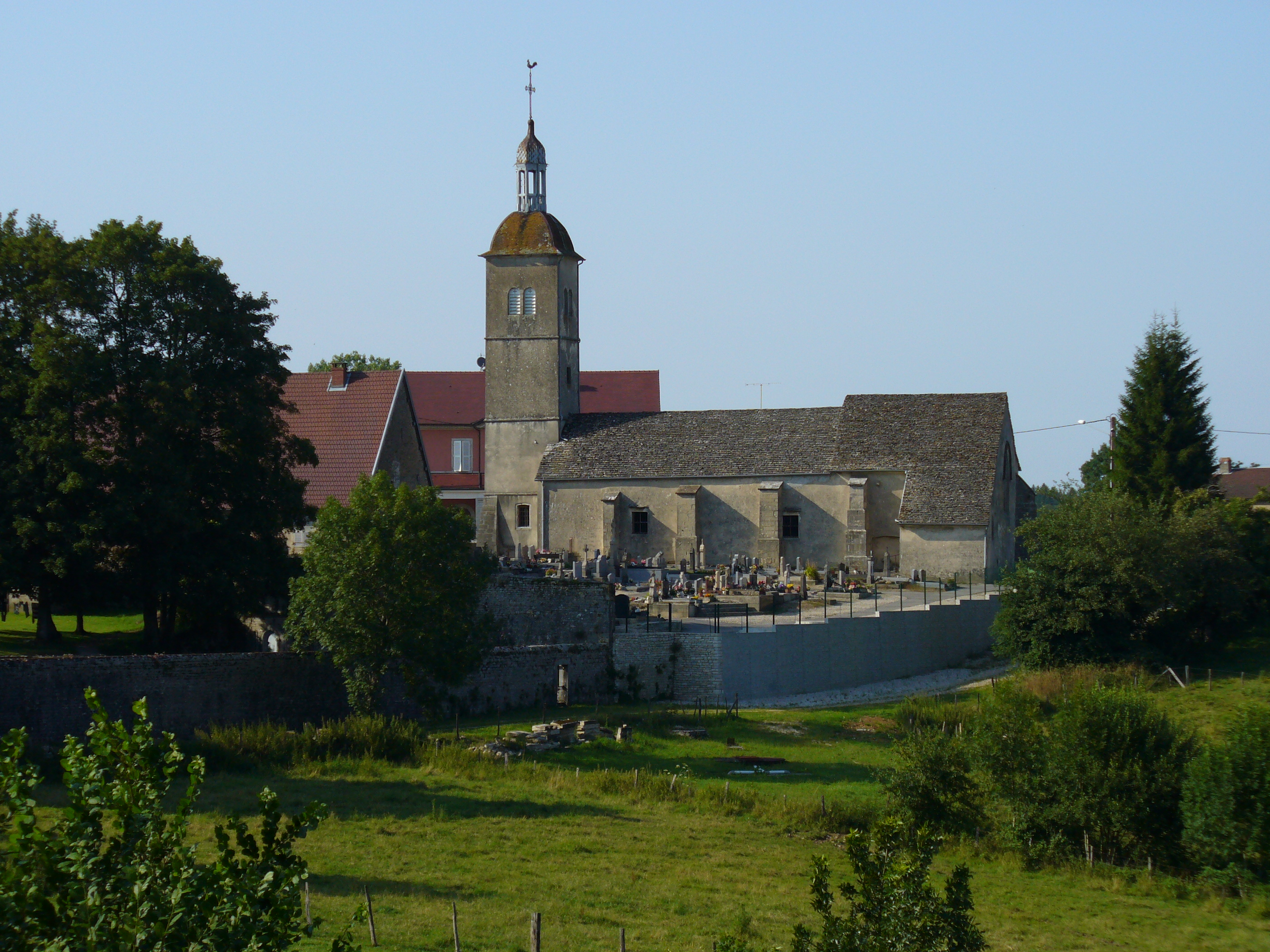
- The church in Dompierre-sur-Mont
- Location of Dompierre-sur-Mont
- Location within France Location within Bourgogne-Franche-Comté
- Coordinates: 46°33′35″N 5°36′34″E
- Country: France
- Region: Bourgogne-Franche-Comté
- Department: Jura
- Arrondissement: Lons-le-Saunier
- Canton: Moirans-en-Montagne

Government
  - Mayor (2020–2026): Guy Piétriga
- Area^{1}: 7.37 km^{2} (2.85 sq mi)
- Highest elevation: 644 m (2,113 ft)
- Lowest elevation: 486 m (1,594 ft)
- Population (2023): 210
  - Density: 28/km^{2} (74/sq mi)
- Time zone: UTC+01:00 (CET)
  - Summer (DST): UTC+02:00 (CEST)
- INSEE/Postal code: 39200 /39270
- ^{1} French Land Register data, which excludes lakes, ponds, glaciers > 1 km^{2} (0.386 sq mi or 247 acres) and river estuaries.

Dompierre-sur-Mont (French pronunciation: [dɔ̃pjɛʁ syʁ mɔ̃]) is a commune in the Jura department in Bourgogne-Franche-Comté in eastern France.

== Population ==
Historical population
Year	Pop.	±% p.a.
1968	116	—
1975	138	+2.51%
1982	193	+4.91%
1990	171	−1.50%
1999	179	+0.51%
2007	228	+3.07%
2012	244	+1.37%
2017	230	−1.17%
2023	210	−1.50%
Source: INSEE

== See also ==
- Communes of the Jura department
