= Rothonay =

Commune in Bourgogne-Franche-Comté, France

- Commune
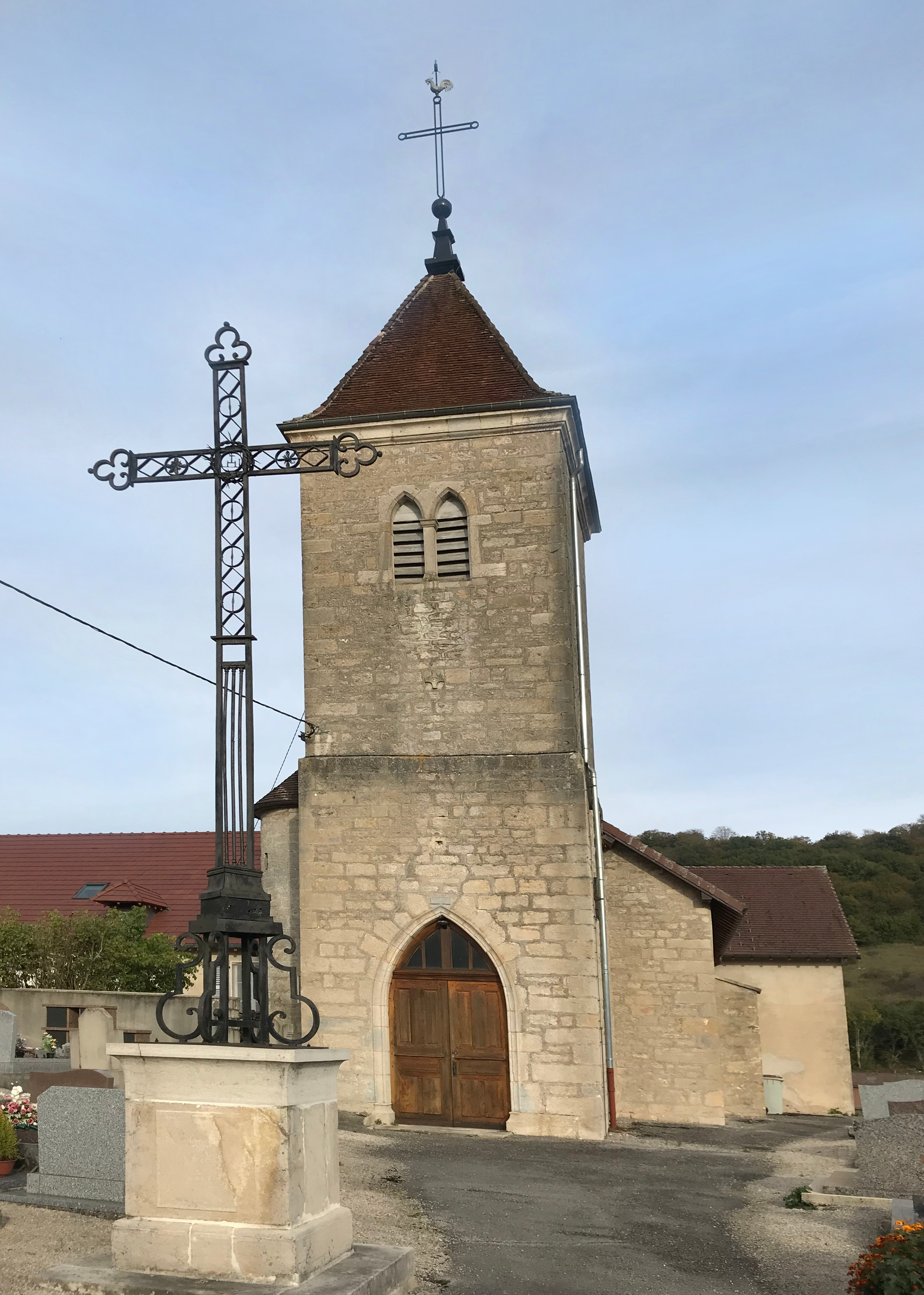
- The church in Rothonay
- Location of Rothonay
- Location within France Location within Bourgogne-Franche-Comté
- Coordinates: 46°31′33″N 5°31′58″E
- Country: France
- Region: Bourgogne-Franche-Comté
- Department: Jura
- Arrondissement: Lons-le-Saunier
- Canton: Moirans-en-Montagne

Government
  - Mayor (2021–2026): Antoine Vuitton
- Area^{1}: 12.98 km^{2} (5.01 sq mi)
- Highest elevation: 591 m (1,939 ft)
- Lowest elevation: 449 m (1,473 ft)
- Population (2023): 128
  - Density: 9.86/km^{2} (25.5/sq mi)
- Time zone: UTC+01:00 (CET)
  - Summer (DST): UTC+02:00 (CEST)
- INSEE/Postal code: 39468 /39270
- ^{1} French Land Register data, which excludes lakes, ponds, glaciers > 1 km^{2} (0.386 sq mi or 247 acres) and river estuaries.

Rothonay (French pronunciation: [ʁɔtɔnɛ]) is a commune in the Jura department and Bourgogne-Franche-Comté region of eastern France.

== Population ==
Historical population
Year	Pop.	±% p.a.
1968	169	—
1975	148	−1.88%
1982	132	−1.62%
1990	123	−0.88%
1999	143	+1.69%
2007	117	−2.48%
2012	130	+2.13%
2017	135	+0.76%
2023	128	−0.88%
Source: INSEE

== See also ==
- Communes of the Jura department
