= Charchilla =

Commune in Bourgogne-Franche-Comté, France

- Commune
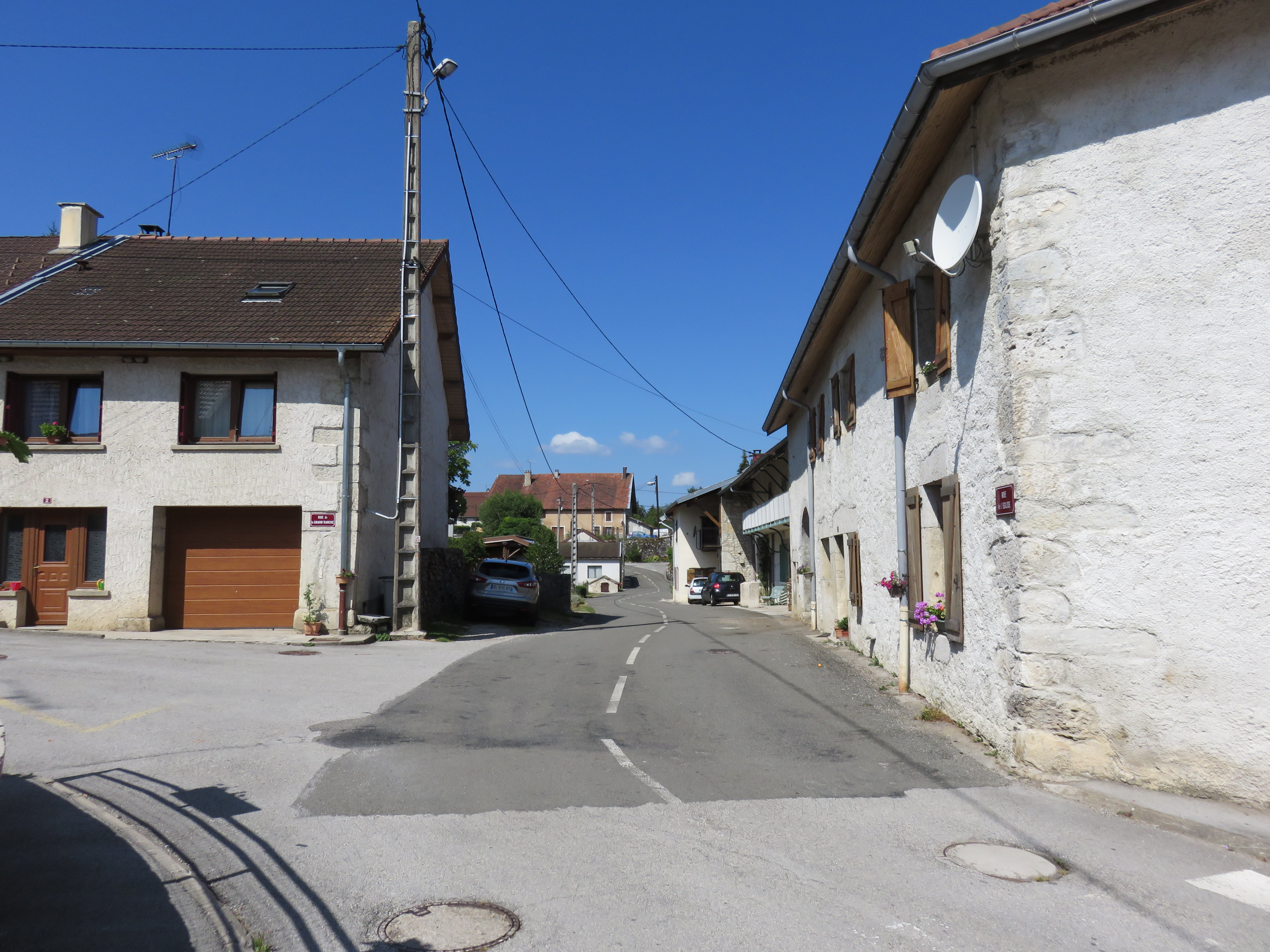
- The main street of Charchilla in 2018.
- Location of Charchilla
- Location within France Location within Bourgogne-Franche-Comté
- Coordinates: 46°27′59″N 5°42′46″E
- Country: France
- Region: Bourgogne-Franche-Comté
- Department: Jura
- Arrondissement: Saint-Claude
- Canton: Moirans-en-Montagne

Government
  - Mayor (2020–2026): Claude Bénier-Rollet
- Area^{1}: 6.84 km^{2} (2.64 sq mi)
- Highest elevation: 690 m (2,260 ft)
- Lowest elevation: 450 m (1,480 ft)
- Population (2023): 302
  - Density: 44.2/km^{2} (114/sq mi)
- Time zone: UTC+01:00 (CET)
  - Summer (DST): UTC+02:00 (CEST)
- INSEE/Postal code: 39106 /39260
- ^{1} French Land Register data, which excludes lakes, ponds, glaciers > 1 km^{2} (0.386 sq mi or 247 acres) and river estuaries.

Charchilla (French pronunciation: [ʃaʁʃija]) is a commune in the Jura department in Bourgogne-Franche-Comté in eastern France.

== Population ==
Historical population
| Year | Pop. | ±% p.a. |
|---|---|---|
| 1968 | 159 | — |
| 1975 | 173 | +1.21% |
| 1982 | 233 | +4.35% |
| 1990 | 251 | +0.93% |
| 1999 | 249 | −0.09% |
| 2007 | 221 | −1.48% |
| 2012 | 267 | +3.85% |
| 2017 | 280 | +0.96% |
| 2023 | 302 | +1.27% |
Source: INSEE

== See also ==
- Communes of the Jura department
