= Marnézia =

Commune in Bourgogne-Franche-Comté, France

- Commune
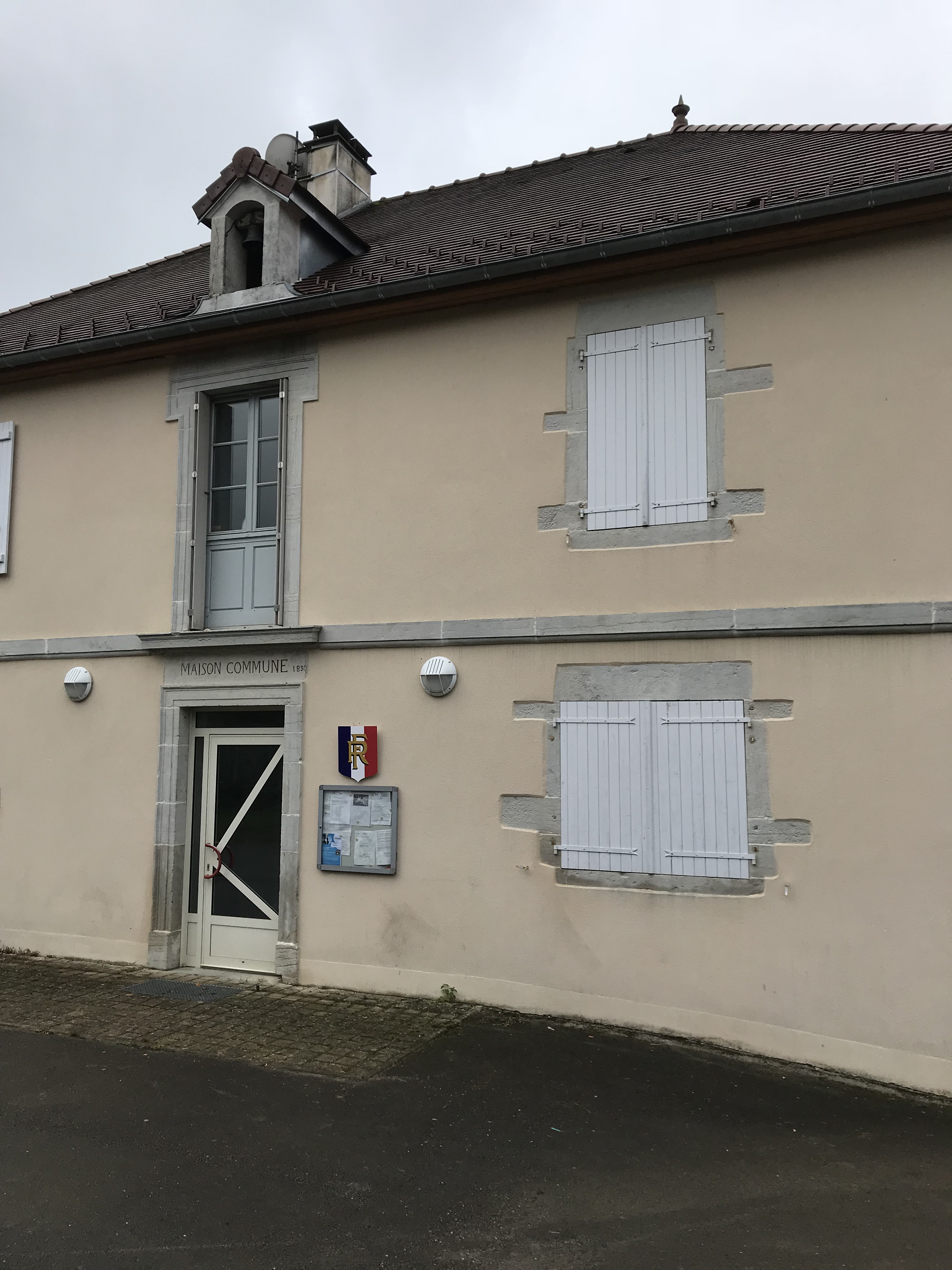
- The town hall in Marnézia
- Location of Marnézia
- Location within France Location within Bourgogne-Franche-Comté
- Coordinates: 46°34′32″N 5°38′29″E
- Country: France
- Region: Bourgogne-Franche-Comté
- Department: Jura
- Arrondissement: Lons-le-Saunier
- Canton: Moirans-en-Montagne

Government
  - Mayor (2020–2026): Patrice Faton
- Area^{1}: 4.97 km^{2} (1.92 sq mi)
- Highest elevation: 703 m (2,306 ft)
- Lowest elevation: 507 m (1,663 ft)
- Population (2023): 65
  - Density: 13/km^{2} (34/sq mi)
- Time zone: UTC+01:00 (CET)
  - Summer (DST): UTC+02:00 (CEST)
- INSEE/Postal code: 39314 /39270
- ^{1} French Land Register data, which excludes lakes, ponds, glaciers > 1 km^{2} (0.386 sq mi or 247 acres) and river estuaries.

Marnézia (French pronunciation: [maʁnezja]) is a commune in the Jura department in Bourgogne-Franche-Comté in eastern France.

== Population ==
Historical population
| Year | Pop. | ±% p.a. |
|---|---|---|
| 1968 | 62 | — |
| 1975 | 52 | −2.48% |
| 1982 | 48 | −1.14% |
| 1990 | 46 | −0.53% |
| 1999 | 48 | +0.47% |
| 2007 | 84 | +7.25% |
| 2012 | 93 | +2.06% |
| 2017 | 90 | −0.65% |
| 2023 | 65 | −5.28% |
Source: INSEE

== See also ==
- Communes of the Jura department
