= Charnod =

Commune in Bourgogne-Franche-Comté, France

- Commune
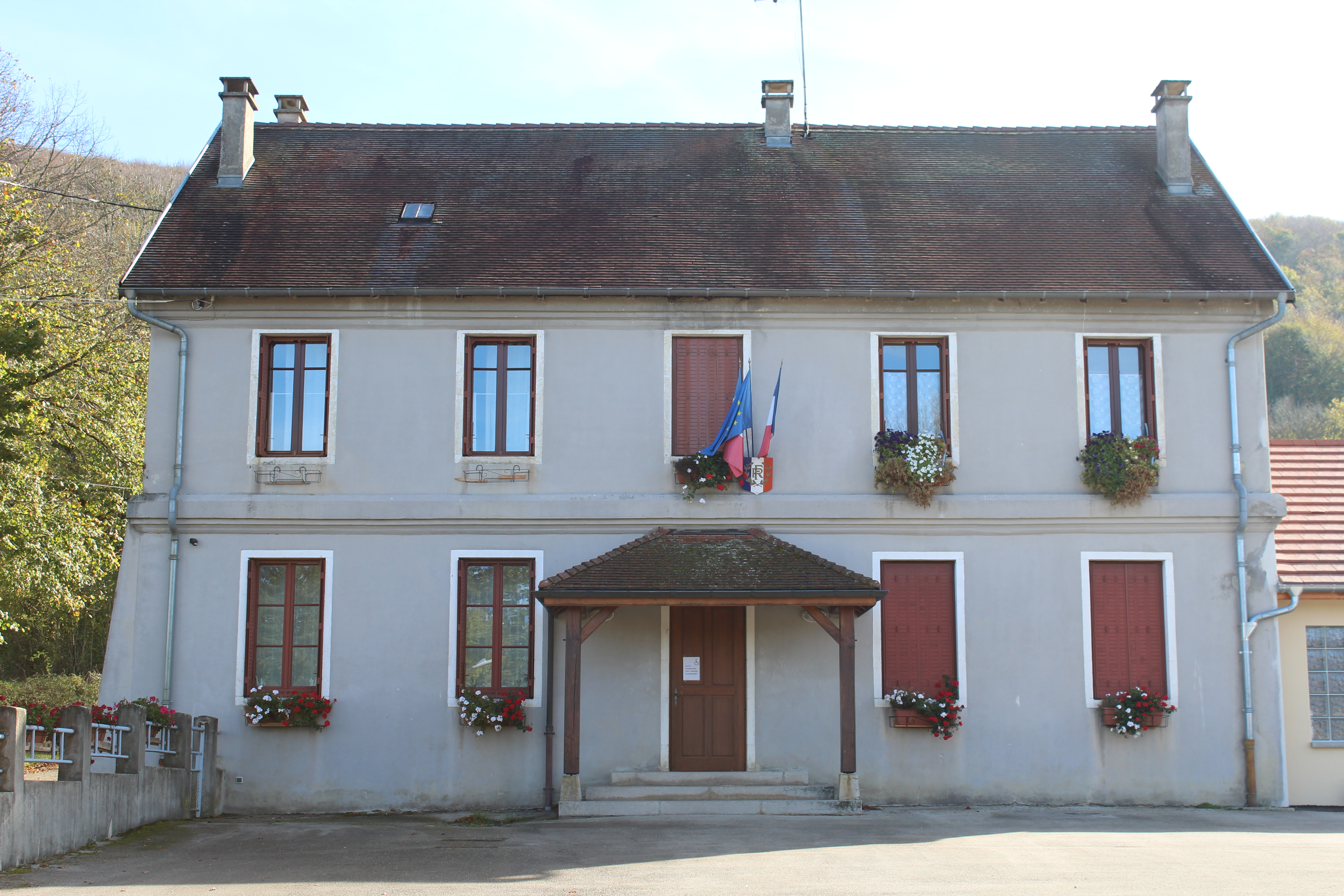
- The town hall in Charnod
- Location of Charnod
- Location within France Location within Bourgogne-Franche-Comté
- Coordinates: 46°20′03″N 5°29′25″E
- Country: France
- Region: Bourgogne-Franche-Comté
- Department: Jura
- Arrondissement: Lons-le-Saunier
- Canton: Moirans-en-Montagne

Government
  - Mayor (2020–2026): Micheline Colin
- Area^{1}: 5.17 km^{2} (2.00 sq mi)
- Highest elevation: 685 m (2,247 ft)
- Lowest elevation: 480 m (1,570 ft)
- Population (2023): 37
  - Density: 7.2/km^{2} (19/sq mi)
- Time zone: UTC+01:00 (CET)
  - Summer (DST): UTC+02:00 (CEST)
- INSEE/Postal code: 39111 /39240
- ^{1} French Land Register data, which excludes lakes, ponds, glaciers > 1 km^{2} (0.386 sq mi or 247 acres) and river estuaries.

Charnod (French pronunciation: [ʃaʁno]) is a commune in the Jura department in Bourgogne-Franche-Comté in eastern France.

== Population ==
Historical population
Year	Pop.	±% p.a.
1968	67	—
1975	62	−1.10%
1982	57	−1.19%
1990	50	−1.62%
1999	43	−1.66%
2007	47	+1.12%
2012	44	−1.31%
2017	40	−1.89%
2023	37	−1.29%
Source: INSEE

== See also ==
- Communes of the Jura department
