= Martigna =

Commune in Bourgogne-Franche-Comté, France

- Commune
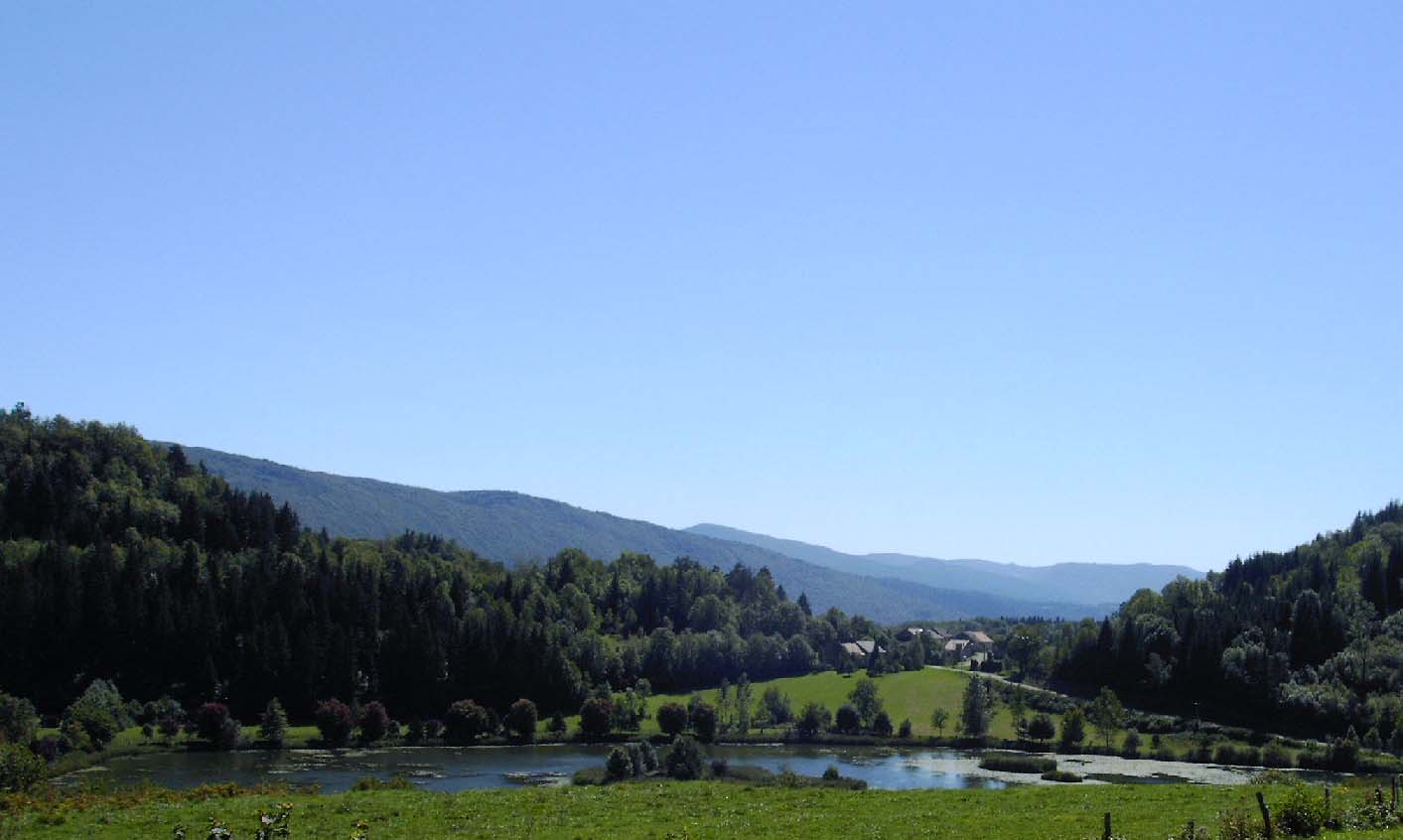
- Lac de Chanon
- Location of Martigna
- Location within France Location within Bourgogne-Franche-Comté
- Coordinates: 46°23′N 5°42′E
- Country: France
- Region: Bourgogne-Franche-Comté
- Department: Jura
- Arrondissement: Saint-Claude
- Canton: Moirans-en-Montagne

Government
  - Mayor (2020–2026): Jean-Claude Dalloz
- Area^{1}: 8.77 km^{2} (3.39 sq mi)
- Highest elevation: 774 m (2,539 ft)
- Lowest elevation: 500 m (1,600 ft)
- Population (2023): 215
  - Density: 24.5/km^{2} (63.5/sq mi)
- Time zone: UTC+01:00 (CET)
  - Summer (DST): UTC+02:00 (CEST)
- INSEE/Postal code: 39318 /39260
- ^{1} French Land Register data, which excludes lakes, ponds, glaciers > 1 km^{2} (0.386 sq mi or 247 acres) and river estuaries.

Martigna (French pronunciation: [maʁtiɲa]) is a commune in the Jura department in Bourgogne-Franche-Comté in eastern France.

== Population ==
Historical population
Year	Pop.	±% p.a.
1968	153	—
1975	159	+0.55%
1982	153	−0.55%
1990	164	+0.87%
1999	193	+1.83%
2007	205	+0.76%
2012	205	+0.00%
2017	194	−1.10%
2023	215	+1.73%
Source: INSEE

== See also ==
- Communes of the Jura department
