= Plaisia =

Commune in Bourgogne-Franche-Comté, France

- Commune
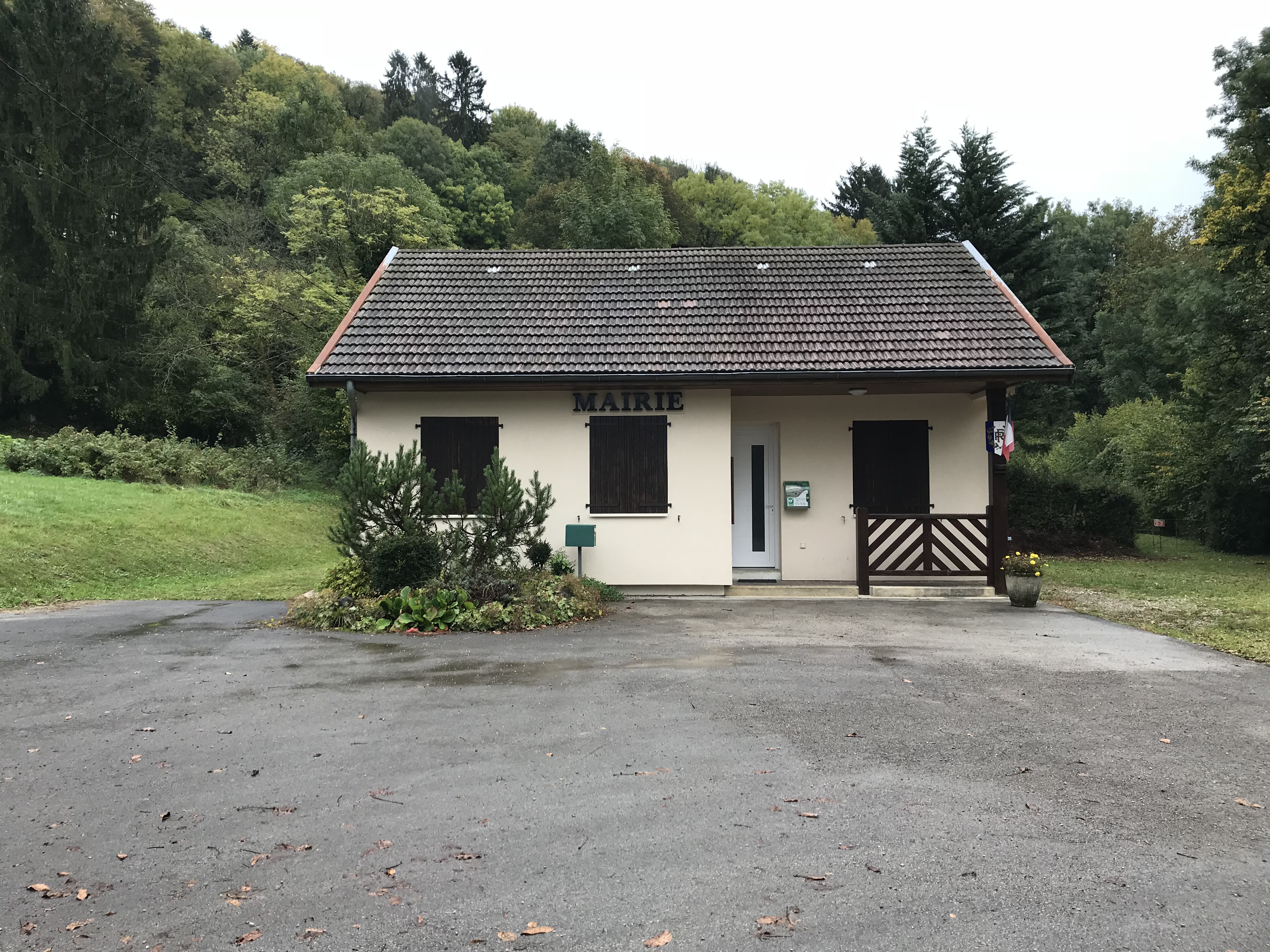
- Town hall of Plaisia.
- Location of Plaisia
- Location within France Location within Bourgogne-Franche-Comté
- Coordinates: 46°32′00″N 5°38′03″E
- Country: France
- Region: Bourgogne-Franche-Comté
- Department: Jura
- Arrondissement: Lons-le-Saunier
- Canton: Moirans-en-Montagne

Government
  - Mayor (2020–2026): Jean-Marc Boilletot
- Area^{1}: 5.31 km^{2} (2.05 sq mi)
- Highest elevation: 690 m (2,260 ft)
- Lowest elevation: 420 m (1,380 ft)
- Population (2023): 96
  - Density: 18/km^{2} (47/sq mi)
- Time zone: UTC+01:00 (CET)
  - Summer (DST): UTC+02:00 (CEST)
- INSEE/Postal code: 39423 /39270
- ^{1} French Land Register data, which excludes lakes, ponds, glaciers > 1 km^{2} (0.386 sq mi or 247 acres) and river estuaries.

Plaisia (French pronunciation: [plɛzja]) is a commune in the Jura department in Bourgogne-Franche-Comté in eastern France.

== Population ==
Historical population
Year	Pop.	±% p.a.
1968	94	—
1975	90	−0.62%
1982	100	+1.52%
1990	97	−0.38%
1999	115	+1.91%
2007	112	−0.33%
2012	119	+1.22%
2017	107	−2.10%
2023	96	−1.79%
Source: INSEE

== See also ==
- Communes of the Jura department
