= Maisod =

Commune in Bourgogne-Franche-Comté, France

- Commune
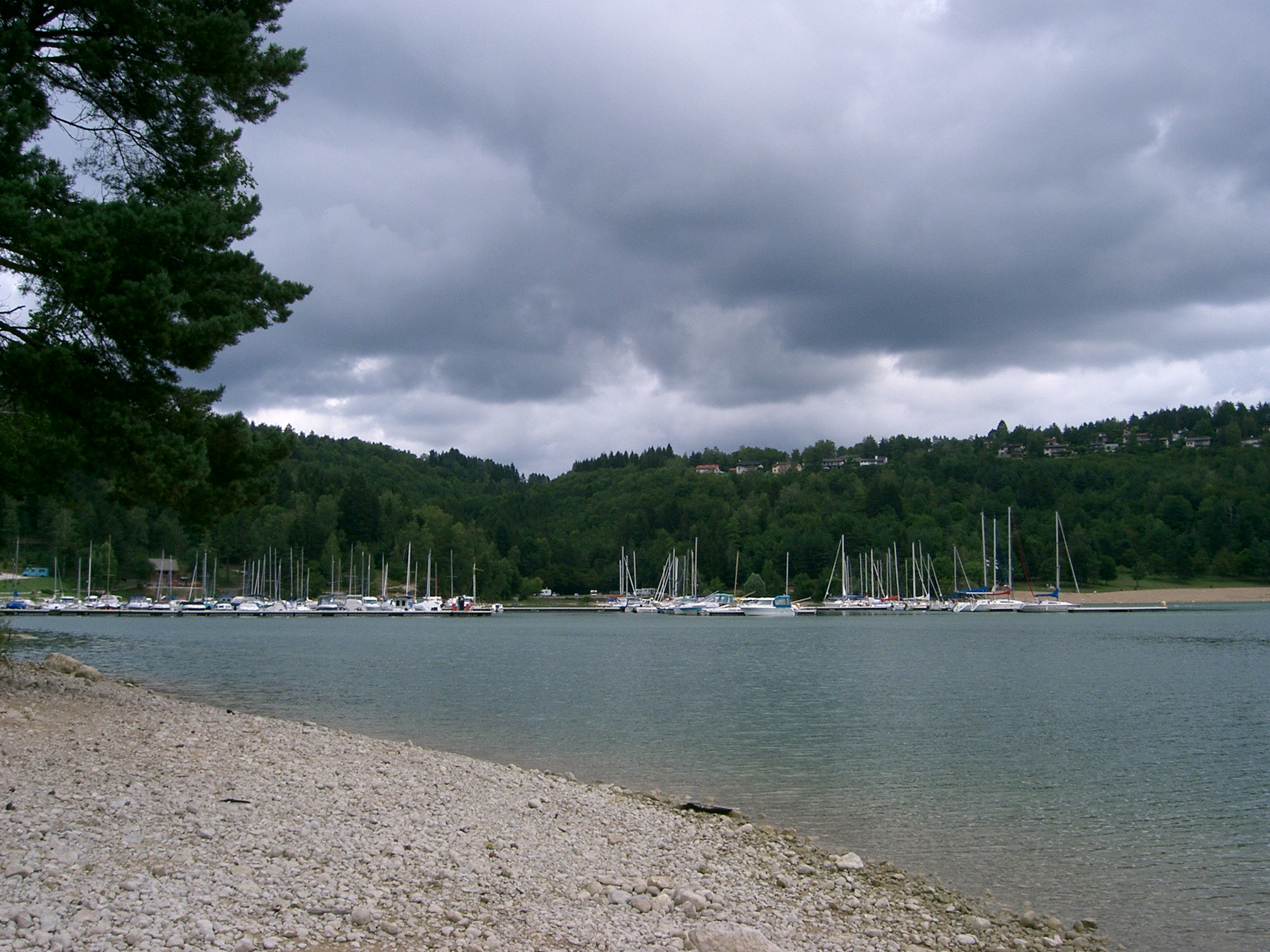
- Lac de Vouglans
- Location of Maisod
- Location within France Location within Bourgogne-Franche-Comté
- Coordinates: 46°28′39″N 5°41′24″E
- Country: France
- Region: Bourgogne-Franche-Comté
- Department: Jura
- Arrondissement: Saint-Claude
- Canton: Moirans-en-Montagne

Government
  - Mayor (2026–32): Philippe Perciot
- Area^{1}: 7.39 km^{2} (2.85 sq mi)
- Highest elevation: 553 m (1,814 ft)
- Lowest elevation: 423 m (1,388 ft)
- Population (2023): 326
  - Density: 44.1/km^{2} (114/sq mi)
- Time zone: UTC+01:00 (CET)
  - Summer (DST): UTC+02:00 (CEST)
- INSEE/Postal code: 39307 /39260
- ^{1} French Land Register data, which excludes lakes, ponds, glaciers > 1 km^{2} (0.386 sq mi or 247 acres) and river estuaries.

Maisod (French pronunciation: [mɛzo]) is a commune in the Jura department in Bourgogne-Franche-Comté in eastern France.

== Population ==
Historical population
Year	Pop.	±% p.a.
1968	122	—
1975	133	+1.24%
1982	162	+2.86%
1990	203	+2.86%
1999	271	+3.26%
2007	311	+1.74%
2012	331	+1.25%
2017	329	−0.12%
2023	326	−0.15%
Source: INSEE

== See also ==
- Communes of the Jura department
