= Chavéria =

Commune in Bourgogne-Franche-Comté, France

- Commune
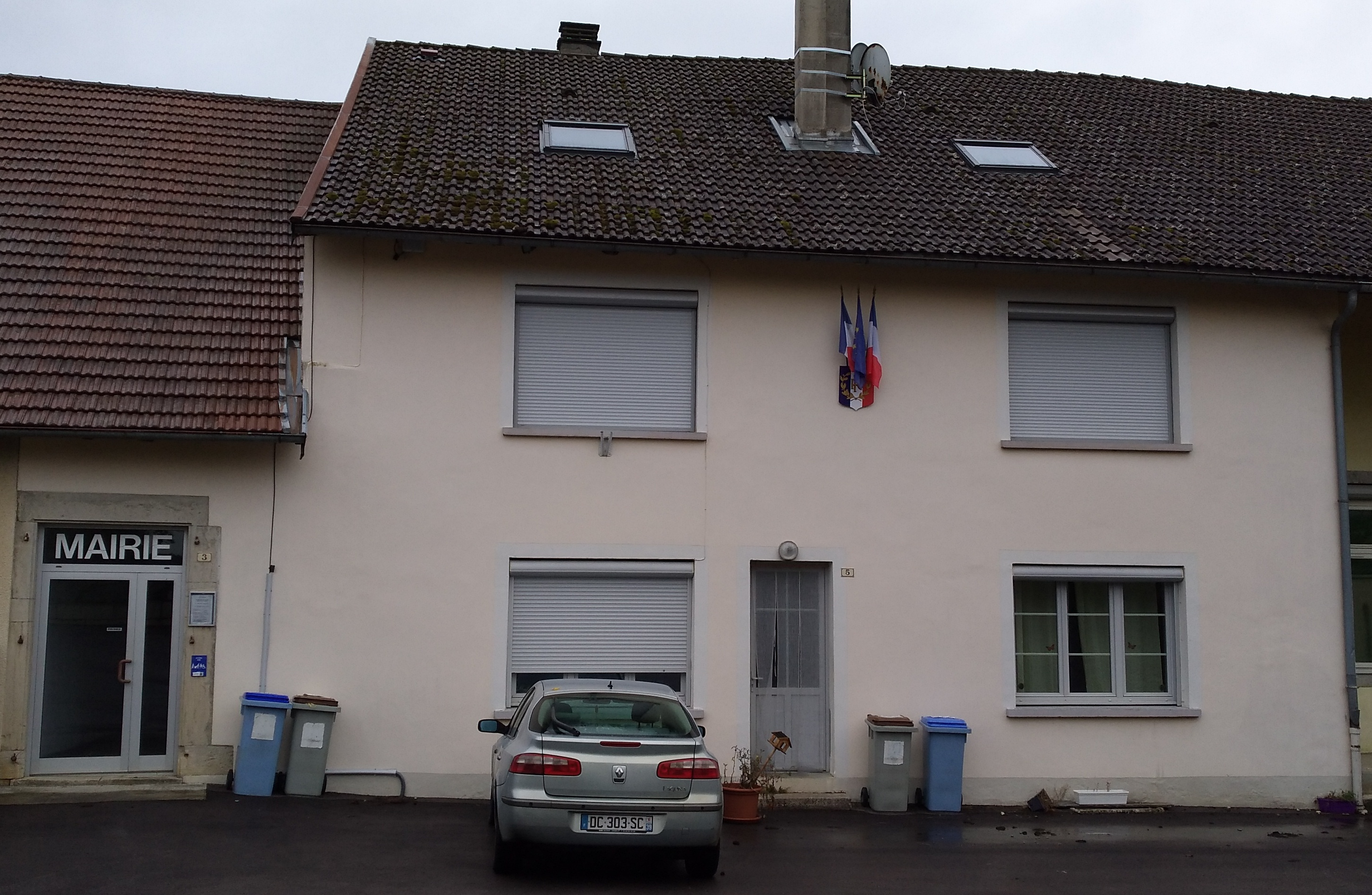
- The town hall in Chavéria
- Location of Chavéria
- Location within France Location within Bourgogne-Franche-Comté
- Coordinates: 46°30′31″N 5°34′04″E
- Country: France
- Region: Bourgogne-Franche-Comté
- Department: Jura
- Arrondissement: Lons-le-Saunier
- Canton: Moirans-en-Montagne

Government
  - Mayor (2020–2026): Patrick Chamouton
- Area^{1}: 10.22 km^{2} (3.95 sq mi)
- Highest elevation: 620 m (2,030 ft)
- Lowest elevation: 380 m (1,250 ft)
- Population (2023): 201
  - Density: 19.7/km^{2} (50.9/sq mi)
- Time zone: UTC+01:00 (CET)
  - Summer (DST): UTC+02:00 (CEST)
- INSEE/Postal code: 39134 /39270
- ^{1} French Land Register data, which excludes lakes, ponds, glaciers > 1 km^{2} (0.386 sq mi or 247 acres) and river estuaries.

Chavéria (French pronunciation: [ʃaveʁja]) is a commune in the Jura department in Bourgogne-Franche-Comté in eastern France.

== Population ==
Historical population
Year	Pop.	±% p.a.
1968	202	—
1975	167	−2.68%
1982	137	−2.79%
1990	141	+0.36%
1999	171	+2.17%
2007	206	+2.35%
2012	240	+3.10%
2017	226	−1.19%
2023	201	−1.93%
Source: INSEE

== See also ==
- Communes of the Jura department
