= Lect, Jura =

Commune in Bourgogne-Franche-Comté, France

Lect
- Commune
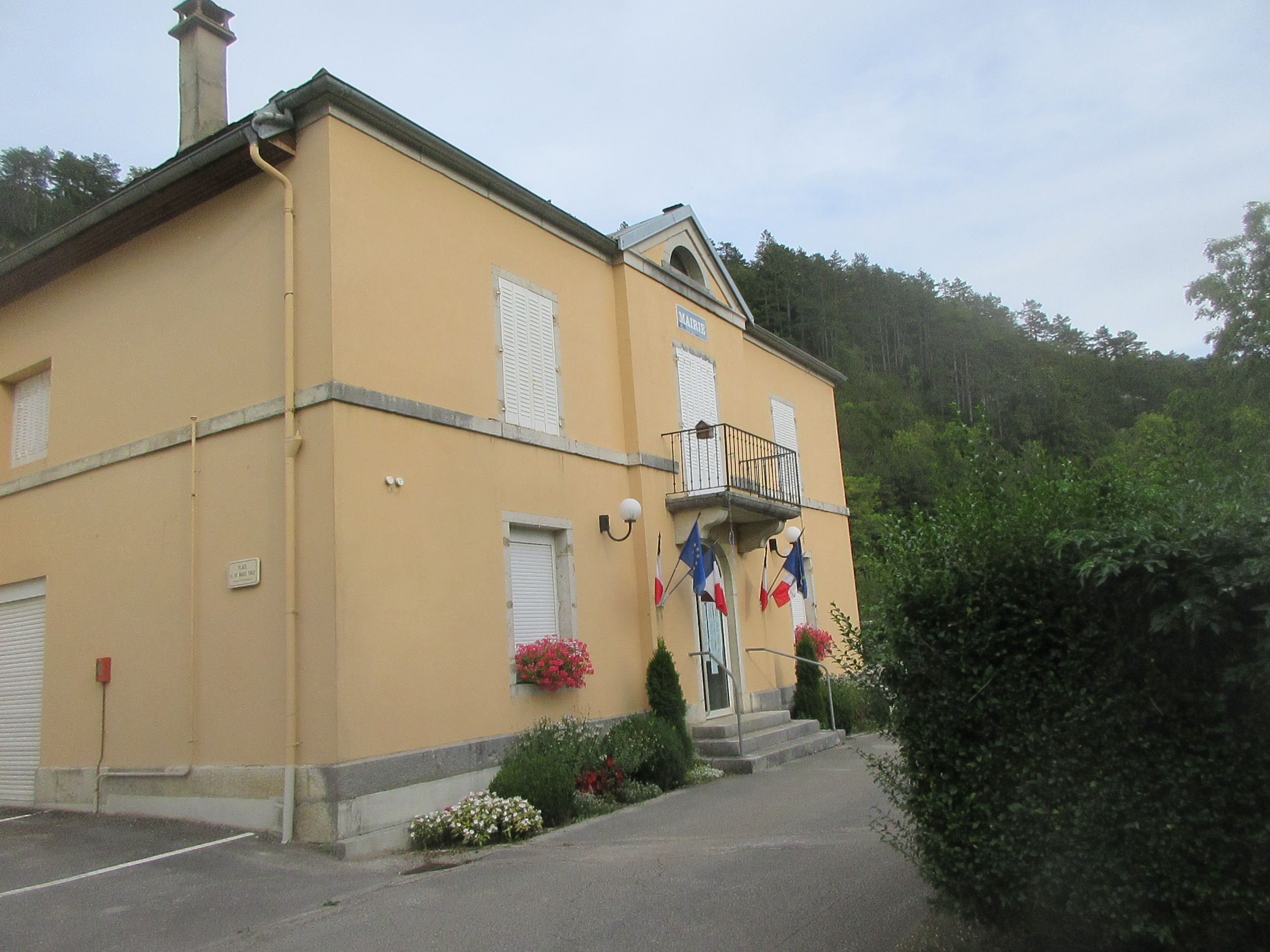
- The town hall in Lect
- Location of Lect
- Location within France Location within Bourgogne-Franche-Comté
- Coordinates: 46°23′24″N 5°40′36″E
- Country: France
- Region: Bourgogne-Franche-Comté
- Department: Jura
- Arrondissement: Saint-Claude
- Canton: Moirans-en-Montagne

Government
  - Mayor (2020–2026): Dominique Retord
- Area^{1}: 11.94 km^{2} (4.61 sq mi)
- Highest elevation: 743 m (2,438 ft)
- Lowest elevation: 306 m (1,004 ft)
- Population (2023): 319
  - Density: 26.7/km^{2} (69.2/sq mi)
- Time zone: UTC+01:00 (CET)
  - Summer (DST): UTC+02:00 (CEST)
- INSEE/Postal code: 39289 /39260
- ^{1} French Land Register data, which excludes lakes, ponds, glaciers > 1 km^{2} (0.386 sq mi or 247 acres) and river estuaries.

Lect (French pronunciation: [lɛkt]) is a commune in the Jura department in Bourgogne-Franche-Comté in eastern France. The hamlet of Vouglans has been attached to Lect since 1822.

== Population ==
Historical population
Year	Pop.	±% p.a.
1968	841	—
1975	273	−14.85%
1982	280	+0.36%
1990	266	−0.64%
1999	352	+3.16%
2007	381	+0.99%
2012	365	−0.85%
2017	354	−0.61%
2023	319	−1.72%
Source: INSEE

The large population decrease after 1968 can be explained by the construction of the dam, the reservoir of the hydro-electric power station of the Lac de Vouglans, which required a workforce of more than 500 for five years in the 1960s.

== See also ==
- Communes of the Jura department
