= Condes, Jura =

Commune in Bourgogne-Franche-Comté, France

Condes
- Commune
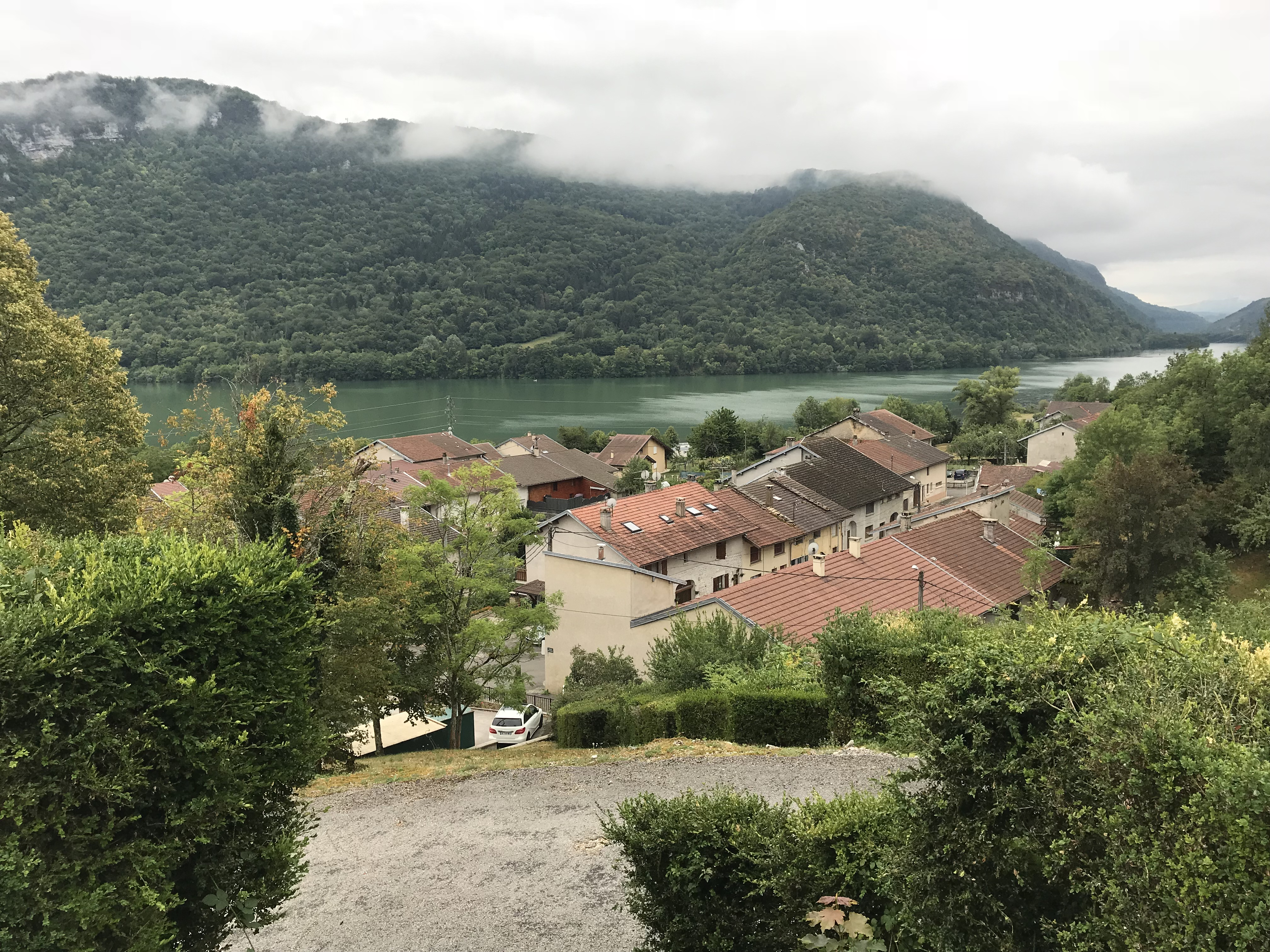
- View of Condes from the church, in 2018
- Location of Condes
- Location within France Location within Bourgogne-Franche-Comté
- Coordinates: 46°20′18″N 5°37′30″E
- Country: France
- Region: Bourgogne-Franche-Comté
- Department: Jura
- Arrondissement: Lons-le-Saunier
- Canton: Moirans-en-Montagne

Government
  - Mayor (2020–2026): Jérôme Benoît
- Area^{1}: 2.05 km^{2} (0.79 sq mi)
- Highest elevation: 600 m (2,000 ft)
- Lowest elevation: 300 m (980 ft)
- Population (2023): 117
  - Density: 57.1/km^{2} (148/sq mi)
- Time zone: UTC+01:00 (CET)
  - Summer (DST): UTC+02:00 (CEST)
- INSEE/Postal code: 39163 /39240
- ^{1} French Land Register data, which excludes lakes, ponds, glaciers > 1 km^{2} (0.386 sq mi or 247 acres) and river estuaries.

Condes (French pronunciation: [kɔ̃d]) is a commune in the Jura department in Bourgogne-Franche-Comté in eastern France.

== Population ==
Historical population
Year	Pop.	±% p.a.
1968	80	—
1975	61	−3.80%
1982	48	−3.37%
1990	53	+1.25%
1999	108	+8.23%
2007	118	+1.11%
2012	116	−0.34%
2017	109	−1.24%
2023	117	+1.19%
Source: INSEE

== See also ==
- Communes of the Jura department
