= Courbette, Jura =

Commune in Bourgogne-Franche-Comté, France

Courbette
- Commune
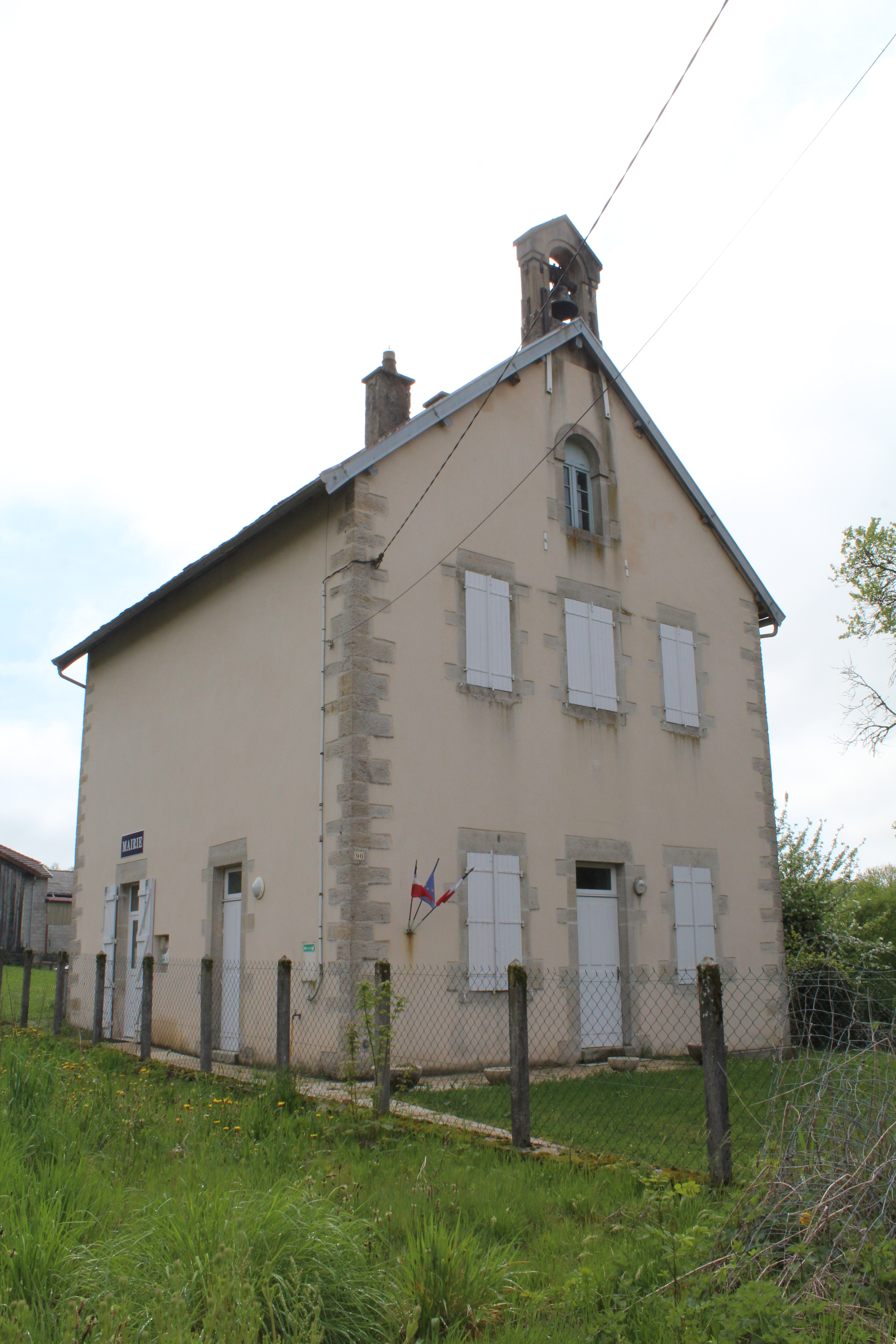
- The town hall in Courbette
- Location of Courbette
- Location within France Location within Bourgogne-Franche-Comté
- Coordinates: 46°35′54″N 5°33′59″E
- Country: France
- Region: Bourgogne-Franche-Comté
- Department: Jura
- Arrondissement: Lons-le-Saunier
- Canton: Moirans-en-Montagne

Government
  - Mayor (2020–2026): Évelyne Guillot
- Area^{1}: 2.65 km^{2} (1.02 sq mi)
- Highest elevation: 625 m (2,051 ft)
- Lowest elevation: 294 m (965 ft)
- Population (2023): 44
  - Density: 17/km^{2} (43/sq mi)
- Time zone: UTC+01:00 (CET)
  - Summer (DST): UTC+02:00 (CEST)
- INSEE/Postal code: 39168 /39570
- ^{1} French Land Register data, which excludes lakes, ponds, glaciers > 1 km^{2} (0.386 sq mi or 247 acres) and river estuaries.

Courbette (French pronunciation: [kuʁbɛt]) is a commune in the Jura department in Bourgogne-Franche-Comté in eastern France.

== Population ==
Historical population
Year	Pop.	±% p.a.
1968	46	—
1975	48	+0.61%
1982	40	−2.57%
1990	43	+0.91%
1999	51	+1.91%
2007	42	−2.40%
2012	42	+0.00%
2017	51	+3.96%
2023	44	−2.43%
Source: INSEE

== See also ==
- Communes of the Jura department
