= Beffia =

Commune in Bourgogne-Franche-Comté, France

- Commune
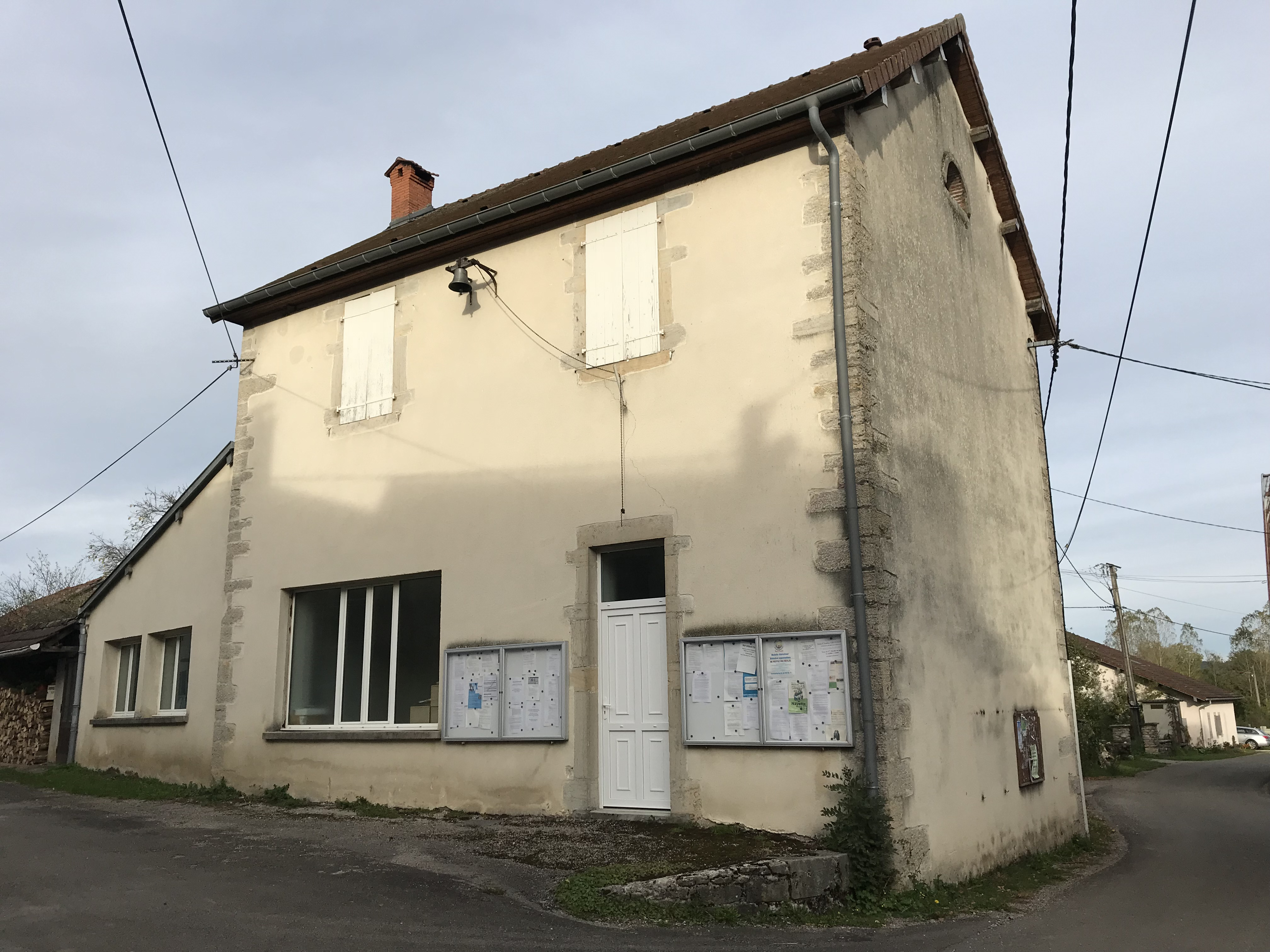
- The town hall in Beffia
- Location of Beffia
- Location within France Location within Bourgogne-Franche-Comté
- Coordinates: 46°31′36″N 5°32′54″E
- Country: France
- Region: Bourgogne-Franche-Comté
- Department: Jura
- Arrondissement: Lons-le-Saunier
- Canton: Moirans-en-Montagne

Government
  - Mayor (2020–2026): Jacques Vial
- Area^{1}: 5.17 km^{2} (2.00 sq mi)
- Highest elevation: 585 m (1,919 ft)
- Lowest elevation: 474 m (1,555 ft)
- Population (2023): 86
  - Density: 17/km^{2} (43/sq mi)
- Time zone: UTC+01:00 (CET)
  - Summer (DST): UTC+02:00 (CEST)
- INSEE/Postal code: 39045 /39270
- ^{1} French Land Register data, which excludes lakes, ponds, glaciers > 1 km^{2} (0.386 sq mi or 247 acres) and river estuaries.

Beffia (French pronunciation: [befja]) is a commune in the Jura department in the region of Bourgogne-Franche-Comté in eastern France.

== Population ==
Historical population
Year	Pop.	±% p.a.
1968	75	—
1975	61	−2.91%
1982	65	+0.91%
1990	72	+1.29%
1999	81	+1.32%
2007	88	+1.04%
2012	76	−2.89%
2017	77	+0.26%
2023	86	+1.86%
Source: INSEE

== See also ==
- Communes of the Jura department
