= Châtel-de-Joux =

Commune in Bourgogne-Franche-Comté, France

- Commune
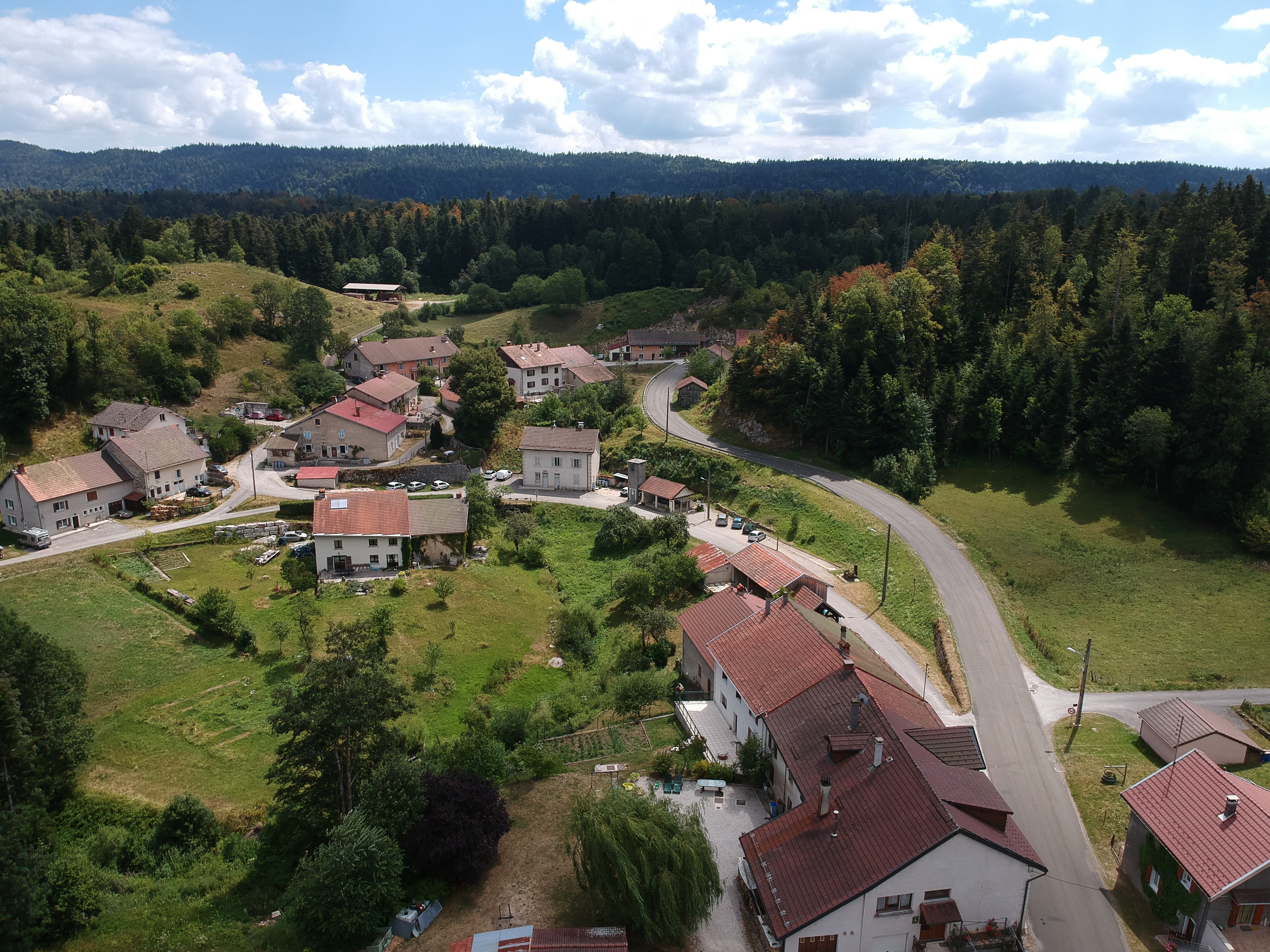
- An aerial view of Châtel-de-Joux

- Coat of arms
- Location of Châtel-de-Joux
- Location within France Location within Bourgogne-Franche-Comté
- Coordinates: 46°31′38″N 5°47′40″E
- Country: France
- Region: Bourgogne-Franche-Comté
- Department: Jura
- Arrondissement: Saint-Claude
- Canton: Moirans-en-Montagne

Government
  - Mayor (2022–2026): Anaïs Pourcelot
- Area^{1}: 14.13 km^{2} (5.46 sq mi)
- Highest elevation: 1,003 m (3,291 ft)
- Lowest elevation: 596 m (1,955 ft)
- Population (2023): 47
  - Density: 3.3/km^{2} (8.6/sq mi)
- Time zone: UTC+01:00 (CET)
  - Summer (DST): UTC+02:00 (CEST)
- INSEE/Postal code: 39118 /39130
- ^{1} French Land Register data, which excludes lakes, ponds, glaciers > 1 km^{2} (0.386 sq mi or 247 acres) and river estuaries.

Châtel-de-Joux (French pronunciation: [ʃatɛl də ʒu]) is a commune in the Jura department in Bourgogne-Franche-Comté in eastern France.

== Population ==
Historical population
Year	Pop.	±% p.a.
1968	72	—
1975	71	−0.20%
1982	66	−1.04%
1990	59	−1.39%
1999	48	−2.27%
2007	53	+1.25%
2012	56	+1.11%
2017	51	−1.85%
2023	47	−1.35%
Source: INSEE

== See also ==
- Communes of the Jura department
