= Onoz, Jura =

Commune in Bourgogne-Franche-Comté, France

Onoz
- Commune
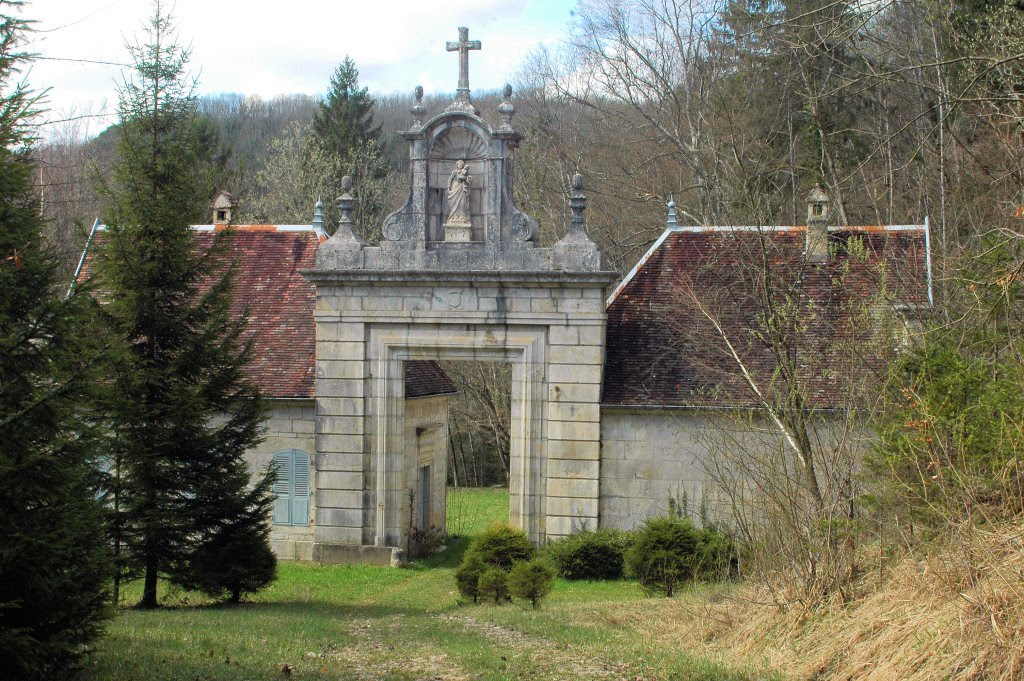
- Gate of the charterhouse of Vaucluse
- Location of Onoz
- Location within France Location within Bourgogne-Franche-Comté
- Coordinates: 46°27′23″N 5°39′12″E
- Country: France
- Region: Bourgogne-Franche-Comté
- Department: Jura
- Arrondissement: Lons-le-Saunier
- Canton: Moirans-en-Montagne

Government
  - Mayor (2020–2026): Jean-Noël Rassau
- Area^{1}: 14.85 km^{2} (5.73 sq mi)
- Highest elevation: 740 m (2,430 ft)
- Lowest elevation: 425 m (1,394 ft)
- Population (2023): 70
  - Density: 4.7/km^{2} (12/sq mi)
- Time zone: UTC+01:00 (CET)
  - Summer (DST): UTC+02:00 (CEST)
- INSEE/Postal code: 39394 /39270
- ^{1} French Land Register data, which excludes lakes, ponds, glaciers > 1 km^{2} (0.386 sq mi or 247 acres) and river estuaries.

Onoz is a commune in the Jura department in Bourgogne-Franche-Comté in eastern France.

== Population ==
Historical population
Year	Pop.	±% p.a.
1968	123	—
1975	89	−4.52%
1982	79	−1.69%
1990	66	−2.22%
1999	61	−0.87%
2007	82	+3.77%
2012	93	+2.55%
2017	72	−4.99%
2023	70	−0.47%
Source: INSEE

== See also ==
- Communes of the Jura department
