= Châtillon, Jura =

Châtillon, Jura may refer to:

- Châtillon, Jura, Switzerland, a municipality in the district of Delémont, Canton of Jura, Switzerland
- Châtillon, Jura, France, a commune in the Jura département, France
