= Molain =

Molain may refer to the following places in France:

- Molain, Aisne, a commune in the department of Aisne
- Molain, Jura, a commune in the department of Jura
