= Lavigny =

Lavigny may refer to the following places:

- Lavigny, Jura, France
- Lavigny, Switzerland
