= Le Vernois =

- Commune
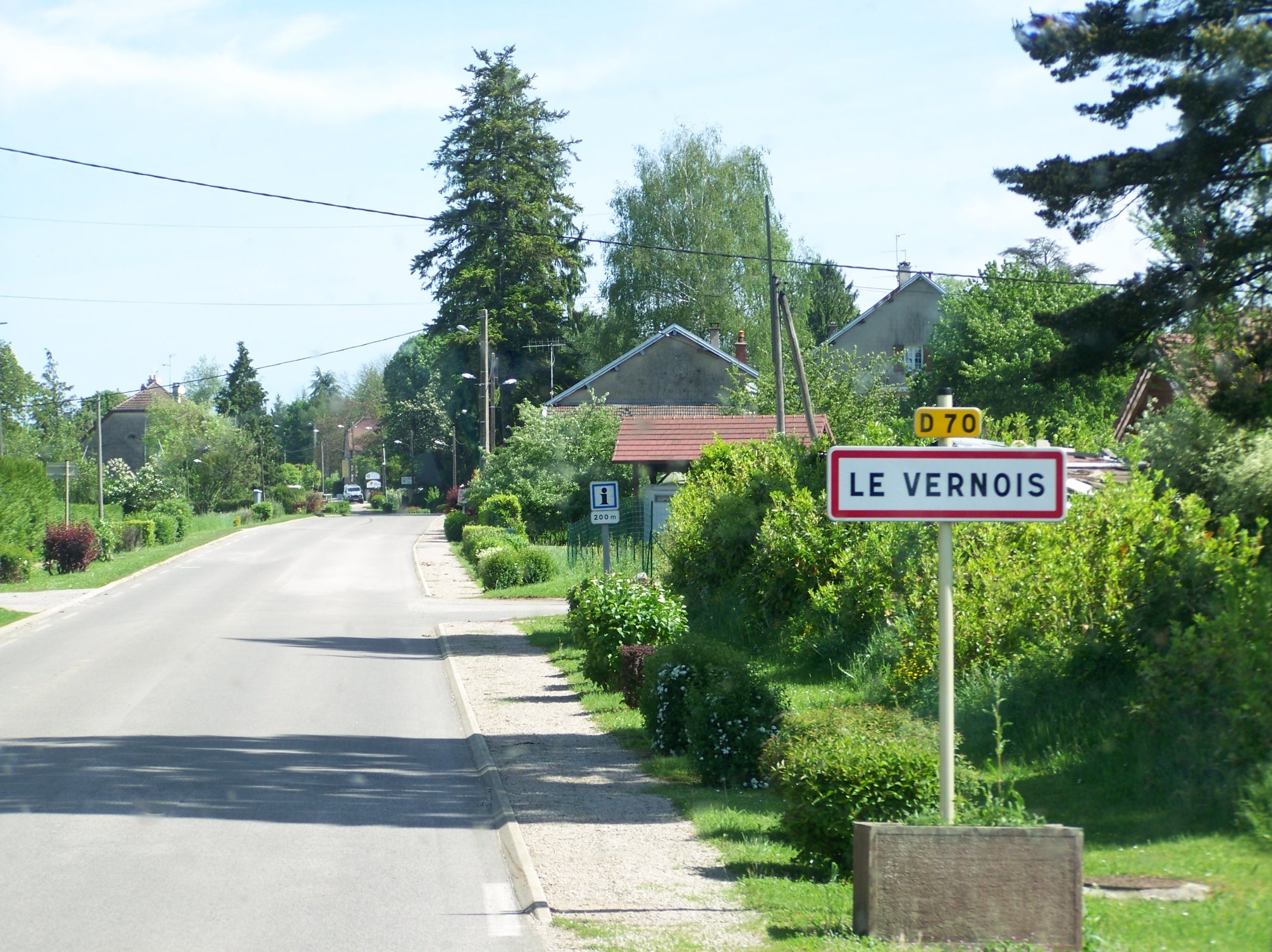
- The road into Le Vernois

- Coat of arms
- Location of Le Vernois
- Location within France Location within Bourgogne-Franche-Comté
- Coordinates: 46°43′55″N 5°35′39″E
- Country: France
- Region: Bourgogne-Franche-Comté
- Department: Jura
- Arrondissement: Lons-le-Saunier
- Canton: Poligny

Government
  - Mayor (2020–2026): Denis Legrand
- Area^{1}: 1.08 km^{2} (0.42 sq mi)
- Highest elevation: 317 m (1,040 ft)
- Lowest elevation: 269 m (883 ft)
- Population (2023): 285
  - Density: 264/km^{2} (683/sq mi)
- Time zone: UTC+01:00 (CET)
  - Summer (DST): UTC+02:00 (CEST)
- INSEE/Postal code: 39553 /39210
- ^{1} French Land Register data, which excludes lakes, ponds, glaciers > 1 km^{2} (0.386 sq mi or 247 acres) and river estuaries.

Le Vernois (French pronunciation: [lə vɛʁnwa]) is a commune in the Jura department in Bourgogne-Franche-Comté in eastern France.

== Population ==
Historical population
Year	Pop.	±% p.a.
1968	142	—
1975	135	−0.72%
1982	220	+7.23%
1990	229	+0.50%
1999	232	+0.14%
2007	270	+1.91%
2012	286	+1.16%
2017	308	+1.49%
2023	285	−1.29%
Source: INSEE

== See also ==
- Communes of the Jura department
