= Buvilly =

Commune in Bourgogne-Franche-Comté, France

- Commune
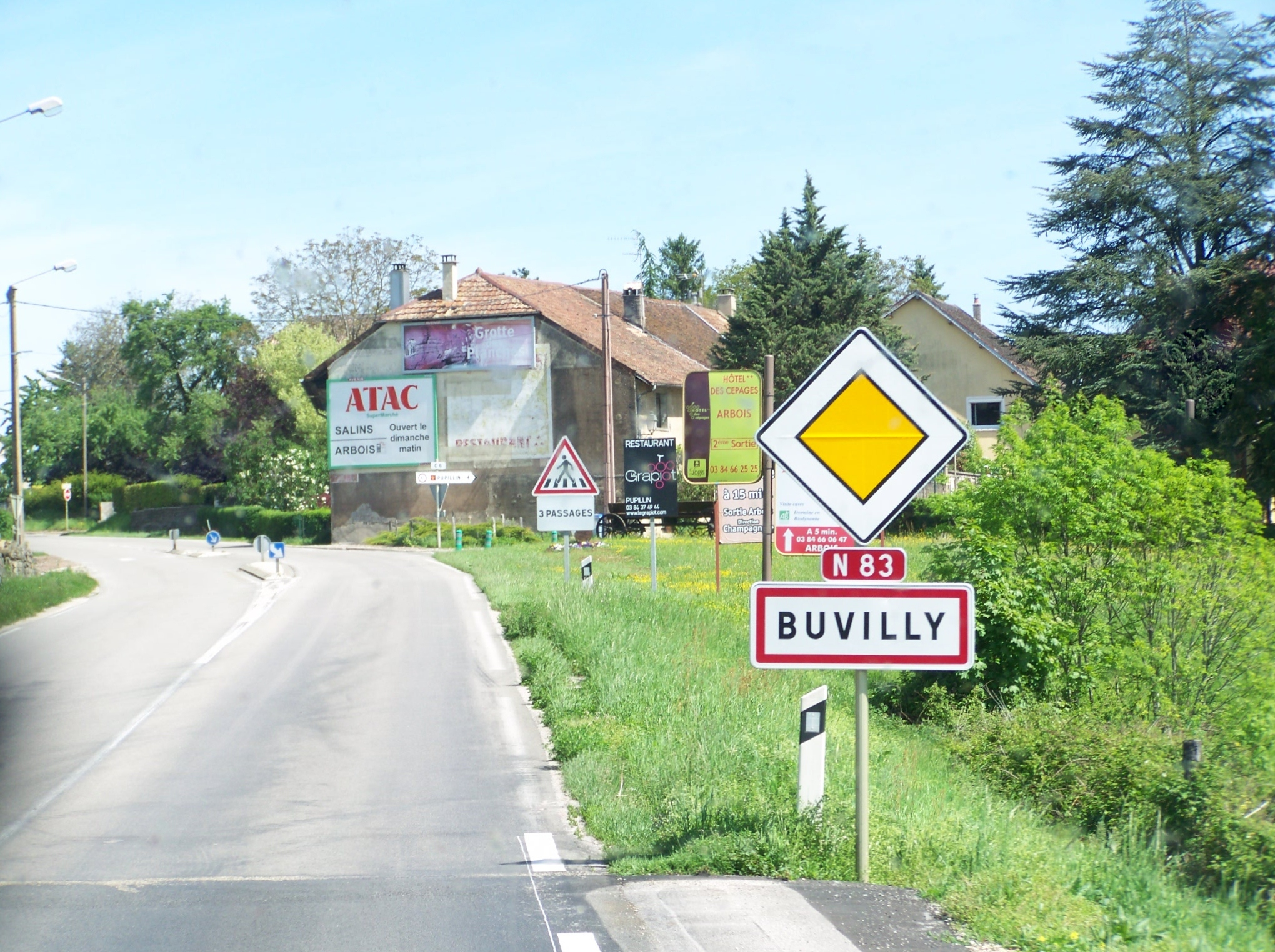
- The road into Buvilly

- Coat of arms
- Location of Buvilly
- Location within France Location within Bourgogne-Franche-Comté
- Coordinates: 46°52′08″N 5°43′13″E
- Country: France
- Region: Bourgogne-Franche-Comté
- Department: Jura
- Arrondissement: Dole
- Canton: Poligny

Government
  - Mayor (2020–2026): Florent Gaillard
- Area^{1}: 6.00 km^{2} (2.32 sq mi)
- Highest elevation: 575 m (1,886 ft)
- Lowest elevation: 290 m (950 ft)
- Population (2023): 383
  - Density: 63.8/km^{2} (165/sq mi)
- Time zone: UTC+01:00 (CET)
  - Summer (DST): UTC+02:00 (CEST)
- INSEE/Postal code: 39081 /39800
- ^{1} French Land Register data, which excludes lakes, ponds, glaciers > 1 km^{2} (0.386 sq mi or 247 acres) and river estuaries.

Buvilly is a commune in the Jura department in Bourgogne-Franche-Comté in eastern France.

== Population ==
Historical population
Year	Pop.	±% p.a.
1968	293	—
1975	294	+0.05%
1982	319	+1.17%
1990	359	+1.49%
1999	338	−0.67%
2007	357	+0.69%
2012	369	+0.66%
2017	385	+0.85%
2023	383	−0.09%
Source: INSEE

== See also ==
- Communes of the Jura department
