= Besain =

Commune in Bourgogne-Franche-Comté, France

- Commune
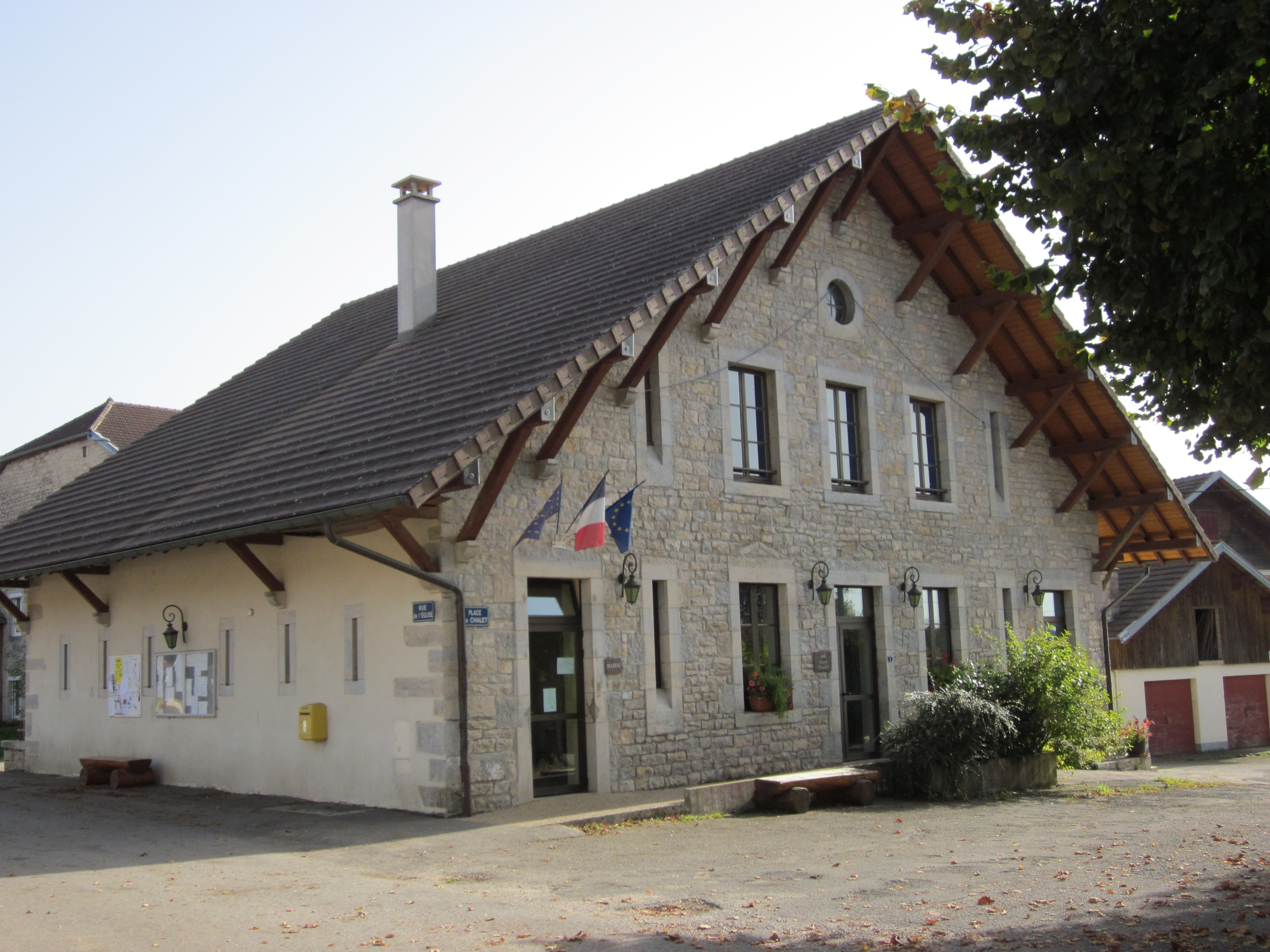
- The town hall in Besain
- Location of Besain
- Location within France Location within Bourgogne-Franche-Comté
- Coordinates: 46°47′11″N 5°47′41″E
- Country: France
- Region: Bourgogne-Franche-Comté
- Department: Jura
- Arrondissement: Dole
- Canton: Poligny

Government
  - Mayor (2020–2026): Serge Maire
- Area^{1}: 12.84 km^{2} (4.96 sq mi)
- Highest elevation: 640 m (2,100 ft)
- Lowest elevation: 514 m (1,686 ft)
- Population (2023): 159
  - Density: 12.4/km^{2} (32.1/sq mi)
- Time zone: UTC+01:00 (CET)
  - Summer (DST): UTC+02:00 (CEST)
- INSEE/Postal code: 39050 /39800
- ^{1} French Land Register data, which excludes lakes, ponds, glaciers > 1 km^{2} (0.386 sq mi or 247 acres) and river estuaries.

Besain (French pronunciation: [bəzɛ̃]; Arpitan: Bësain) is a commune in the Jura department in the region of Bourgogne-Franche-Comté in eastern France.

== Population ==
Historical population
| Year | Pop. | ±% p.a. |
|---|---|---|
| 1968 | 163 | — |
| 1975 | 146 | −1.56% |
| 1982 | 134 | −1.22% |
| 1990 | 146 | +1.08% |
| 1999 | 180 | +2.35% |
| 2007 | 169 | −0.79% |
| 2012 | 152 | −2.10% |
| 2017 | 161 | +1.16% |
| 2023 | 159 | −0.21% |
Source: INSEE

== Climate ==
On average, Besain experiences 116.4 days per year with a minimum temperature below 0 °C (32.0 °F), 11.2 days per year with a minimum temperature below −10 °C (14.0 °F), 9 days per year with a maximum temperature below 0 °C (32.0 °F), and 17.2 days per year with a maximum temperature above 30 °C (86.0 °F). The record high temperature was 39.5 °C (103.1 °F) on 25 July 2019, while the record low temperature was −33.0 °C (−27.4 °F) on 2 January 1971.

Climate data for Besain (1991–2020 normals, extremes 1959–2021)
| Month | Jan | Feb | Mar | Apr | May | Jun | Jul | Aug | Sep | Oct | Nov | Dec | Year |
|---|---|---|---|---|---|---|---|---|---|---|---|---|---|
| Record high °C (°F) | 17.5 (63.5) | 21.4 (70.5) | 25.5 (77.9) | 28.0 (82.4) | 33.0 (91.4) | 37.0 (98.6) | 39.5 (103.1) | 38.5 (101.3) | 33.0 (91.4) | 28.0 (82.4) | 22.6 (72.7) | 23.0 (73.4) | 39.5 (103.1) |
| Mean daily maximum °C (°F) | 5.9 (42.6) | 7.2 (45.0) | 11.5 (52.7) | 15.4 (59.7) | 19.5 (67.1) | 23.4 (74.1) | 25.7 (78.3) | 25.3 (77.5) | 20.7 (69.3) | 16.0 (60.8) | 10.1 (50.2) | 6.6 (43.9) | 15.6 (60.1) |
| Daily mean °C (°F) | 1.4 (34.5) | 2.0 (35.6) | 5.5 (41.9) | 8.7 (47.7) | 12.9 (55.2) | 16.5 (61.7) | 18.5 (65.3) | 18.2 (64.8) | 14.1 (57.4) | 10.3 (50.5) | 5.3 (41.5) | 2.2 (36.0) | 9.6 (49.3) |
| Mean daily minimum °C (°F) | −3.1 (26.4) | −3.1 (26.4) | −0.6 (30.9) | 2.0 (35.6) | 6.2 (43.2) | 9.6 (49.3) | 11.3 (52.3) | 11.0 (51.8) | 7.5 (45.5) | 4.6 (40.3) | 0.5 (32.9) | −2.2 (28.0) | 3.6 (38.6) |
| Record low °C (°F) | −33.0 (−27.4) | −22.1 (−7.8) | −23.5 (−10.3) | −9.5 (14.9) | −8.4 (16.9) | −1.5 (29.3) | 0.2 (32.4) | −0.2 (31.6) | −4.5 (23.9) | −9.0 (15.8) | −19.2 (−2.6) | −25.0 (−13.0) | −33.0 (−27.4) |
| Average precipitation mm (inches) | 132.8 (5.23) | 118.3 (4.66) | 119.9 (4.72) | 114.4 (4.50) | 139.5 (5.49) | 107.4 (4.23) | 104.4 (4.11) | 113.7 (4.48) | 116.5 (4.59) | 142.8 (5.62) | 159.0 (6.26) | 156.9 (6.18) | 1,525.6 (60.07) |
| Average precipitation days (≥ 1.0 mm) | 14.0 | 12.4 | 12.1 | 11.7 | 13.4 | 10.5 | 10.7 | 10.4 | 10.0 | 13.2 | 13.9 | 15.0 | 147.3 |
Source: Meteociel

== See also ==
- Communes of the Jura department
