= Miéry =

Commune in Bourgogne-Franche-Comté, France

- Commune
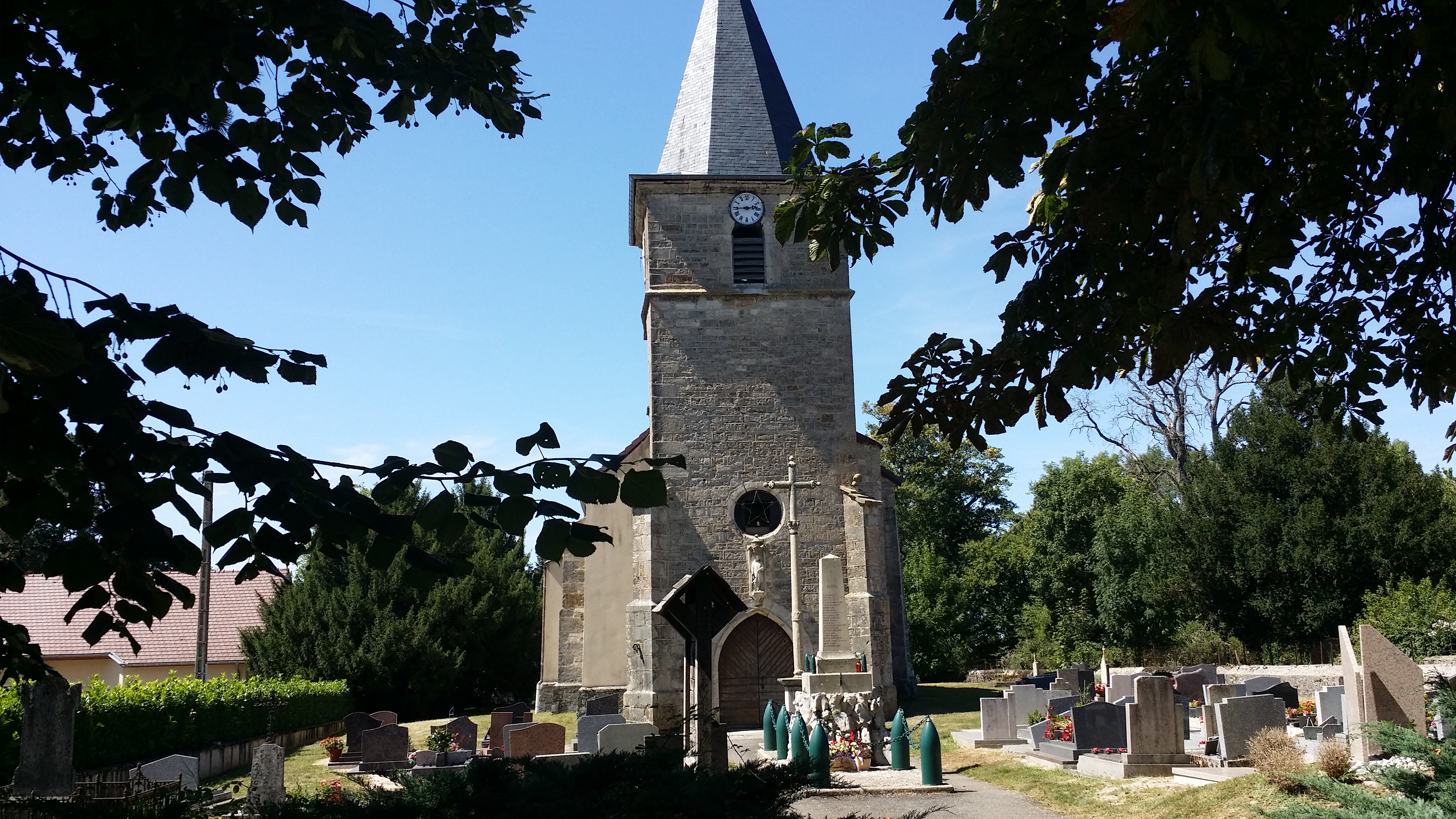
- The church in Miéry

- Coat of arms
- Location of Miéry
- Location within France Location within Bourgogne-Franche-Comté
- Coordinates: 46°48′48″N 5°40′31″E
- Country: France
- Region: Bourgogne-Franche-Comté
- Department: Jura
- Arrondissement: Dole
- Canton: Bletterans

Government
  - Mayor (2020–2026): Daniel Bertocchi
- Area^{1}: 7.67 km^{2} (2.96 sq mi)
- Highest elevation: 560 m (1,840 ft)
- Lowest elevation: 305 m (1,001 ft)
- Population (2023): 133
  - Density: 17.3/km^{2} (44.9/sq mi)
- Time zone: UTC+01:00 (CET)
  - Summer (DST): UTC+02:00 (CEST)
- INSEE/Postal code: 39330 /39800
- ^{1} French Land Register data, which excludes lakes, ponds, glaciers > 1 km^{2} (0.386 sq mi or 247 acres) and river estuaries.

Miéry (French pronunciation: [mjeʁi]) is a commune in the Jura department in Bourgogne-Franche-Comté in eastern France.

== Population ==
Historical population
Year	Pop.	±% p.a.
1968	154	—
1975	139	−1.45%
1982	113	−2.92%
1990	105	−0.91%
1999	104	−0.11%
2007	135	+3.31%
2012	154	+2.67%
2017	152	−0.26%
2023	133	−2.20%
Source: INSEE

== See also ==
- Communes of the Jura department
