= Picarreau =

Commune in Bourgogne-Franche-Comté, France

- Commune
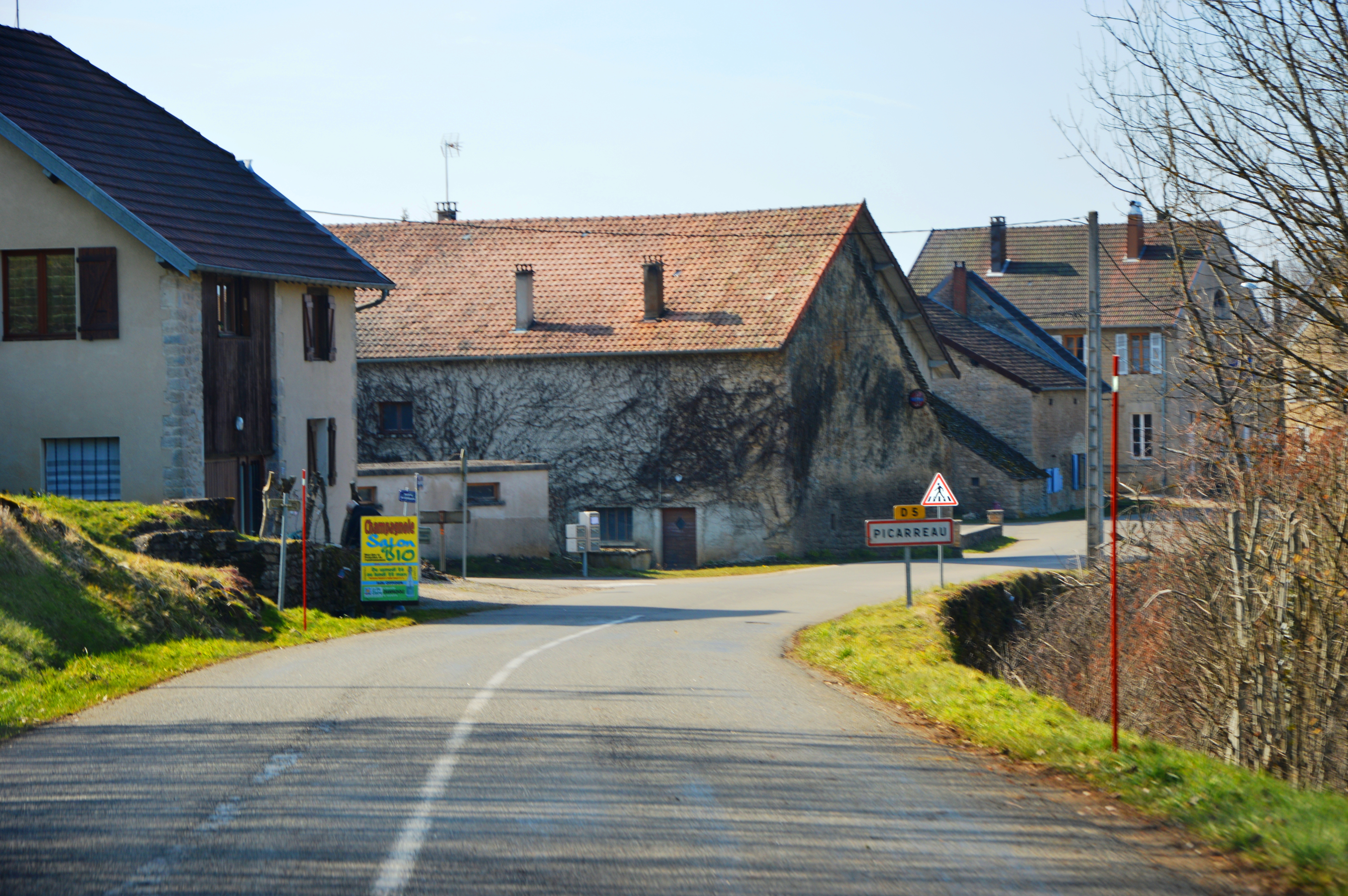
- The road into Picarreau

- Coat of arms
- Location of Picarreau
- Location within France Location within Bourgogne-Franche-Comté
- Coordinates: 46°45′16″N 5°44′45″E
- Country: France
- Region: Bourgogne-Franche-Comté
- Department: Jura
- Arrondissement: Dole
- Canton: Poligny

Government
  - Mayor (2020–2026): Dominique Pellin
- Area^{1}: 8.96 km^{2} (3.46 sq mi)
- Highest elevation: 628 m (2,060 ft)
- Lowest elevation: 530 m (1,740 ft)
- Population (2023): 98
  - Density: 11/km^{2} (28/sq mi)
- Time zone: UTC+01:00 (CET)
  - Summer (DST): UTC+02:00 (CEST)
- INSEE/Postal code: 39418 /39800
- ^{1} French Land Register data, which excludes lakes, ponds, glaciers > 1 km^{2} (0.386 sq mi or 247 acres) and river estuaries.

Picarreau (French pronunciation: [pikaʁo]; Arpitan: Picarriâ) is a commune in the Jura department in Bourgogne-Franche-Comté in eastern France.

== Population ==
Historical population
Year	Pop.	±% p.a.
1968	105	—
1975	93	−1.72%
1982	84	−1.44%
1990	81	−0.45%
1999	87	+0.80%
2007	85	−0.29%
2012	98	+2.89%
2017	101	+0.60%
2023	98	−0.50%
Source: INSEE

== See also ==
- Communes of the Jura department
