= Le Louverot =

Commune in Bourgogne-Franche-Comté, France

- Commune
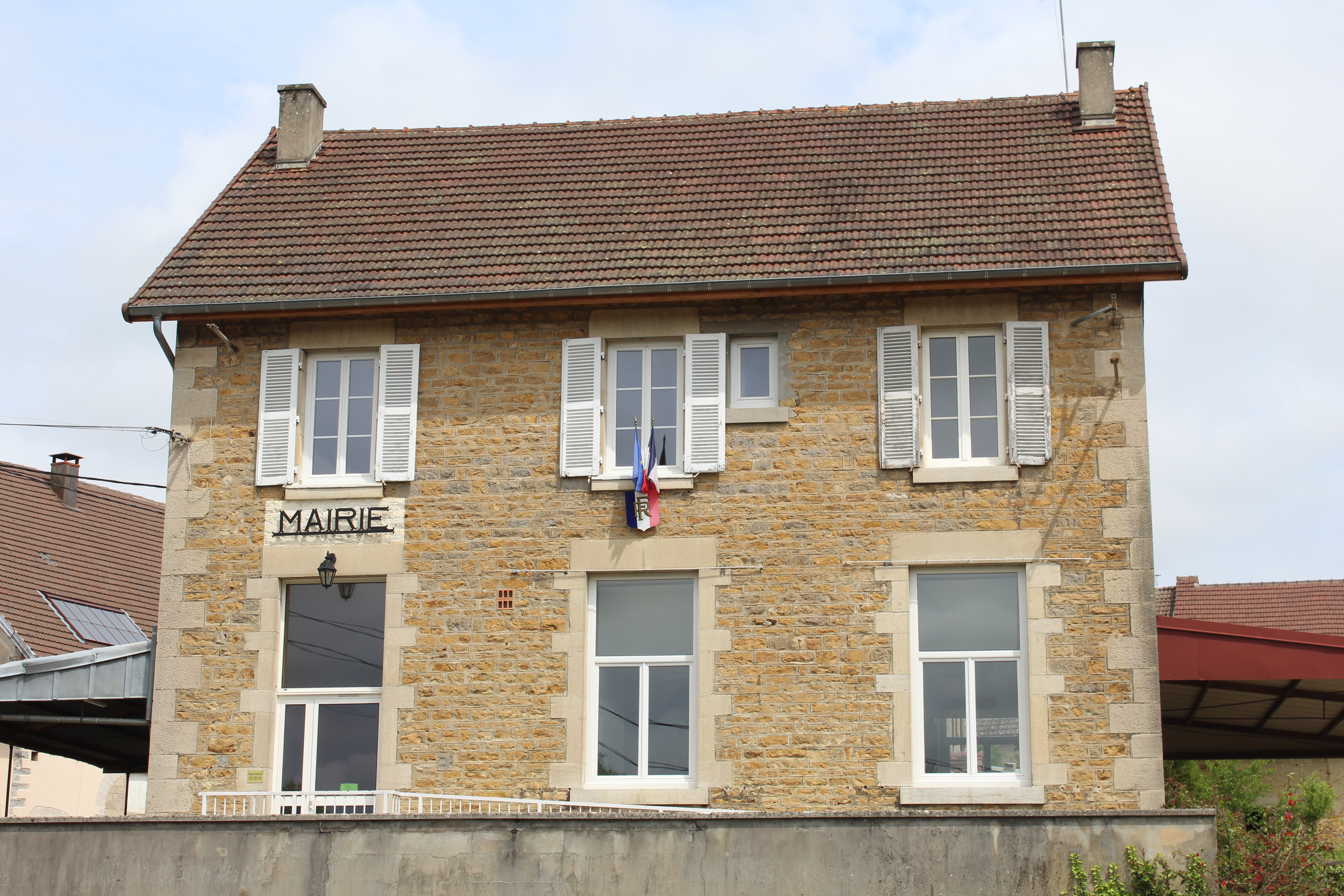
- The town hall in Le Louverot

- Coat of arms
- Location of Le Louverot
- Location within France Location within Bourgogne-Franche-Comté
- Coordinates: 46°43′52″N 5°35′05″E
- Country: France
- Region: Bourgogne-Franche-Comté
- Department: Jura
- Arrondissement: Lons-le-Saunier
- Canton: Poligny

Government
  - Mayor (2020–2026): Michel Gris
- Area^{1}: 1.74 km^{2} (0.67 sq mi)
- Highest elevation: 340 m (1,120 ft)
- Lowest elevation: 250 m (820 ft)
- Population (2023): 234
  - Density: 134/km^{2} (348/sq mi)
- Time zone: UTC+01:00 (CET)
  - Summer (DST): UTC+02:00 (CEST)
- INSEE/Postal code: 39304 /39210
- ^{1} French Land Register data, which excludes lakes, ponds, glaciers > 1 km^{2} (0.386 sq mi or 247 acres) and river estuaries.

Le Louverot (French pronunciation: [lə luvʁo]) is a commune in the Jura department in Bourgogne-Franche-Comté in eastern France.

== Population ==
Historical population
Year	Pop.	±% p.a.
1968	91	—
1975	110	+2.75%
1982	156	+5.12%
1990	256	+6.39%
1999	313	+2.26%
2007	270	−1.83%
2012	243	−2.09%
2017	211	−2.78%
2023	234	+1.74%
Source: INSEE

== See also ==
- Communes of the Jura department
