= Montain =

Commune in Bourgogne-Franche-Comté, France

- Commune
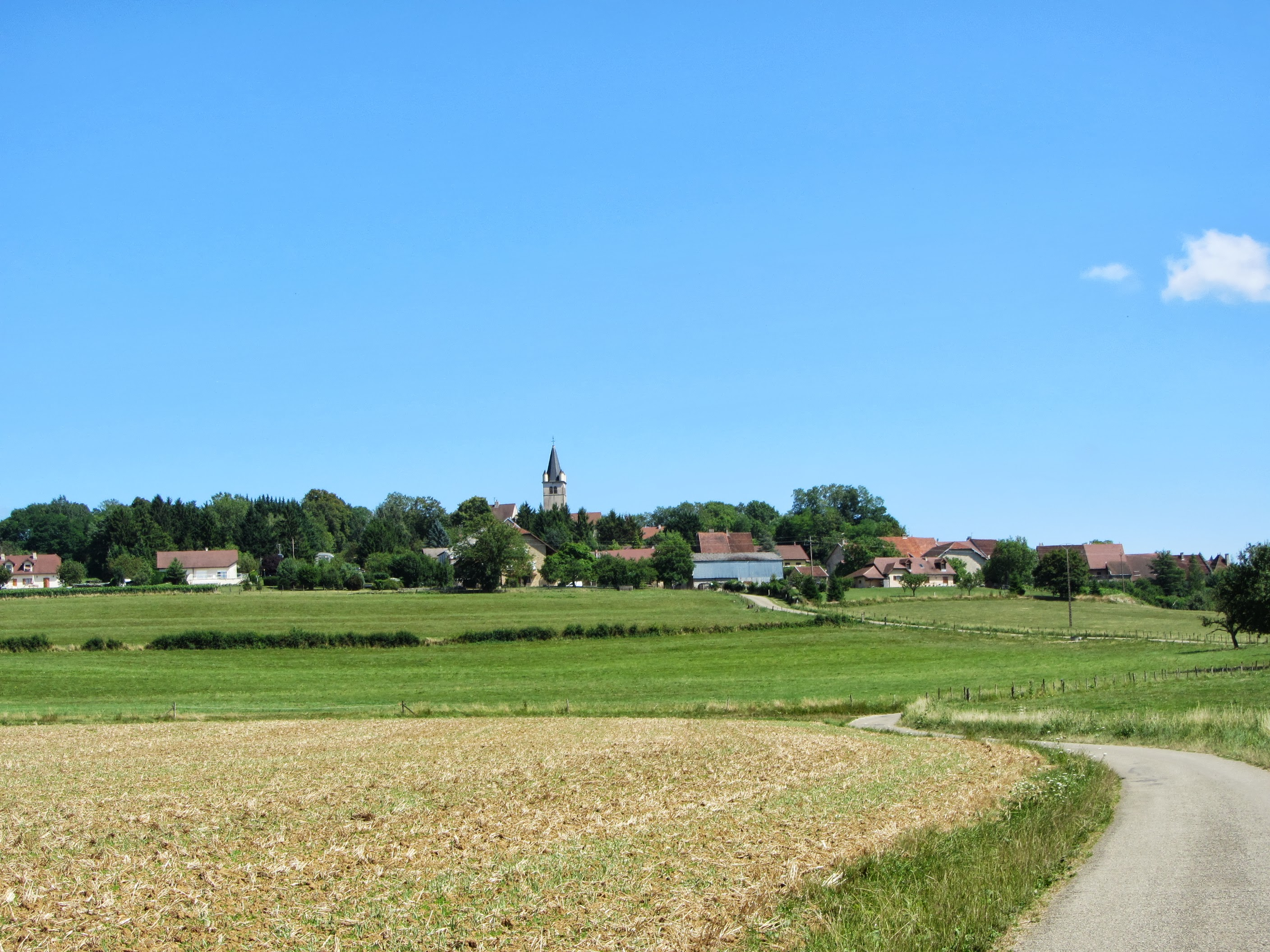
- A general view of Montain
- Location of Montain
- Location within France Location within Bourgogne-Franche-Comté
- Coordinates: 46°43′15″N 5°34′48″E
- Country: France
- Region: Bourgogne-Franche-Comté
- Department: Jura
- Arrondissement: Lons-le-Saunier
- Canton: Poligny

Government
  - Mayor (2020–2026): Marie Odile Mainguet
- Area^{1}: 2.29 km^{2} (0.88 sq mi)
- Highest elevation: 380 m (1,250 ft)
- Lowest elevation: 284 m (932 ft)
- Population (2023): 484
  - Density: 211/km^{2} (547/sq mi)
- Time zone: UTC+01:00 (CET)
  - Summer (DST): UTC+02:00 (CEST)
- INSEE/Postal code: 39349 /39210
- ^{1} French Land Register data, which excludes lakes, ponds, glaciers > 1 km^{2} (0.386 sq mi or 247 acres) and river estuaries.

Montain (French pronunciation: [mɔ̃tɛ̃]) is a commune in the Jura department in Bourgogne-Franche-Comté in eastern France.

== See also ==
- Communes of the Jura department
