= Saint-Maur, Jura =

Commune in Bourgogne-Franche-Comté, France

Saint-Maur
- Commune
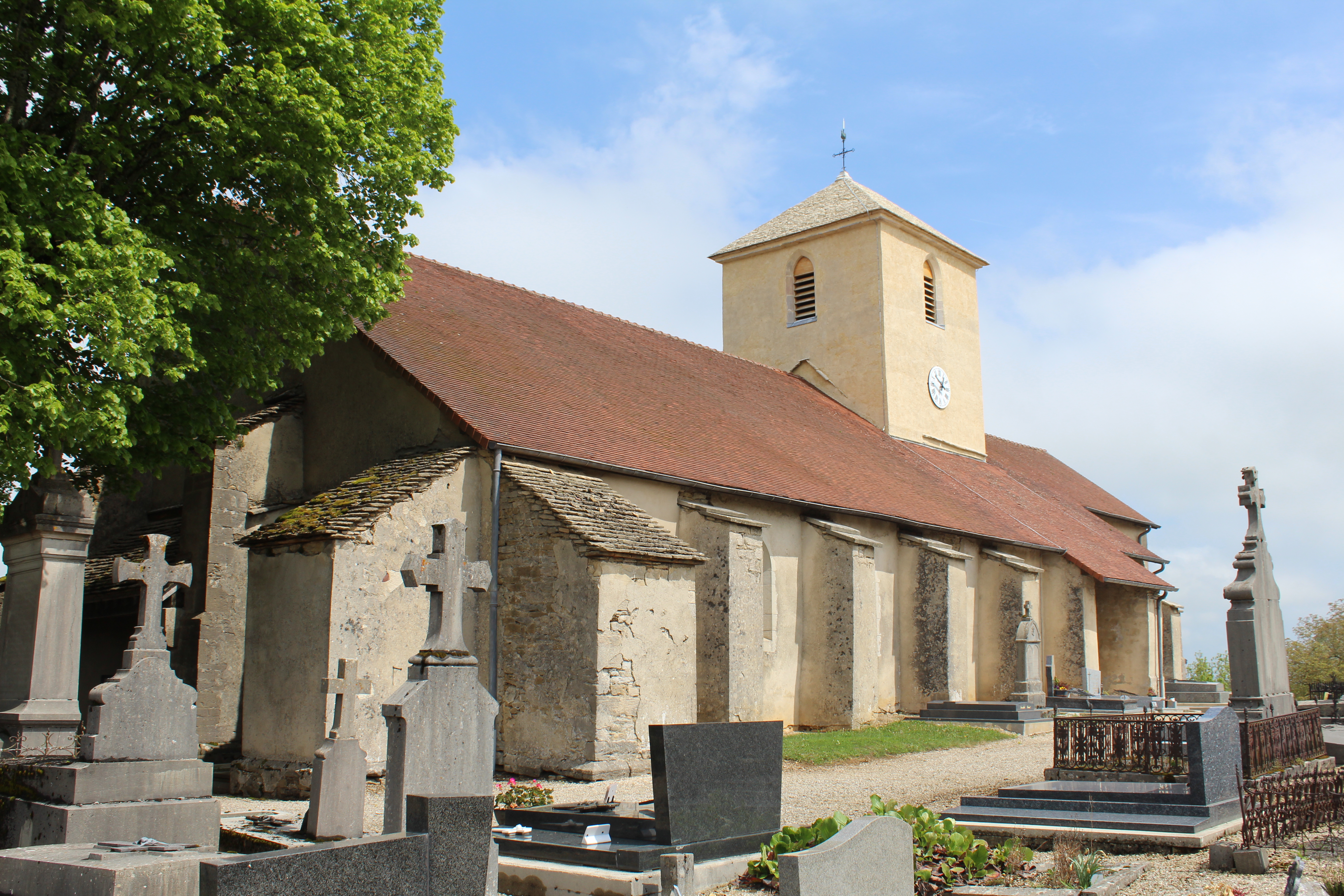
- The church in Saint-Maur
- Location of Saint-Maur
- Location within France Location within Bourgogne-Franche-Comté
- Coordinates: 46°36′56″N 5°35′26″E
- Country: France
- Region: Bourgogne-Franche-Comté
- Department: Jura
- Arrondissement: Lons-le-Saunier
- Canton: Poligny

Government
  - Mayor (2020–2026): Gaëtan Aymonier
- Area^{1}: 6.50 km^{2} (2.51 sq mi)
- Highest elevation: 643 m (2,110 ft)
- Lowest elevation: 525 m (1,722 ft)
- Population (2023): 212
  - Density: 32.6/km^{2} (84.5/sq mi)
- Time zone: UTC+01:00 (CET)
  - Summer (DST): UTC+02:00 (CEST)
- INSEE/Postal code: 39492 /39570
- ^{1} French Land Register data, which excludes lakes, ponds, glaciers > 1 km^{2} (0.386 sq mi or 247 acres) and river estuaries.

Saint-Maur (French pronunciation: [sɛ̃ mɔʁ]) is a commune in the Jura department in the Bourgogne-Franche-Comté region in eastern France.

== Population ==
Historical population
Year	Pop.	±% p.a.
1968	168	—
1975	137	−2.87%
1982	194	+5.10%
1990	194	+0.00%
1999	168	−1.59%
2007	195	+1.88%
2012	224	+2.81%
2017	233	+0.79%
2023	212	−1.56%
Source: INSEE

== See also ==
- Communes of the Jura department
