= Menétru-le-Vignoble =

Commune in Bourgogne-Franche-Comté, France

- Commune
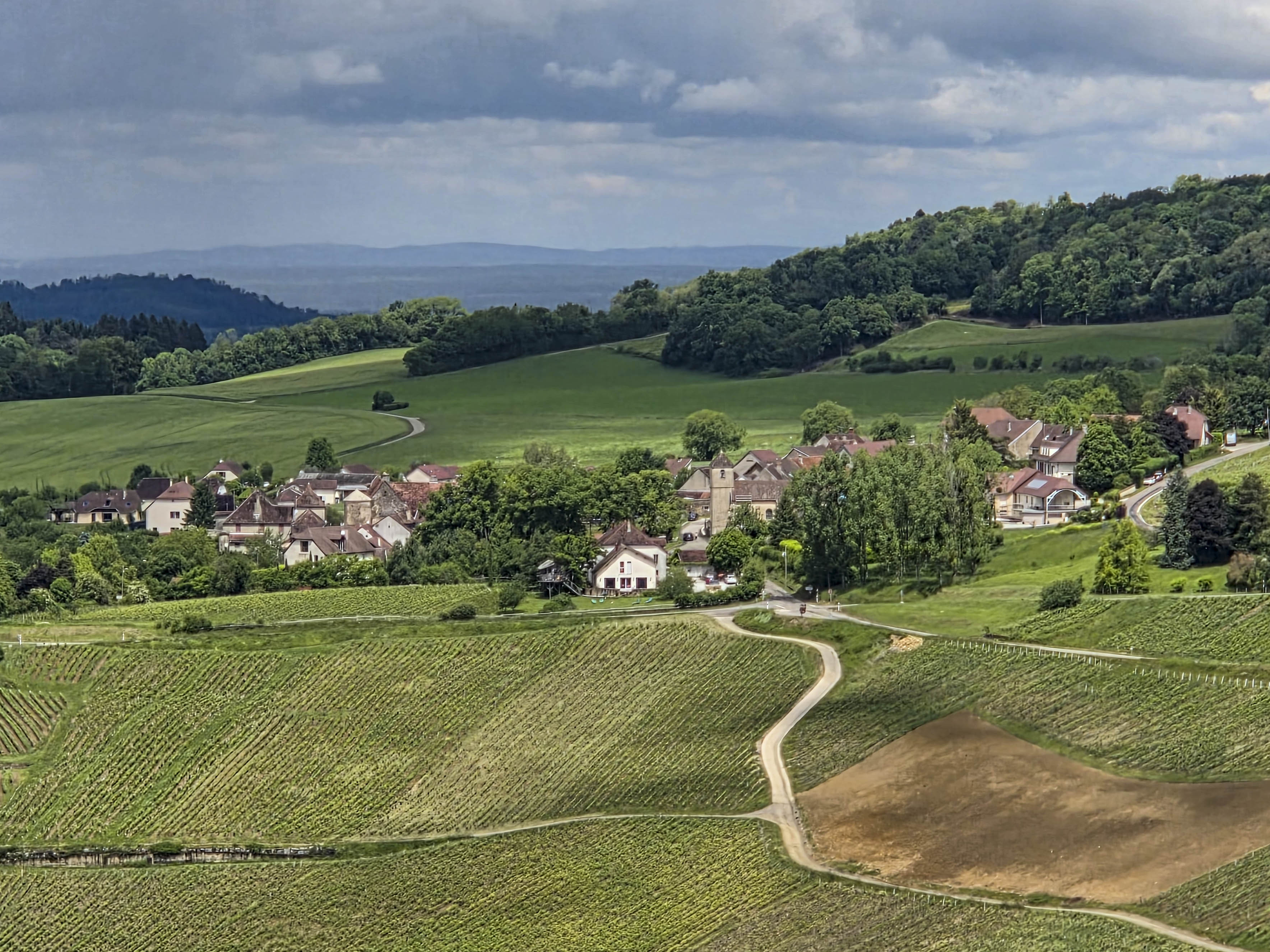
- A general view of Menétru-le-Vignoble

- Coat of arms
- Location of Menétru-le-Vignoble
- Location within France Location within Bourgogne-Franche-Comté
- Coordinates: 46°46′09″N 5°37′20″E
- Country: France
- Region: Bourgogne-Franche-Comté
- Department: Jura
- Arrondissement: Lons-le-Saunier
- Canton: Poligny

Government
  - Mayor (2023–2026): Pascal Outhier
- Area^{1}: 5.88 km^{2} (2.27 sq mi)
- Highest elevation: 550 m (1,800 ft)
- Lowest elevation: 267 m (876 ft)
- Population (2023): 164
  - Density: 27.9/km^{2} (72.2/sq mi)
- Time zone: UTC+01:00 (CET)
  - Summer (DST): UTC+02:00 (CEST)
- INSEE/Postal code: 39321 /39210
- ^{1} French Land Register data, which excludes lakes, ponds, glaciers > 1 km^{2} (0.386 sq mi or 247 acres) and river estuaries.

Menétru-le-Vignoble (French pronunciation: [mənetʁy lə viɲɔbl]) is a commune in the Jura department in Bourgogne-Franche-Comté in eastern France. Part of the Route des Vins. The area is known for its cultivation of the Savagnin grape, which is used in the renowned Château-Chalon appellation wines.

The commune has a population of around 160 residents. Menétru-le-Vignoble attracts hikers with its trails that offer views stretching towards the foothills of Burgundy.

== Population ==
Historical population
| Year | Pop. | ±% p.a. |
|---|---|---|
| 1968 | 151 | — |
| 1975 | 127 | −2.44% |
| 1982 | 125 | −0.23% |
| 1990 | 138 | +1.24% |
| 1999 | 138 | +0.00% |
| 2007 | 151 | +1.13% |
| 2012 | 152 | +0.13% |
| 2017 | 159 | +0.90% |
| 2023 | 164 | +0.52% |
Source: INSEE

== See also ==
- Communes of the Jura department
