= Chamole =

Commune in Bourgogne-Franche-Comté, France

- Commune
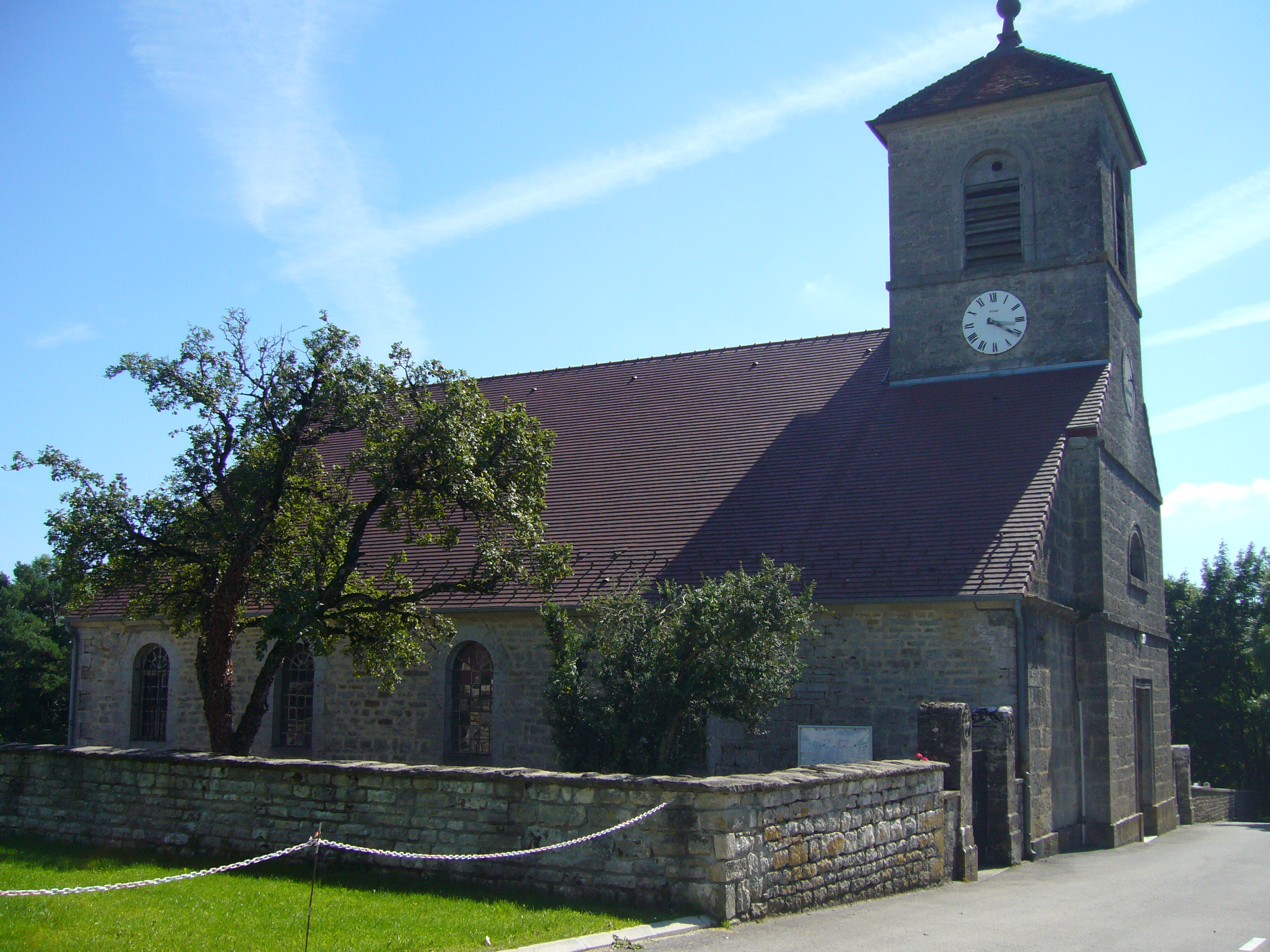
- The church in Chamole

- Coat of arms
- Location of Chamole
- Location within France Location within Bourgogne-Franche-Comté
- Coordinates: 46°50′23″N 5°43′38″E
- Country: France
- Region: Bourgogne-Franche-Comté
- Department: Jura
- Arrondissement: Dole
- Canton: Poligny

Government
  - Mayor (2020–2026): Denis Delbroucq
- Area^{1}: 5.78 km^{2} (2.23 sq mi)
- Highest elevation: 606 m (1,988 ft)
- Lowest elevation: 450 m (1,480 ft)
- Population (2023): 161
  - Density: 27.9/km^{2} (72.1/sq mi)
- Time zone: UTC+01:00 (CET)
  - Summer (DST): UTC+02:00 (CEST)
- INSEE/Postal code: 39094 /39800
- ^{1} French Land Register data, which excludes lakes, ponds, glaciers > 1 km^{2} (0.386 sq mi or 247 acres) and river estuaries.

Chamole (French pronunciation: [ʃamɔl]; Arpitan: Tsameula) is a commune in the Jura department in Bourgogne-Franche-Comté in eastern France.

== Population ==
Historical population
Year	Pop.	±% p.a.
1968	125	—
1975	122	−0.35%
1982	119	−0.36%
1990	119	+0.00%
1999	137	+1.58%
2007	159	+1.88%
2012	171	+1.47%
2017	166	−0.59%
2023	161	−0.51%
Source: INSEE

== See also ==
- Communes of the Jura department
