= Plainoiseau =

Commune in Bourgogne-Franche-Comté, France

- Commune
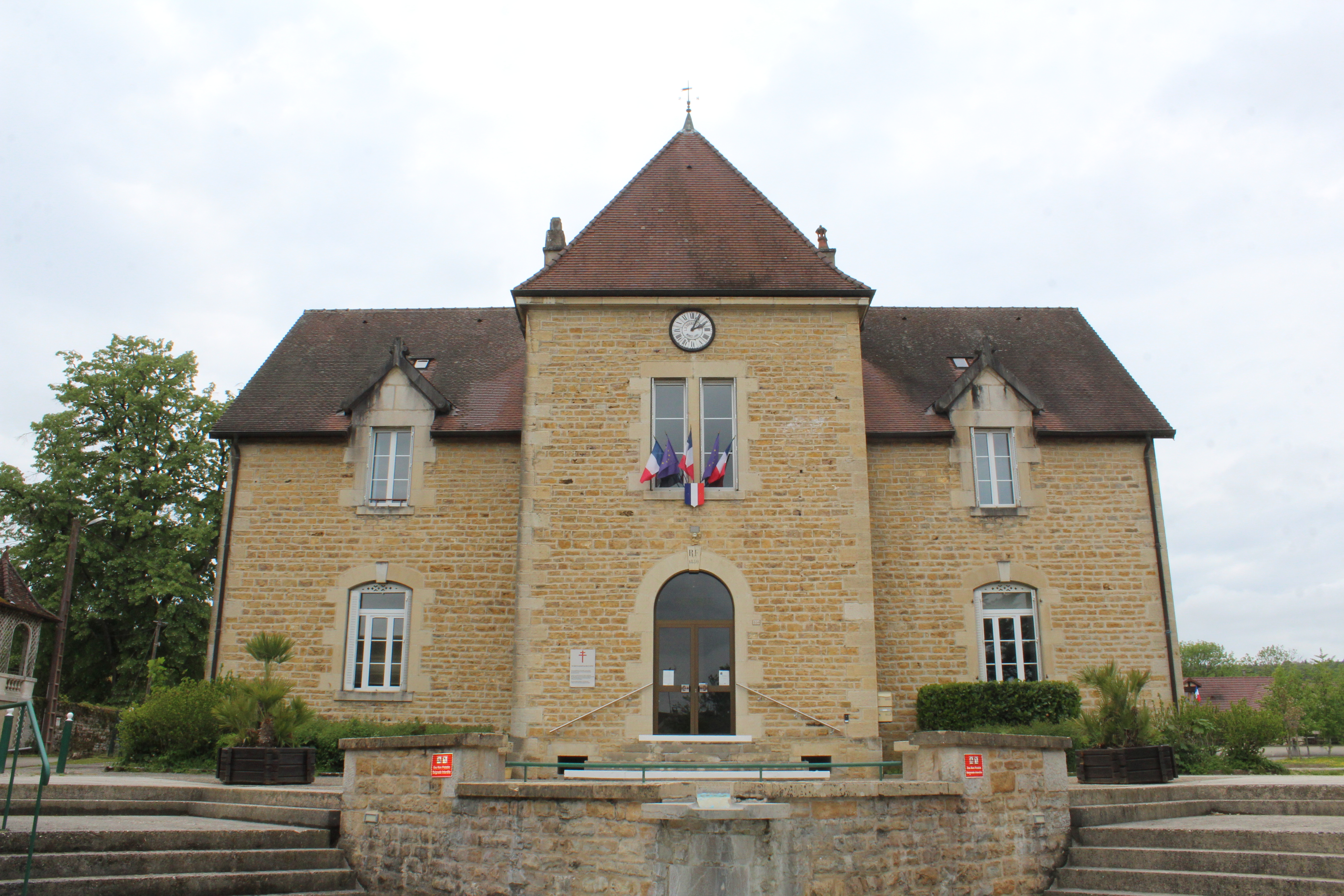
- The town hall in Plainoiseau
- Location of Plainoiseau
- Location within France Location within Bourgogne-Franche-Comté
- Coordinates: 46°43′52″N 5°33′20″E
- Country: France
- Region: Bourgogne-Franche-Comté
- Department: Jura
- Arrondissement: Lons-le-Saunier
- Canton: Poligny

Government
  - Mayor (2020–2026): Daniel Bondier
- Area^{1}: 5.38 km^{2} (2.08 sq mi)
- Highest elevation: 424 m (1,391 ft)
- Lowest elevation: 253 m (830 ft)
- Population (2023): 502
  - Density: 93.3/km^{2} (242/sq mi)
- Time zone: UTC+01:00 (CET)
  - Summer (DST): UTC+02:00 (CEST)
- INSEE/Postal code: 39422 /39210
- ^{1} French Land Register data, which excludes lakes, ponds, glaciers > 1 km^{2} (0.386 sq mi or 247 acres) and river estuaries.

Plainoiseau (French pronunciation: [plɛnwazo]) is a commune in the Jura department in Bourgogne-Franche-Comté in eastern France.

== Population ==
Historical population
Year	Pop.	±% p.a.
1968	231	—
1975	328	+5.14%
1982	384	+2.28%
1990	461	+2.31%
1999	508	+1.08%
2007	530	+0.53%
2012	556	+0.96%
2017	528	−1.03%
2023	502	−0.84%
Source: INSEE

== See also ==
- L'Étoile AOC
- Communes of the Jura department
