= Le Fied =

Commune in Bourgogne-Franche-Comté, France

- Commune
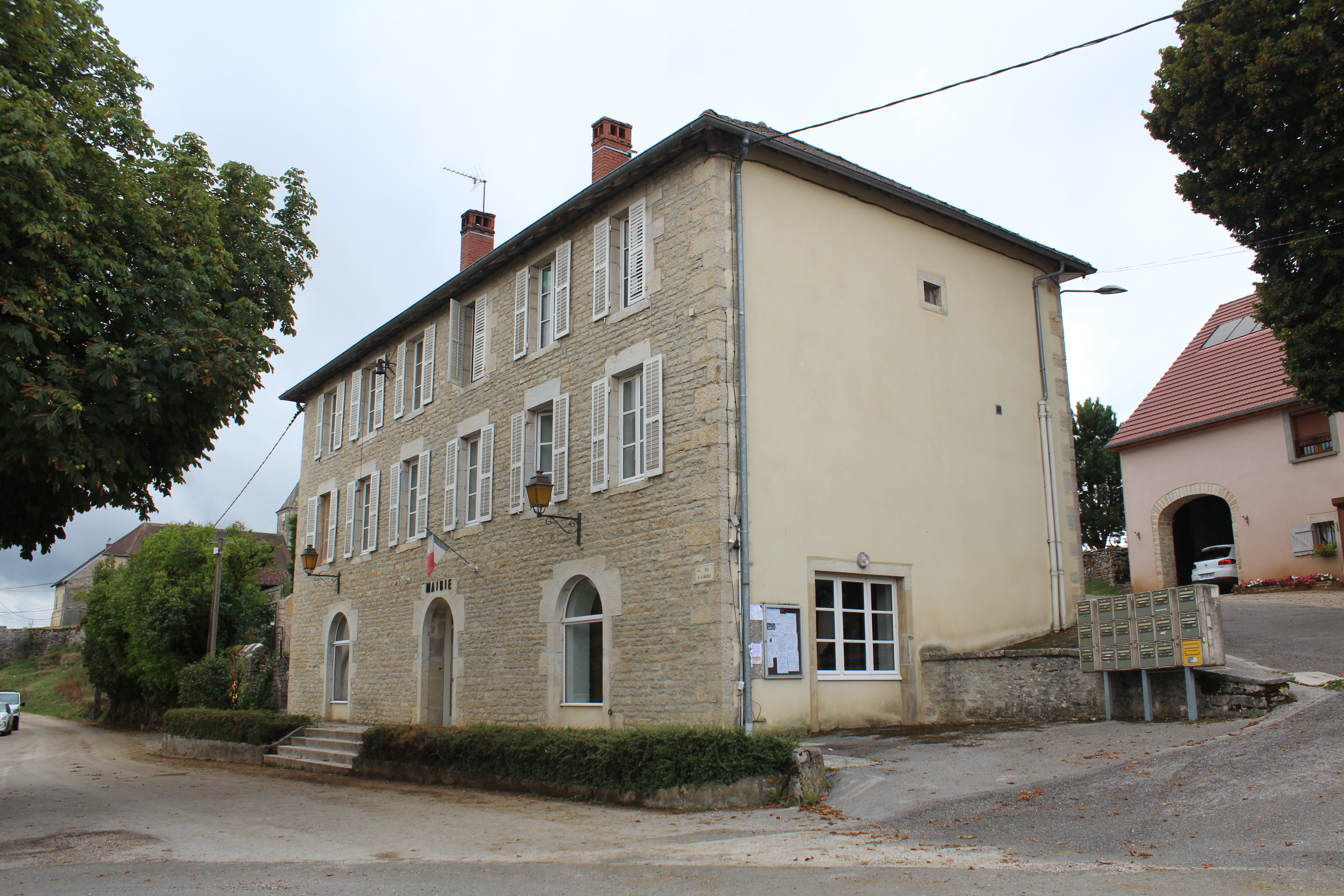
- The town hall in Le Fied
- Location of Le Fied
- Location within France Location within Bourgogne-Franche-Comté
- Coordinates: 46°46′17″N 5°43′03″E
- Country: France
- Region: Bourgogne-Franche-Comté
- Department: Jura
- Arrondissement: Dole
- Canton: Poligny

Government
  - Mayor (2020–2026): Michel Fèvre
- Area^{1}: 8.39 km^{2} (3.24 sq mi)
- Highest elevation: 562 m (1,844 ft)
- Lowest elevation: 520 m (1,710 ft)
- Population (2023): 186
  - Density: 22.2/km^{2} (57.4/sq mi)
- Time zone: UTC+01:00 (CET)
  - Summer (DST): UTC+02:00 (CEST)
- INSEE/Postal code: 39225 /39800
- ^{1} French Land Register data, which excludes lakes, ponds, glaciers > 1 km^{2} (0.386 sq mi or 247 acres) and river estuaries.

Le Fied (French pronunciation: [lə fje]; Arpitan: Lou Fied) is a commune in the Jura department in Bourgogne-Franche-Comté in eastern France.

== Population ==
Historical population
Year	Pop.	±% p.a.
1968	165	—
1975	152	−1.17%
1982	158	+0.55%
1990	147	−0.90%
1999	180	+2.28%
2007	206	+1.70%
2012	195	−1.09%
2017	204	+0.91%
2023	186	−1.53%
Source: INSEE

== See also ==
- Communes of the Jura department
