= Pannessières =

Commune in Bourgogne-Franche-Comté, France

- Commune
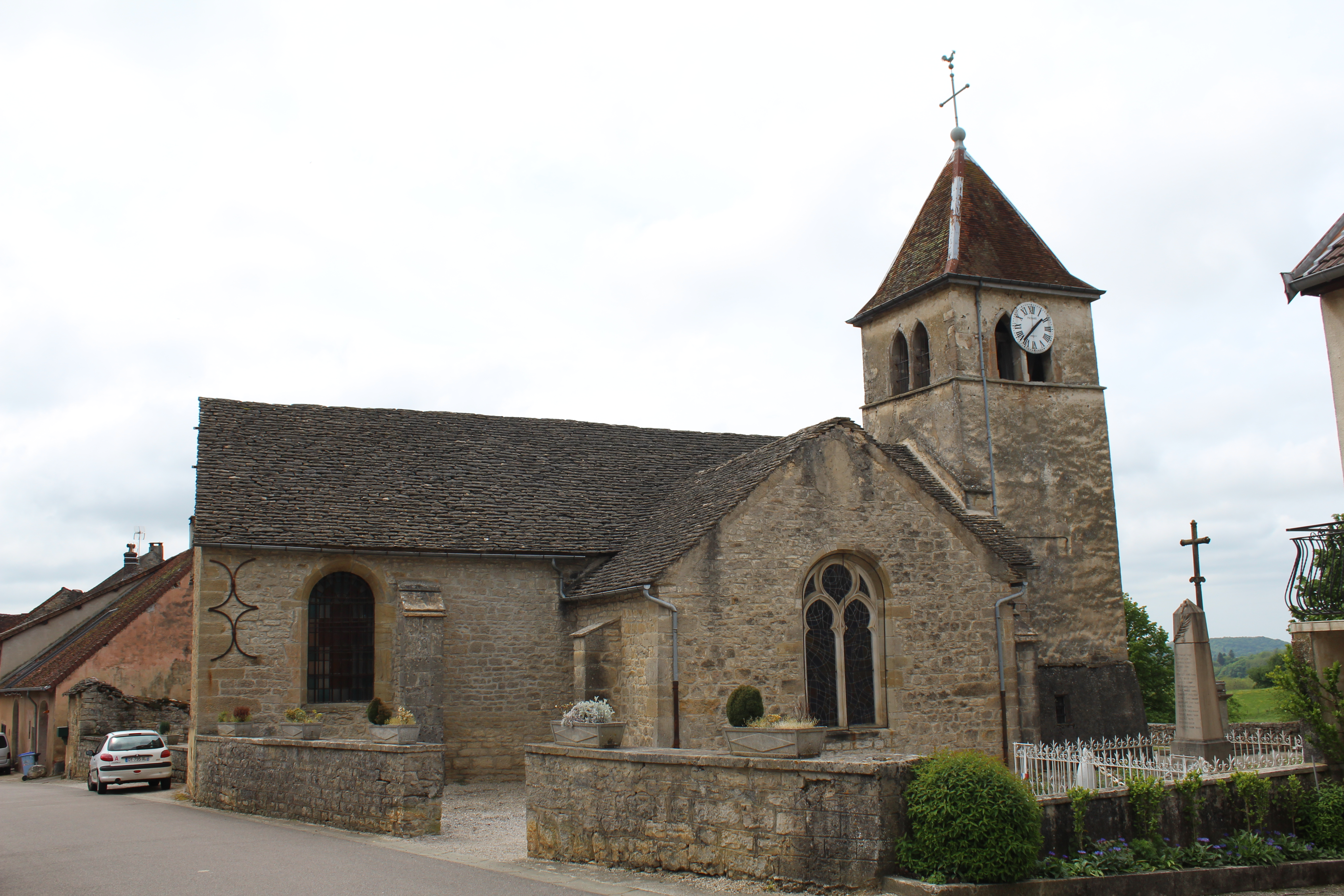
- The church in Pannessières

- Coat of arms
- Location of Pannessières
- Location within France Location within Bourgogne-Franche-Comté
- Coordinates: 46°41′55″N 5°35′56″E
- Country: France
- Region: Bourgogne-Franche-Comté
- Department: Jura
- Arrondissement: Lons-le-Saunier
- Canton: Poligny
- Intercommunality: Espace Communautaire Lons Agglomération

Government
  - Mayor (2026–32): Anne Lambermont-Ford
- Area^{1}: 5.35 km^{2} (2.07 sq mi)
- Highest elevation: 527 m (1,729 ft)
- Lowest elevation: 280 m (920 ft)
- Population (2023): 444
  - Density: 83.0/km^{2} (215/sq mi)
- Time zone: UTC+01:00 (CET)
  - Summer (DST): UTC+02:00 (CEST)
- INSEE/Postal code: 39404 /39570
- ^{1} French Land Register data, which excludes lakes, ponds, glaciers > 1 km^{2} (0.386 sq mi or 247 acres) and river estuaries.

Pannessières (French pronunciation: [pansjɛʁ]; Arpitan: Pennessirës) is a commune in the Jura department in Bourgogne-Franche-Comté in eastern France.

== Population ==
Historical population
| Year | Pop. | ±% p.a. |
|---|---|---|
| 1968 | 433 | — |
| 1975 | 408 | −0.85% |
| 1982 | 479 | +2.32% |
| 1990 | 505 | +0.66% |
| 1999 | 465 | −0.91% |
| 2007 | 443 | −0.60% |
| 2012 | 455 | +0.54% |
| 2017 | 483 | +1.20% |
| 2023 | 444 | −1.39% |
Source: INSEE

== See also ==
- Communes of the Jura department
