= Blye =

Commune in Bourgogne-Franche-Comté, France

- Commune
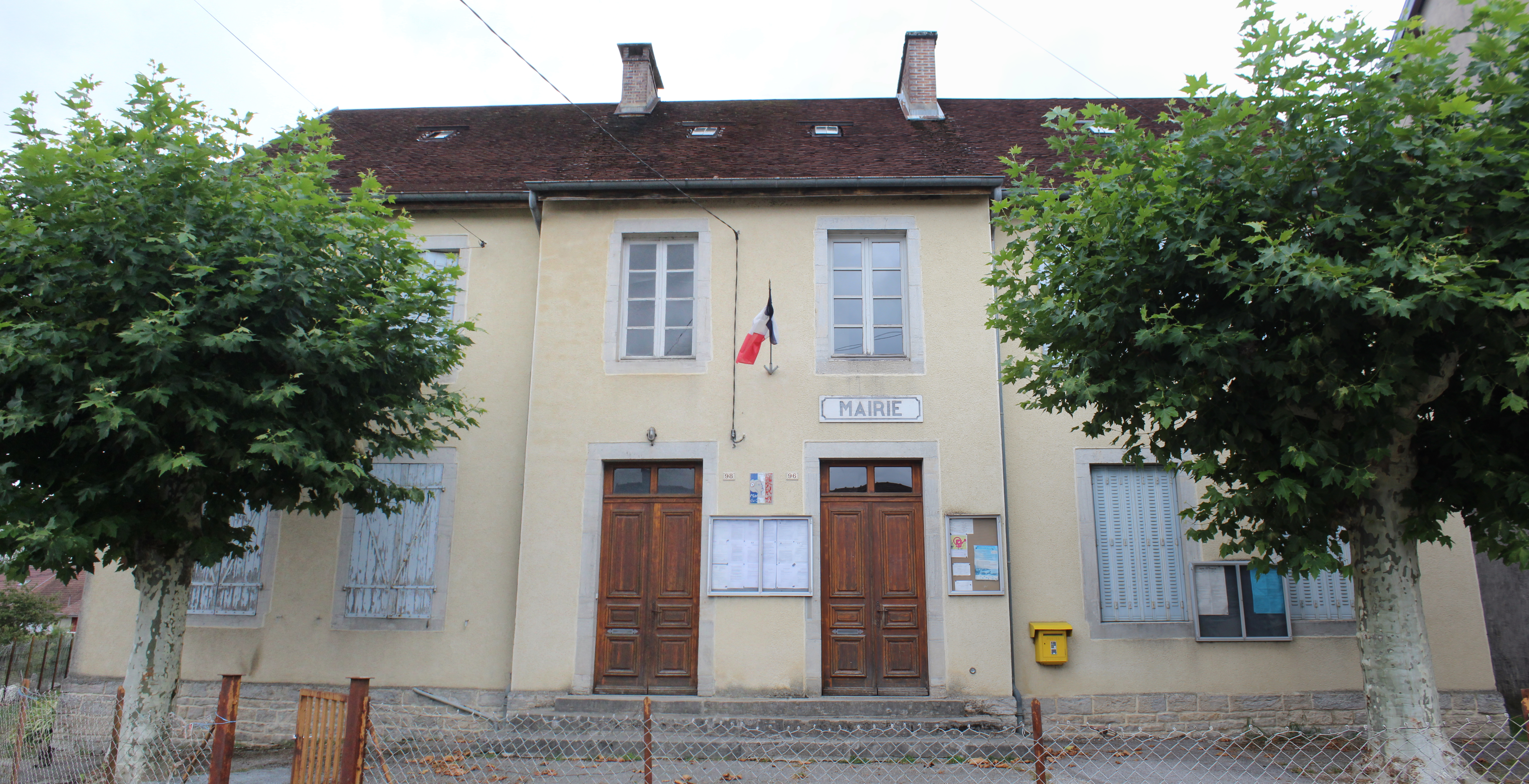
- The town hall in Blye
- Location of Blye
- Location within France Location within Bourgogne-Franche-Comté
- Coordinates: 46°37′23″N 5°42′15″E
- Country: France
- Region: Bourgogne-Franche-Comté
- Department: Jura
- Arrondissement: Lons-le-Saunier
- Canton: Poligny

Government
  - Mayor (2025–2026): Jean-Charles Bouillier
- Area^{1}: 10.76 km^{2} (4.15 sq mi)
- Highest elevation: 590 m (1,940 ft)
- Lowest elevation: 436 m (1,430 ft)
- Population (2023): 143
  - Density: 13.3/km^{2} (34.4/sq mi)
- Time zone: UTC+01:00 (CET)
  - Summer (DST): UTC+02:00 (CEST)
- INSEE/Postal code: 39058 /39130
- ^{1} French Land Register data, which excludes lakes, ponds, glaciers > 1 km^{2} (0.386 sq mi or 247 acres) and river estuaries.

Blye (French pronunciation: [bli]) is a commune in the Jura department in Bourgogne-Franche-Comté in eastern France.

== Population ==
Historical population
| Year | Pop. | ±% p.a. |
|---|---|---|
| 1968 | 137 | — |
| 1975 | 118 | −2.11% |
| 1982 | 122 | +0.48% |
| 1990 | 110 | −1.29% |
| 1999 | 117 | +0.69% |
| 2007 | 145 | +2.72% |
| 2012 | 163 | +2.37% |
| 2017 | 162 | −0.12% |
| 2023 | 143 | −2.06% |
Source: INSEE

== See also ==
- Communes of the Jura department
