= Fay-en-Montagne =

Commune in Bourgogne-Franche-Comté, France

- Commune
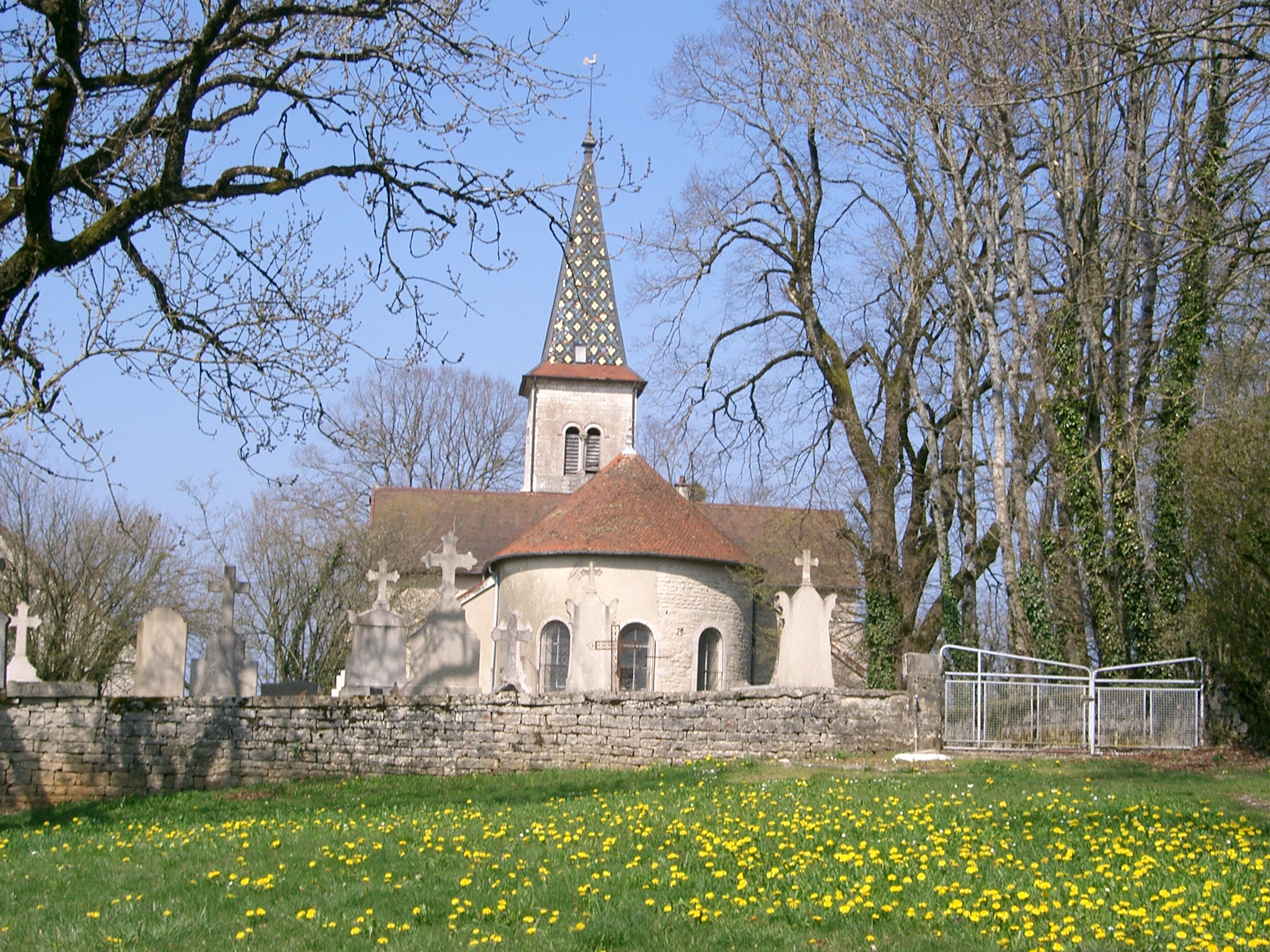
- The church in Fay-en-Montagne

- Coat of arms
- Location of Fay-en-Montagne
- Location within France Location within Bourgogne-Franche-Comté
- Coordinates: 46°45′10″N 5°43′33″E
- Country: France
- Region: Bourgogne-Franche-Comté
- Department: Jura
- Arrondissement: Dole
- Canton: Poligny

Government
  - Mayor (2020–2026): Laurent Perrard
- Area^{1}: 6.26 km^{2} (2.42 sq mi)
- Highest elevation: 567 m (1,860 ft)
- Lowest elevation: 519 m (1,703 ft)
- Population (2023): 90
  - Density: 14/km^{2} (37/sq mi)
- Time zone: UTC+01:00 (CET)
  - Summer (DST): UTC+02:00 (CEST)
- INSEE/Postal code: 39222 /39800
- ^{1} French Land Register data, which excludes lakes, ponds, glaciers > 1 km^{2} (0.386 sq mi or 247 acres) and river estuaries.

Fay-en-Montagne (French pronunciation: [fɛ ɑ̃ mɔ̃taɲ]) is a commune in the Jura department in Bourgogne-Franche-Comté in eastern France.

== Population ==
Historical population
Year	Pop.	±% p.a.
1968	114	—
1975	90	−3.32%
1982	85	−0.81%
1990	76	−1.39%
1999	83	+0.98%
2007	74	−1.42%
2012	82	+2.07%
2017	85	+0.72%
2023	90	+0.96%
Source: INSEE

== See also ==
- Communes of the Jura department
