= Nogna =

Commune in Bourgogne-Franche-Comté, France

- Commune
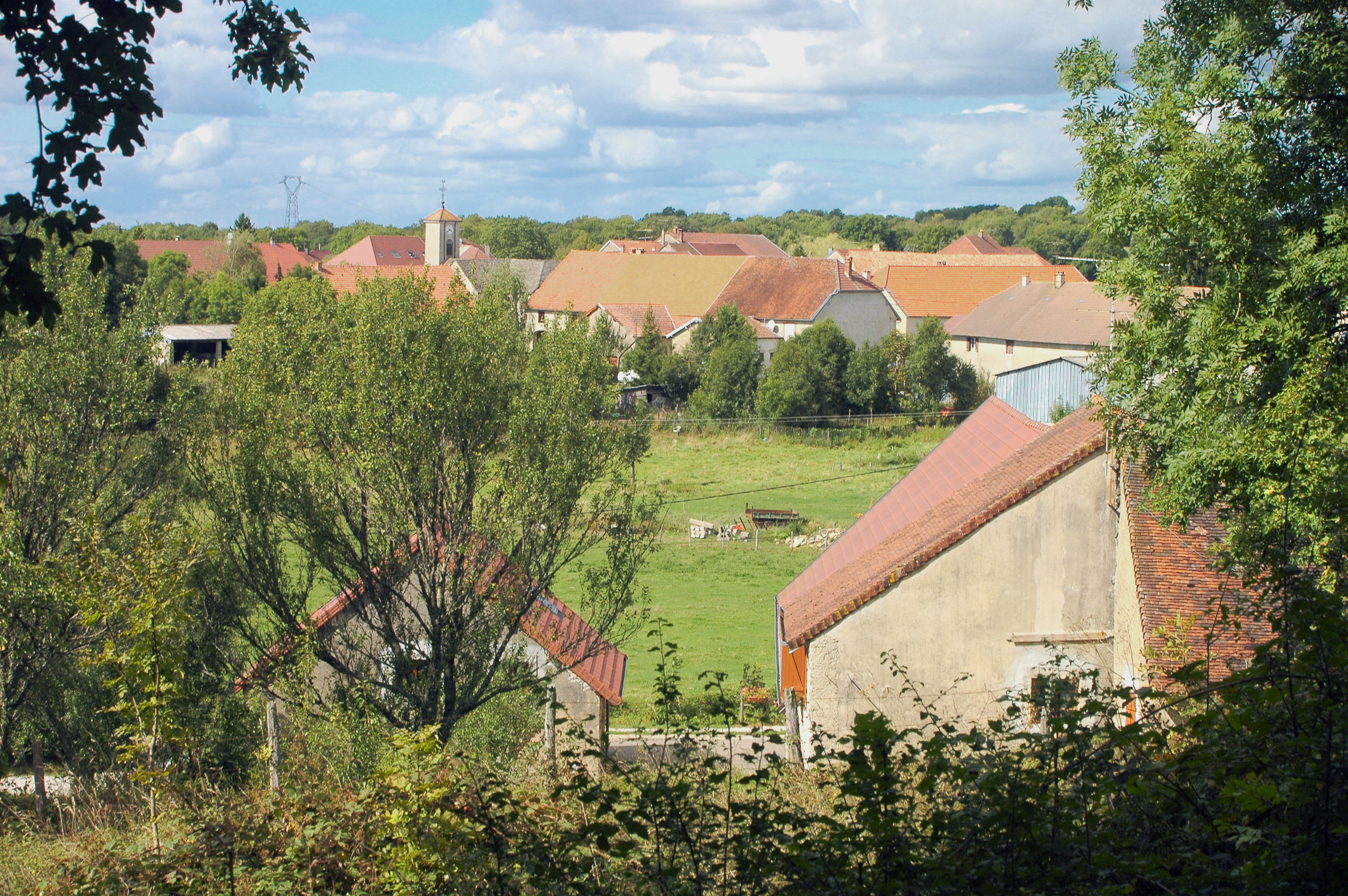
- A general view of Nogna
- Location of Nogna
- Location within France Location within Bourgogne-Franche-Comté
- Coordinates: 46°35′59″N 5°38′36″E
- Country: France
- Region: Bourgogne-Franche-Comté
- Department: Jura
- Arrondissement: Lons-le-Saunier
- Canton: Poligny
- Intercommunality: Terre d'Émeraude Communauté

Government
  - Mayor (2020–2026): Yannick Cassabois
- Area^{1}: 6.11 km^{2} (2.36 sq mi)
- Highest elevation: 623 m (2,044 ft)
- Lowest elevation: 497 m (1,631 ft)
- Population (2023): 308
  - Density: 50.4/km^{2} (131/sq mi)
- Time zone: UTC+01:00 (CET)
  - Summer (DST): UTC+02:00 (CEST)
- INSEE/Postal code: 39390 /39570
- ^{1} French Land Register data, which excludes lakes, ponds, glaciers > 1 km^{2} (0.386 sq mi or 247 acres) and river estuaries.

Nogna (French pronunciation: [nɔɲa]) is a commune in the Jura department and Bourgogne-Franche-Comté region of eastern France.

== Population ==
Historical population
Year	Pop.	±% p.a.
1968	185	—
1975	169	−1.28%
1982	187	+1.46%
1990	192	+0.33%
1999	203	+0.62%
2007	227	+1.41%
2012	271	+3.61%
2017	295	+1.71%
2023	308	+0.72%
Source: INSEE

== See also ==
- Communes of the Jura department
