= Chaussenans =

Commune in Bourgogne-Franche-Comté, France

- Commune
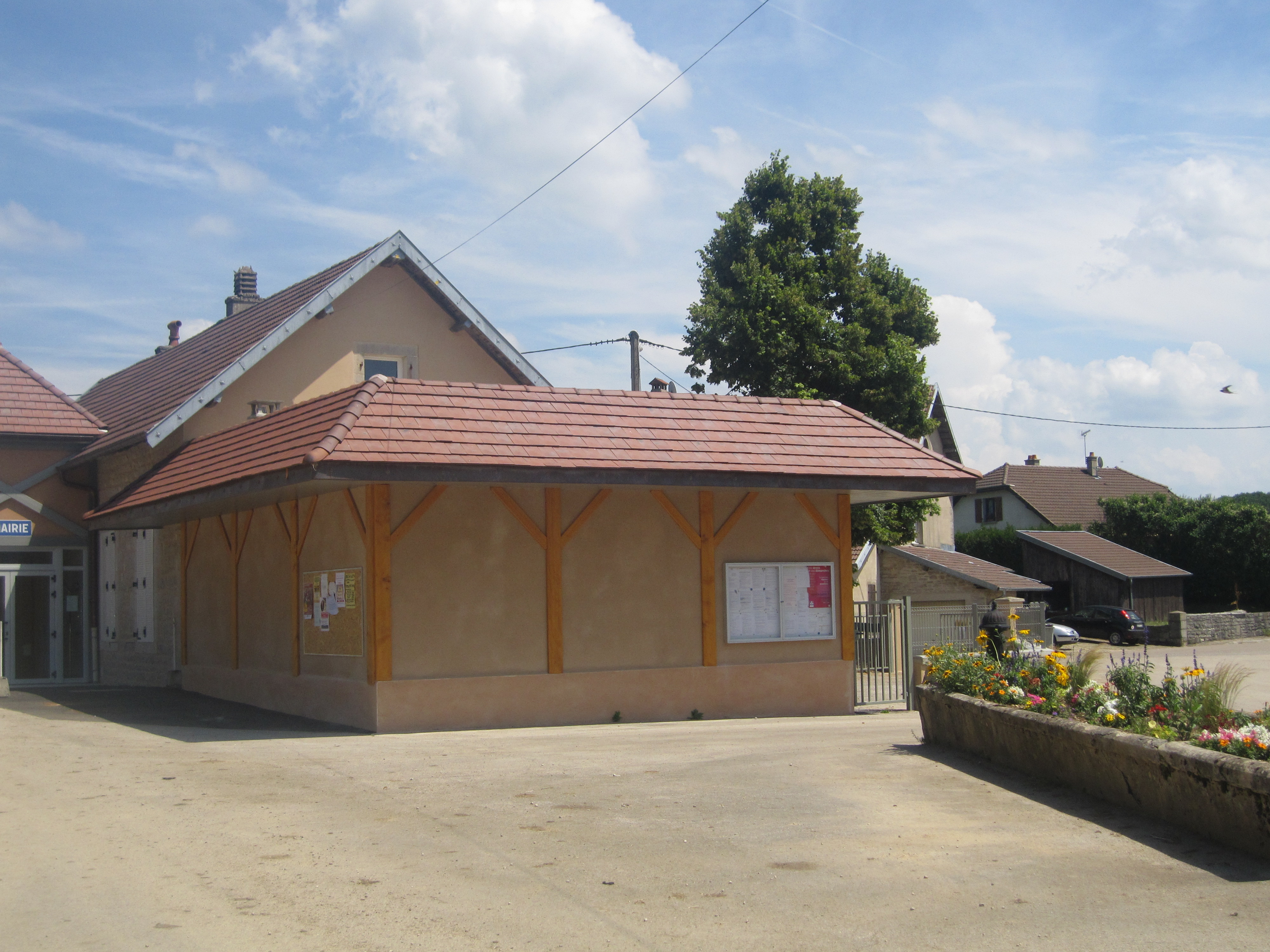
- Town hall
- Location of Chaussenans
- Location within France Location within Bourgogne-Franche-Comté
- Coordinates: 46°49′51″N 5°43′53″E
- Country: France
- Region: Bourgogne-Franche-Comté
- Department: Jura
- Arrondissement: Dole
- Canton: Poligny

Government
  - Mayor (2020–2026): Laurent Masson
- Area^{1}: 4.40 km^{2} (1.70 sq mi)
- Highest elevation: 580 m (1,900 ft)
- Lowest elevation: 546 m (1,791 ft)
- Population (2023): 102
  - Density: 23.2/km^{2} (60.0/sq mi)
- Time zone: UTC+01:00 (CET)
  - Summer (DST): UTC+02:00 (CEST)
- INSEE/Postal code: 39127 /39800
- ^{1} French Land Register data, which excludes lakes, ponds, glaciers > 1 km^{2} (0.386 sq mi or 247 acres) and river estuaries.

Chaussenans (Arpitan: Tsassena) is a commune in the Jura department in Bourgogne-Franche-Comté in eastern France.

== Population ==
Historical population
Year	Pop.	±% p.a.
1968	90	—
1975	80	−1.67%
1982	71	−1.69%
1990	79	+1.34%
1999	89	+1.33%
2007	110	+2.68%
2012	103	−1.31%
2017	100	−0.59%
2023	102	+0.33%
Source: INSEE

== See also ==
- Communes of the Jura department
