= Poids-de-Fiole =

Commune in Bourgogne-Franche-Comté, France

- Commune
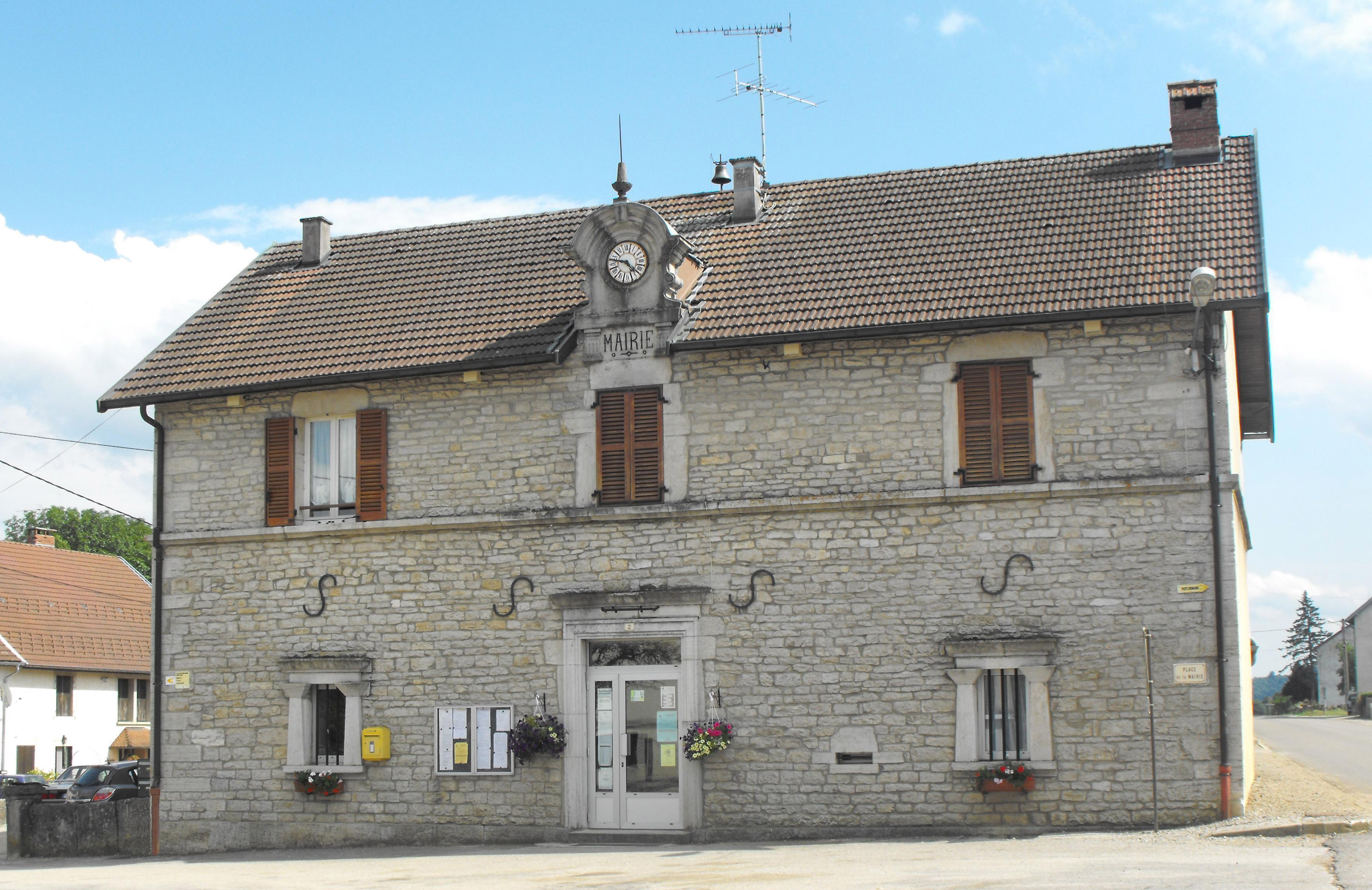
- Town hall
- Location of Poids-de-Fiole
- Location within France Location within Bourgogne-Franche-Comté
- Coordinates: 46°35′48″N 5°37′51″E
- Country: France
- Region: Bourgogne-Franche-Comté
- Department: Jura
- Arrondissement: Lons-le-Saunier
- Canton: Poligny

Government
  - Mayor (2020–2026): Florence Gros-Fuand
- Area^{1}: 6.49 km^{2} (2.51 sq mi)
- Highest elevation: 611 m (2,005 ft)
- Lowest elevation: 513 m (1,683 ft)
- Population (2023): 323
  - Density: 49.8/km^{2} (129/sq mi)
- Time zone: UTC+01:00 (CET)
  - Summer (DST): UTC+02:00 (CEST)
- INSEE/Postal code: 39431 /39570
- ^{1} French Land Register data, which excludes lakes, ponds, glaciers > 1 km^{2} (0.386 sq mi or 247 acres) and river estuaries.

Poids-de-Fiole (French pronunciation: [pwa də fjɔl]) is a commune in the Jura department in Bourgogne-Franche-Comté in eastern France.

== Population ==
Historical population
Year	Pop.	±% p.a.
1968	145	—
1975	183	+3.38%
1982	296	+7.11%
1990	274	−0.96%
1999	249	−1.06%
2007	295	+2.14%
2012	312	+1.13%
2017	333	+1.31%
2023	323	−0.51%
Source: INSEE

== See also ==
- Communes of the Jura department
