= La Marre =

Commune in Bourgogne-Franche-Comté, France

- Commune
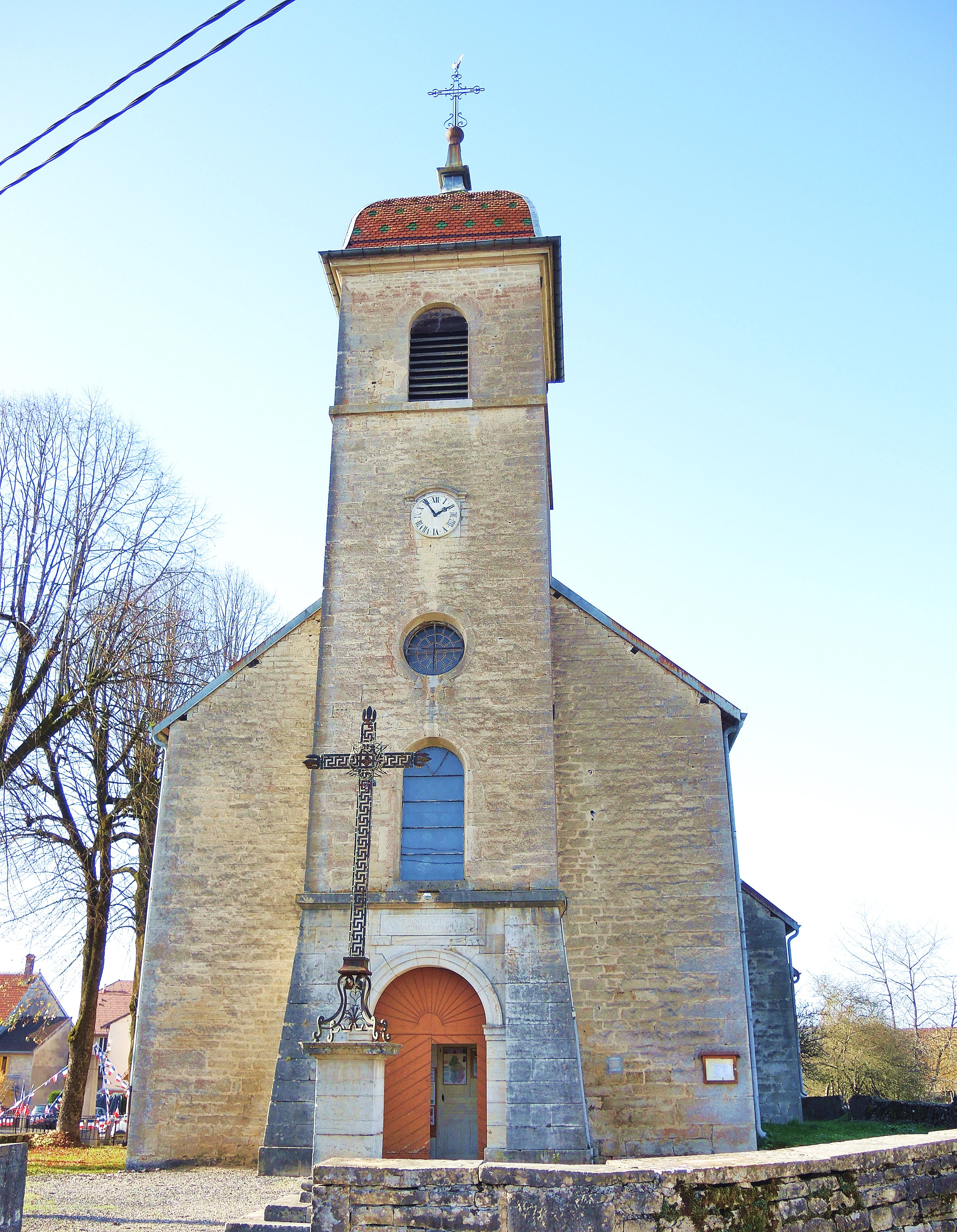
- The church in La Marre
- Location of La Marre
- Location within France Location within Bourgogne-Franche-Comté
- Coordinates: 46°44′08″N 5°41′58″E
- Country: France
- Region: Bourgogne-Franche-Comté
- Department: Jura
- Arrondissement: Lons-le-Saunier
- Canton: Poligny

Government
  - Mayor (2020–2026): Joël Paget
- Area^{1}: 10.63 km^{2} (4.10 sq mi)
- Highest elevation: 576 m (1,890 ft)
- Lowest elevation: 510 m (1,670 ft)
- Population (2023): 350
  - Density: 33/km^{2} (85/sq mi)
- Time zone: UTC+01:00 (CET)
  - Summer (DST): UTC+02:00 (CEST)
- INSEE/Postal code: 39317 /39210
- ^{1} French Land Register data, which excludes lakes, ponds, glaciers > 1 km^{2} (0.386 sq mi or 247 acres) and river estuaries.

La Marre (French pronunciation: [la maʁ]) is a commune in the Jura department in Bourgogne-Franche-Comté in eastern France.

== Population ==
Historical population
Year	Pop.	±% p.a.
1968	270	—
1975	253	−0.92%
1982	234	−1.11%
1990	249	+0.78%
1999	308	+2.39%
2007	328	+0.79%
2012	328	+0.00%
2017	338	+0.60%
2023	350	+0.58%
Source: INSEE

== See also ==
- Communes of the Jura department
