= Communes of the Jura department =

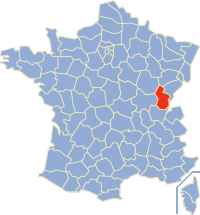

The following is a list of the 492 communes of the Jura department of France.

The communes cooperate in the following intercommunalities (as of 2025):

- Communauté d'agglomération Espace Communautaire Lons Agglomération
- Communauté d'agglomération du Grand Dole
- Communauté de communes Arbois, Poligny, Salins – Cœur du Jura
- Communauté de communes Bresse Haute Seille
- Communauté de communes Champagnole Nozeroy Jura
- Communauté de communes la Grandvallière
- Communauté de communes Haut-Jura Arcade
- Communauté de communes Haut-Jura Saint-Claude
- Communauté de communes Jura Nord
- Communauté de communes de la Plaine Jurassienne
- Communauté de communes Porte du Jura
- Communauté de communes de la Station des Rousses-Haut-Jura
- Communauté de communes du Val d'Amour
- Communauté de communes Terre d'Émeraude Communauté

INSEE code	Postal code	Commune
39001	39500	Abergement-la-Ronce
39002	39600	Abergement-le-Grand
39003	39800	Abergement-le-Petit
39004	39110	Abergement-lès-Thésy
39006	39110	Aiglepierre
39007	39270	Alièze
39008	39700	Amange
39009	39110	Andelot-en-Montagne
39010	39320	Andelot-Morval
39011	39120	Annoire
39013	39600	Arbois
39014	39290	Archelange
39015	39300	Ardon
39586	39110	Aresches
39016	39240	Arinthod
39017	39140	Arlay
39018	39240	Aromas
39020	39250	Arsure-Arsurette
39019	39600	Les Arsures
39022	39120	Asnans-Beauvoisin
39024	39700	Audelange
39025	39190	Augea
39026	39380	Augerans
39027	39270	Augisey
39028	39800	Aumont
39029	39410	Aumur
39030	39100	Authume
39031	39700	Auxange
39032	39200	Avignon-lès-Saint-Claude
39034	39120	Balaiseaux
39035	39160	Balanod
39037	39380	Bans
39038	39130	Barésia-sur-l'Ain
39039	39700	La Barre
39040	39800	Barretaine
39041	39210	Baume-les-Messieurs
39042	39100	Baverans
39043	39190	Beaufort-Orbagna
39045	39270	Beffia
39046	39310	Bellecombe
39047	39400	Bellefontaine
39048	39380	Belmont
39049	39800	Bersaillin
39050	39800	Besain
39051	39290	Biarne
39052	39150	Bief-des-Maisons
39053	39250	Bief-du-Fourg
39054	39800	Biefmorin
39055	39250	Billecul
39056	39140	Bletterans
39057	39210	Blois-sur-Seille
39058	39130	Blye
39059	39220	Bois-d'Amont
39060	39230	Bois-de-Gand
39061	39130	Boissia
39062	39240	La Boissière
39063	39130	Bonlieu
39065	39800	Bonnefontaine
39066	39570	Bornay
39068	39370	Les Bouchoux
39070	39300	Bourg-de-Sirod
39072	39110	Bracon
39073	39800	Brainans
39074	39290	Brans
39076	39700	La Bretenière
39077	39120	Bretenières
39078	39100	Brevans
39079	39570	Briod
39080	39320	Broissia
39081	39800	Buvilly
39083	39250	Censeau
39084	39110	Cernans
39085	39250	Cerniébaud
39086	39240	Cernon
39088	39570	Cesancey
39021	39270	La Chailleuse
39090	39120	Chaînée-des-Coupis
39091	39150	Les Chalesmes
39092	39270	Chambéria
39093	39380	Chamblay
39094	39800	Chamole
39095	39600	Champagne-sur-Loue
39096	39290	Champagney
39097	39300	Champagnole
39099	39500	Champdivers
39100	39230	Champrougier
39101	39100	Champvans
39102	01590	Chancia
39103	39110	La Chapelle-sur-Furieuse
39104	39140	Chapelle-Voland
39105	39300	Chapois
39106	39260	Charchilla
39107	39130	Charcier
39108	39250	Charency
39109	39130	Charézier
39110	39230	La Charme
39111	39240	Charnod
39112	39230	La Chassagne
39339	39360	Chassal-Molinges
39114	39210	Château-Chalon
39116	39600	La Châtelaine
39117	39380	Chatelay
39118	39130	Châtel-de-Joux
39119	39230	Le Chateley
39120	39300	Châtelneuf
39121	39700	Châtenois
39122	39130	Châtillon
39124	39230	Chaumergy
39126	39150	La Chaumusse
39127	39800	Chaussenans
39128	39120	Chaussin
39133	39110	Chaux-Champagny
39129	39150	Chaux-des-Crotenay
39131	39150	La Chaux-du-Dombief
39132	39230	La Chaux-en-Bresse
39134	39270	Chavéria
39136	39230	Chemenot
39138	39120	Chemin
39139	39120	Chêne-Bernard
39140	39230	Chêne-Sec
39141	39290	Chevigny
39142	39190	Chevreaux
39143	39130	Chevrotaine
39145	39570	Chille
39146	39570	Chilly-le-Vignoble
39147	39110	Chilly-sur-Salins
39149	39380	Chissey-sur-Loue
39150	39100	Choisey
39151	39370	Choux
39153	39300	Cize
39154	39130	Clairvaux-les-Lacs
39155	39110	Clucy
39156	39130	Cogna
39157	39200	Coiserette
39159	39800	Colonne
39160	39140	Commenailles
39162	39570	Condamine
39163	39240	Condes
39164	39570	Conliège
39165	39300	Conte
39166	39240	Cornod
39167	39140	Cosges
39491	39170	Coteaux du Lizon
39168	39570	Courbette
39169	39570	Courbouzon
39170	39570	Courlans
39171	39570	Courlaoux
39172	39700	Courtefontaine
39173	39190	Cousance
39174	39200	Coyrière
39175	39260	Coyron
39176	39600	Cramans
39178	39300	Crans
39179	39260	Crenans
39180	39270	Cressia
39182	39100	Crissey
39183	39300	Crotenay
39184	39260	Les Crozets
39185	39190	Cuisia
39187	39250	Cuvier
39188	39290	Dammartin-Marpain
39189	39500	Damparis
39190	39700	Dampierre
39191	39230	Darbonnay
39192	39130	Denezières
39193	39120	Le Deschaux
39194	39140	Desnes
39196	39230	Les Deux-Fays
39197	39190	Digna
39198	39100	Dole
39199	39210	Domblans
39200	39270	Dompierre-sur-Mont
39201	39130	Doucier
39202	39110	Dournon
39203	39250	Doye
39204	39240	Dramelay
39205	39700	Éclans-Nenon
39206	39600	Écleux
39207	39270	Écrille
39208	39150	Entre-deux-Monts
39210	39300	Équevillon
39211	39120	Les Essards-Taignevaux
39214	39250	Esserval-Tartre
39216	39130	Étival
39217	39570	L'Étoile
39218	39700	Étrepigney
39219	39700	Évans
39220	39700	Falletans
39221	39250	La Favière
39222	39800	Fay-en-Montagne
39223	39600	La Ferté
39225	39800	Le Fied
39227	39520	Foncine-le-Bas
39228	39460	Foncine-le-Haut
39229	39140	Fontainebrux
39230	39130	Fontenu
39232	39150	Fort-du-Plasne
39233	39100	Foucherans
39234	39230	Foulenay
39235	39700	Fraisans
39236	39230	Francheville
39237	39250	Fraroz
39239	39130	La Frasnée
39238	39290	Frasne-les-Meulières
39240	39130	Le Frasnois
39241	39570	Frébuans
39244	39210	Frontenay
39245	39120	Gatey
39246	39350	Gendrey
39247	39240	Genod
39248	39110	Geraise
39249	39380	Germigney
39250	39570	Geruge
39251	39570	Gevingey
39252	39100	Gevry
39253	39320	Gigny
39254	39250	Gillois
39255	39190	Gizia
39258	39150	Grande-Rivière Château
39259	39600	Grange-de-Vaivre
39261	39320	Graye-et-Charnay
39262	39290	Gredisans
39263	39800	Grozon
39265	39130	Hautecour
39177	39570	Hauteroche
39368	39400	Hauts de Bienne
39266	39120	Les Hays
39267	39110	Ivory
39268	39110	Ivrey
39269	39360	Jeurre
39270	39100	Jouhe
39271	39150	Lac-des-Rouges-Truites
39272	39210	Ladoye-sur-Seille
39274	01410	Lajoux
39275	39310	Lamoura
39277	39300	Le Larderet
39278	39130	Largillay-Marsonnay
39279	39140	Larnaud
39280	39360	Larrivoire
39281	39300	Le Latet
39282	39250	La Latette
39283	01590	Lavancia-Épercy
39284	39700	Lavangeot
39285	39700	Lavans-lès-Dole
39286	39170	Lavans-lès-Saint-Claude
39288	39210	Lavigny
39289	39260	Lect
39291	39110	Lemuy
39292	39300	Lent

INSEE code	Postal code	Commune
39293	39170	Leschères
39295	39320	Loisia
39296	39230	Lombard
39297	39400	Longchaumois
39298	39250	Longcochon
39299	39120	Longwy-sur-le-Doubs
39300	39000	Lons-le-Saunier
39301	39300	Loulle
39302	39350	Louvatange
39304	39210	Le Louverot
39305	39380	La Loye
39306	39570	Macornay
39307	39260	Maisod
39308	39700	Malange
39310	39230	Mantry
39312	39240	Marigna-sur-Valouse
39313	39130	Marigny
39314	39270	Marnézia
39315	39110	Marnoz
39317	39210	La Marre
39318	39260	Martigna
39319	39600	Mathenay
39320	39190	Maynal
39321	39210	Menétru-le-Vignoble
39322	39130	Menétrux-en-Joux
39323	39290	Menotey
39324	39270	Mérona
39325	39600	Mesnay
39326	39130	Mesnois
39327	39570	Messia-sur-Sorne
39328	39260	Meussia
39329	39250	Mièges
39330	39800	Miéry
39331	39250	Mignovillard
39333	39260	Moirans-en-Montagne
39334	39570	Moiron
39335	39290	Moissey
39336	39800	Molain
39337	39600	Molamboz
39338	39500	Molay
39342	39230	Monay
39343	39320	Monnetay
39344	39300	Monnet-la-Ville
39345	39100	Monnières
39346	39160	Montagna-le-Reconduit
39348	39570	Montaigu
39349	39210	Montain
39350	39380	Montbarrey
39351	39260	Montcusel
39352	39700	Monteplain
39353	39320	Montfleur
39354	39800	Montholier
39355	39600	Montigny-lès-Arsures
39356	39300	Montigny-sur-l'Ain
39273	39320	Montlainsia
39359	39110	Montmarlon
39360	39290	Montmirey-la-Ville
39361	39290	Montmirey-le-Château
39362	39570	Montmorot
39363	39320	Montrevel
39364	39300	Montrond
39365	39380	Mont-sous-Vaudrey
39366	39300	Mont-sur-Monnet
39367	39400	Morbier
39370	39330	Mouchard
39372	39250	Mournans-Charbonny
39373	39310	Les Moussières
39375	39270	Moutonne
39376	39300	Moutoux
39377	39290	Mutigney
39379	39140	Nance
39130	39150	Nanchez
39380	39270	Nancuise
39381	39300	Les Nans
39385	39120	Neublans-Abergement
39386	39800	Neuvilley
39387	39380	Nevy-lès-Dole
39388	39210	Nevy-sur-Seille
39389	39300	Ney
39390	39570	Nogna
39391	39250	Nozeroy
39392	39290	Offlanges
39393	39250	Onglières
39394	39270	Onoz
39396	39700	Orchamps
39397	39270	Orgelet
39398	39350	Ougney
39399	39380	Ounans
39400	39700	Our
39401	39800	Oussières
39402	39350	Pagney
39403	39330	Pagnoz
39404	39570	Pannessières
39405	39100	Parcey
39406	39300	Le Pasquier
39407	39230	Passenans
39408	39130	Patornay
39409	39290	Peintre
39411	39570	Perrigny
39412	39120	Peseux
39413	39370	La Pesse
39415	39120	Petit-Noir
39418	39800	Picarreau
39419	39300	Pillemoine
39420	39270	Pimorin
39421	39210	Le Pin
39422	39210	Plainoiseau
39423	39270	Plaisia
39424	39150	Les Planches-en-Montagne
39425	39600	Les Planches-près-Arbois
39426	39210	Plasne
39427	39250	Plénise
39428	39250	Plénisette
39429	39120	Pleure
39430	39700	Plumont
39431	39570	Poids-de-Fiole
39432	39290	Pointre
39434	39800	Poligny
39435	39130	Pont-de-Poitte
39436	39110	Pont-d'Héry
39437	39300	Pont-du-Navoy
39439	39330	Port-Lesney
39441	39220	Prémanon
39443	39270	Présilly
39444	39110	Pretin
39445	39570	Publy
39446	39600	Pupillin
39447	39570	Quintigny
39448	39120	Rahon
39449	39290	Rainans
39451	39700	Ranchot
39452	39700	Rans
39453	39170	Ravilloles
39454	39230	Recanoz
39455	39270	Reithouse
39456	39140	Relans
39457	39140	Les Repôts
39458	39570	Revigny
39461	39250	Rix
39460	39200	La Rixouse
39462	39700	Rochefort-sur-Nenon
39463	39360	Rogna
39464	39350	Romain
39465	39700	Romange
39466	39190	Rosay
39467	39190	Rotalier
39468	39270	Rothonay
39469	39350	Rouffange
39470	39220	Les Rousses
39471	39140	Ruffey-sur-Seille
39472	39230	Rye
39473	39130	Saffloz
39475	39160	Saint-Amour
39476	39410	Saint-Aubin
39477	39120	Saint-Baraing
39478	39200	Saint-Claude
39479	39600	Saint-Cyr-Montmalin
39480	39570	Saint-Didier
39481	39300	Saint-Germain-en-Montagne
39137	39240	Saint-Hymetière-sur-Valouse
39486	39230	Saint-Lamain
39487	39150	Saint-Laurent-en-Grandvaux
39489	39230	Saint-Lothain
39490	39120	Saint-Loup
39492	39570	Saint-Maur
39493	39130	Saint-Maurice-Crillat
39494	39150	Saint-Pierre
39495	39110	Saint-Thiébaud
39497	39110	Saizenay
39498	39700	Salans
39499	39350	Saligney
39500	39110	Salins-les-Bains
39501	39100	Sampans
39502	39380	Santans
39503	39300	Sapois
39504	39270	Sarrogna
39505	39130	Saugeot
39507	39120	Séligney
39508	39230	Sellières
39510	39310	Septmoncel Les Molunes
39511	39230	Sergenaux
39512	39120	Sergenon
39513	39700	Sermange
39514	39700	Serre-les-Moulières
39517	39300	Sirod
39518	39130	Songeson
39519	39130	Soucia
39520	39380	Souvans
39522	39300	Supt
39523	39300	Syam
39525	39120	Tassenières
39526	39500	Tavaux
39527	39350	Taxenne
39528	39290	Thervay
39529	39110	Thésy
39530	39240	Thoirette-Coisia
39531	39130	Thoiria
39532	39160	Thoissia
39533	39230	Toulouse-le-Château
39534	39270	La Tour-du-Meix
39535	39800	Tourmont
39537	39570	Trenal
39378	39160	Les Trois-Châteaux
39538	39130	Uxelles
39539	39600	Vadans
39209	39160	Val-d'Épy
39540	39300	Valempoulières
39576	39190	Val-Sonnette
39485	39320	Val Suran
39290	39240	Valzin en Petite Montagne
39543	39300	Vannoz
39545	39300	Le Vaudioux
39546	39380	Vaudrey
39547	39360	Vaux-lès-Saint-Claude
39550	39570	Verges
39551	39160	Véria
39552	39570	Vernantois
39553	39210	Le Vernois
39554	39300	Vers-en-Montagne
39555	39230	Vers-sous-Sellières
39556	39130	Vertamboz
39557	39240	Vescles
39558	39570	Vevy
39559	39380	La Vieille-Loye
39560	39200	Villard-Saint-Sauveur
39561	39260	Villards-d'Héria
39565	39600	Villeneuve-d'Aval
39567	39570	Villeneuve-sous-Pymont
39568	39800	Villerserine
39569	39600	Villers-Farlay
39570	39120	Villers-les-Bois
39571	39120	Villers-Robert
39572	39600	Villette-lès-Arbois
39573	39100	Villette-lès-Dole
39574	39140	Villevieux
39575	39230	Le Villey
39577	39230	Vincent-Froideville
39579	39360	Viry
39581	39350	Vitreux
39582	39210	Voiteur
39583	39240	Vosbles-Valfin
39584	39700	Vriange
39585	39360	Vulvoz
