= Blois-sur-Seille =

Commune in Bourgogne-Franche-Comté, France

- Commune
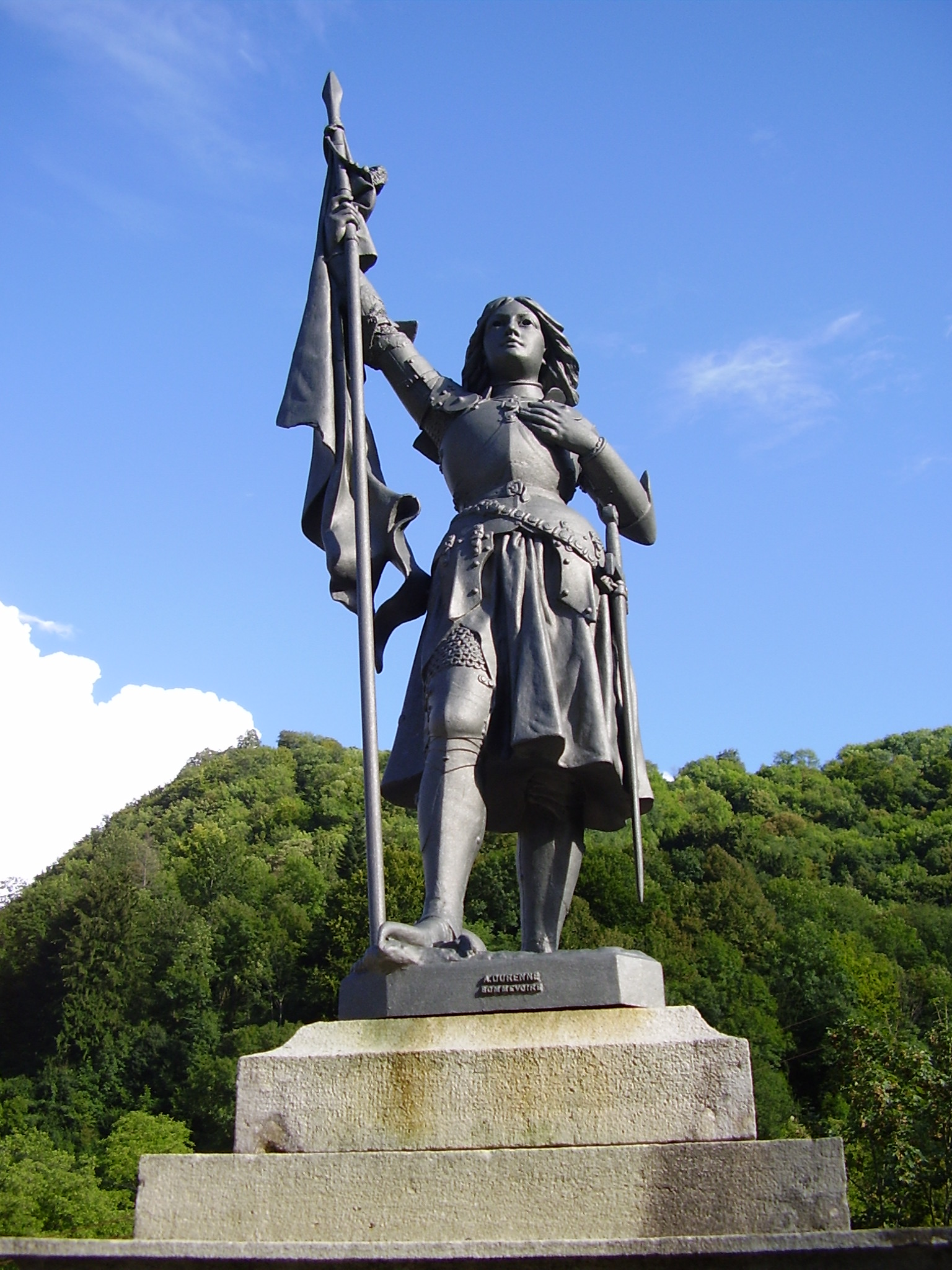
- Statue of Joan of Arc

- Coat of arms
- Location of Blois-sur-Seille
- Location within France Location within Bourgogne-Franche-Comté
- Coordinates: 46°45′00″N 5°40′16″E
- Country: France
- Region: Bourgogne-Franche-Comté
- Department: Jura
- Arrondissement: Lons-le-Saunier
- Canton: Poligny

Government
  - Mayor (2020–2026): Laurent Besancon
- Area^{1}: 5.40 km^{2} (2.08 sq mi)
- Highest elevation: 548 m (1,798 ft)
- Lowest elevation: 285 m (935 ft)
- Population (2023): 102
  - Density: 18.9/km^{2} (48.9/sq mi)
- Time zone: UTC+01:00 (CET)
  - Summer (DST): UTC+02:00 (CEST)
- INSEE/Postal code: 39057 /39210
- ^{1} French Land Register data, which excludes lakes, ponds, glaciers > 1 km^{2} (0.386 sq mi or 247 acres) and river estuaries.

Blois-sur-Seille (French pronunciation: [blwa syʁ sɛj], literally Blois on Seille) is a commune in the French department of Jura, Bourgogne-Franche-Comté, eastern France.

== Population ==
Historical population
Year	Pop.	±% p.a.
1968	100	—
1975	89	−1.65%
1982	82	−1.16%
1990	79	−0.46%
1999	82	+0.41%
2007	100	+2.51%
2012	112	+2.29%
2017	105	−1.28%
2023	102	−0.48%
Source: INSEE

== See also ==
- Communes of the Jura department
