= Canton of Poligny =

Coordinates: 46°50′58″N 5°39′50″E

Poligny
- Canton
- Interactive map of Poligny
- Country: France
- Region: Bourgogne-Franche-Comté
- Department: Jura
- No. of communes: {{{nbcomm}}}

Government
  - Representatives (2021–2028): Dominique Chalumeaux and Christelle Morbois
- Area: 386.62 km^{2} (149.27 sq mi)
- Population (2023): 17,195
  - Density: 44.475/km^{2} (115.19/sq mi)
- INSEE code: 39 12

The Canton of Poligny is a canton within the department of Jura in the French region of Bourgogne-Franche-Comté.

== Composition ==
Since the French canton reorganisation which came into effect in March 2015, the communes of the canton of Poligny are:

1. Baume-les-Messieurs
2. Besain
3. Blois-sur-Seille
4. Blye
5. Bonnefontaine
6. Briod
7. Buvilly
8. Chamole
9. Château-Chalon
10. Châtillon
11. Chaussenans
12. Conliège
13. Domblans
14. Fay-en-Montagne
15. Le Fied
16. Frontenay
17. Hauteroche
18. Ladoye-sur-Seille
19. Lavigny
20. Le Louverot
21. La Marre
22. Menétru-le-Vignoble
23. Molain
24. Montaigu
25. Montain
26. Nevy-sur-Seille
27. Nogna
28. Pannessières
29. Perrigny
30. Picarreau
31. Le Pin
32. Plainoiseau
33. Poids-de-Fiole
34. Poligny
35. Publy
36. Revigny
37. Saint-Maur
38. Verges
39. Le Vernois
40. Vevy
41. Voiteur
