= Frontenay =

Commune in Bourgogne-Franche-Comté, France

- Commune
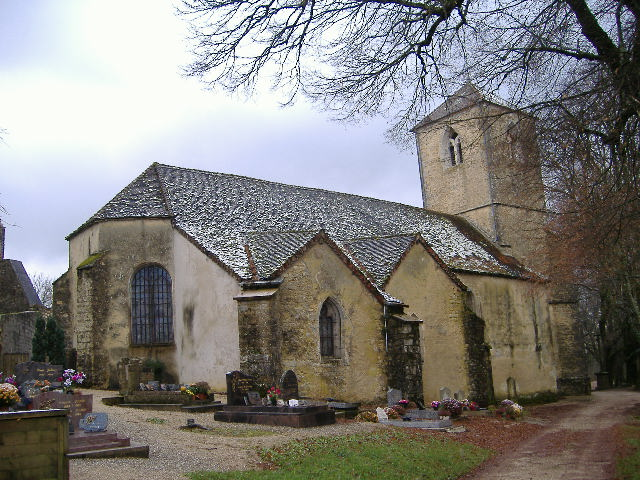
- The church in Frontenay
- Location of Frontenay
- Location within France Location within Bourgogne-Franche-Comté
- Coordinates: 46°47′11″N 5°36′54″E
- Country: France
- Region: Bourgogne-Franche-Comté
- Department: Jura
- Arrondissement: Lons-le-Saunier
- Canton: Poligny

Government
  - Mayor (2020–2026): Stéphane Glénadel
- Area^{1}: 8.13 km^{2} (3.14 sq mi)
- Highest elevation: 563 m (1,847 ft)
- Lowest elevation: 250 m (820 ft)
- Population (2023): 155
  - Density: 19.1/km^{2} (49.4/sq mi)
- Time zone: UTC+01:00 (CET)
  - Summer (DST): UTC+02:00 (CEST)
- INSEE/Postal code: 39244 /39210
- ^{1} French Land Register data, which excludes lakes, ponds, glaciers > 1 km^{2} (0.386 sq mi or 247 acres) and river estuaries.

Frontenay (French pronunciation: [fʁɔ̃tnɛ]) is a commune in the Jura department in Bourgogne-Franche-Comté in eastern France.

== Population ==
Historical population
Year	Pop.	±% p.a.
1968	205	—
1975	158	−3.65%
1982	170	+1.05%
1990	166	−0.30%
1999	170	+0.26%
2007	159	−0.83%
2012	169	+1.23%
2017	172	+0.35%
2023	155	−1.72%
Source: INSEE

== See also ==
- Communes of the Jura department
