= Bonnefontaine =

Commune in Bourgogne-Franche-Comté, France

- Commune
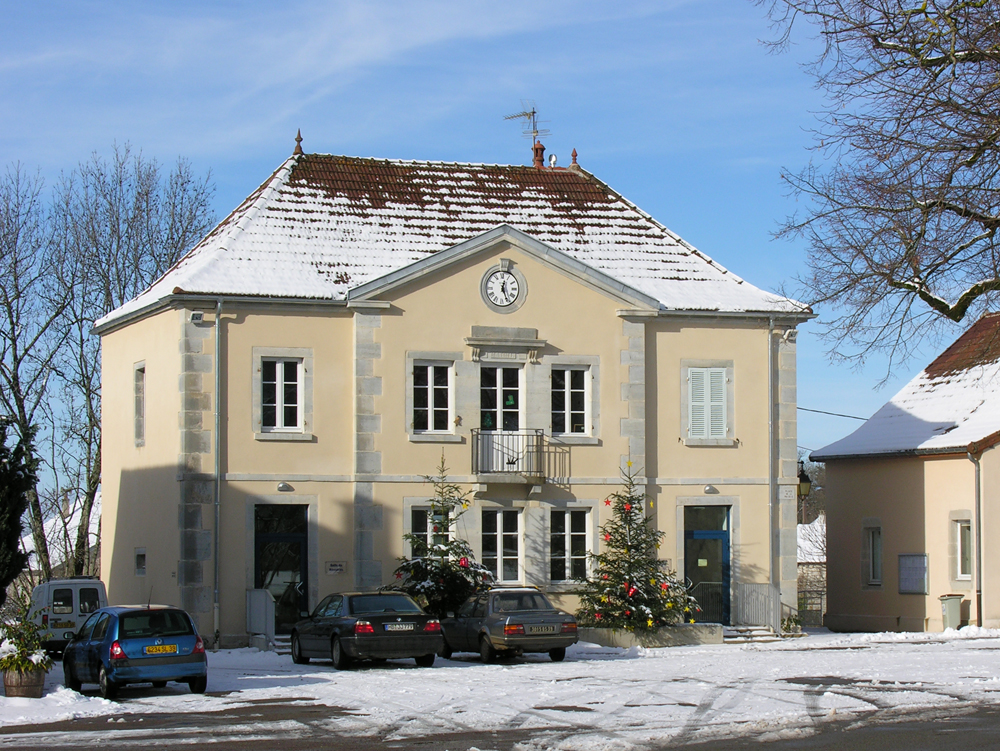
- The town hall in Bonnefontaine
- Location of Bonnefontaine
- Location within France Location within Bourgogne-Franche-Comté
- Coordinates: 46°43′45″N 5°44′51″E
- Country: France
- Region: Bourgogne-Franche-Comté
- Department: Jura
- Arrondissement: Lons-le-Saunier
- Canton: Poligny
- Intercommunality: Bresse Haute Seille

Government
  - Mayor (2020–2026): Isabelle Roussey
- Area^{1}: 8.8 km^{2} (3.4 sq mi)
- Elevation: 580 m (1,900 ft)
- Highest elevation: 745 m (2,444 ft)
- Lowest elevation: 534 m (1,752 ft)
- Population (2023): 103
  - Density: 12/km^{2} (30/sq mi)
- Time zone: UTC+01:00 (CET)
  - Summer (DST): UTC+02:00 (CEST)
- INSEE/Postal code: 39065 /39800
- ^{1} French Land Register data, which excludes lakes, ponds, glaciers > 1 km^{2} (0.386 sq mi or 247 acres) and river estuaries.

Bonnefontaine (French pronunciation: [bɔnfɔ̃tɛn]) is a commune in Jura, a department in Bourgogne-Franche-Comté in eastern France.

== Geography ==
Bonnefontaine is located in the core of the first plateau of the Jura Mountains on the edge of the Côte de l'Heute to 580 meters of altitude. In addition to its centre, the village includes a hamlet : Le Patouillet.

== Population ==
Historical population
Year	Pop.	±% p.a.
1968	107	—
1975	86	−3.07%
1982	97	+1.73%
1990	98	+0.13%
1999	84	−1.70%
2007	93	+1.28%
2012	97	+0.85%
2017	104	+1.40%
2023	103	−0.16%
Source: INSEE

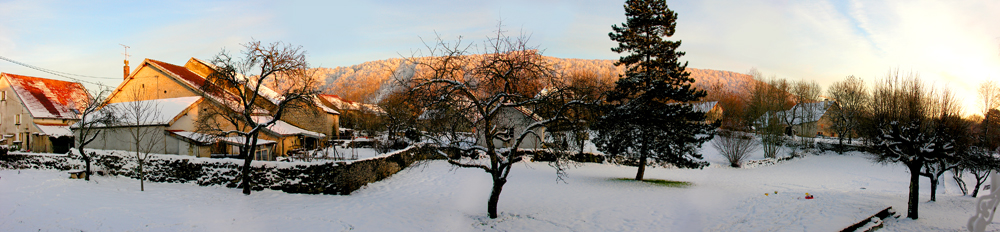
Bonnefontaine in winter

== Gallery ==
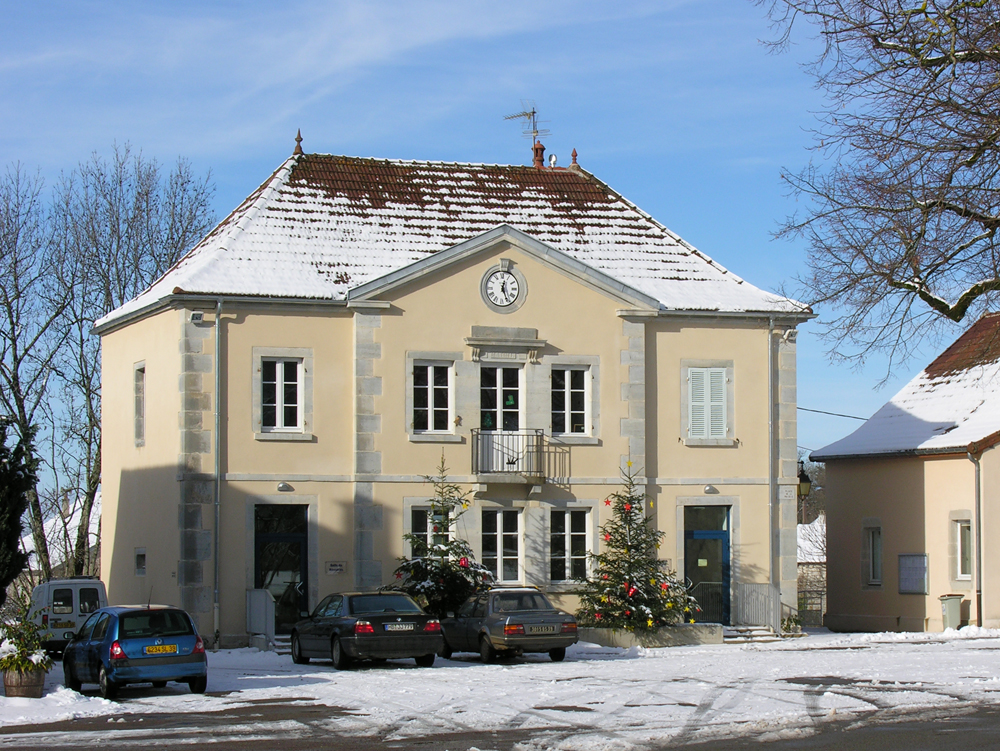
Town hall

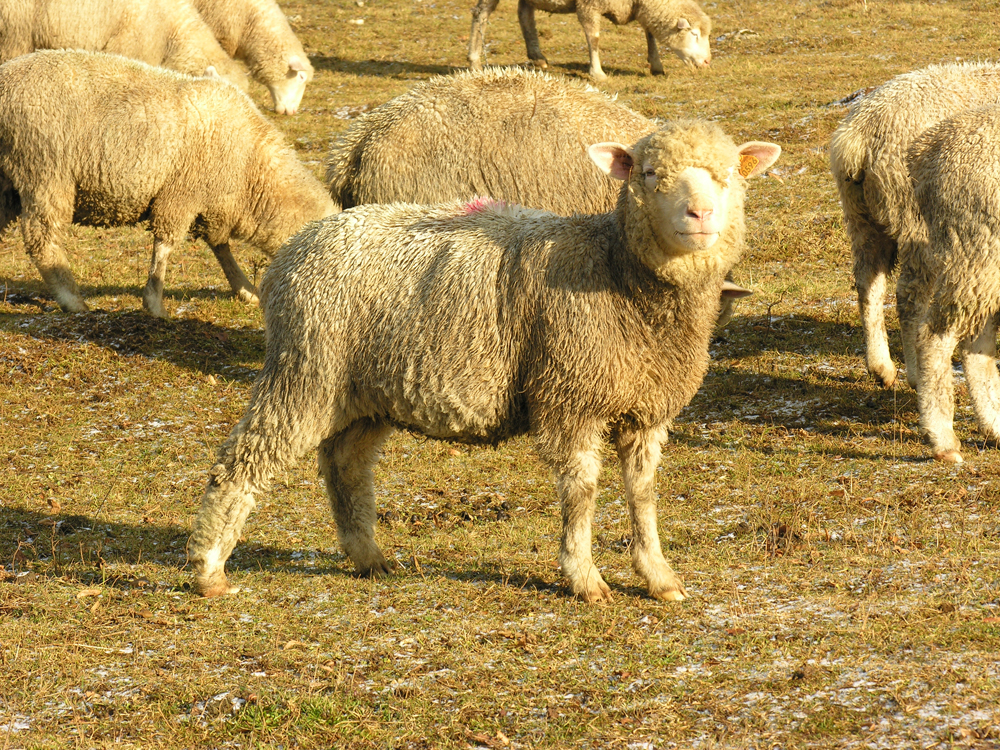
The « Bergerie de l'Heute »'s ewes

== See also ==
- Communes of the Jura department
