= Molain, Jura =

Commune in Bourgogne-Franche-Comté, France

Molain
- Commune
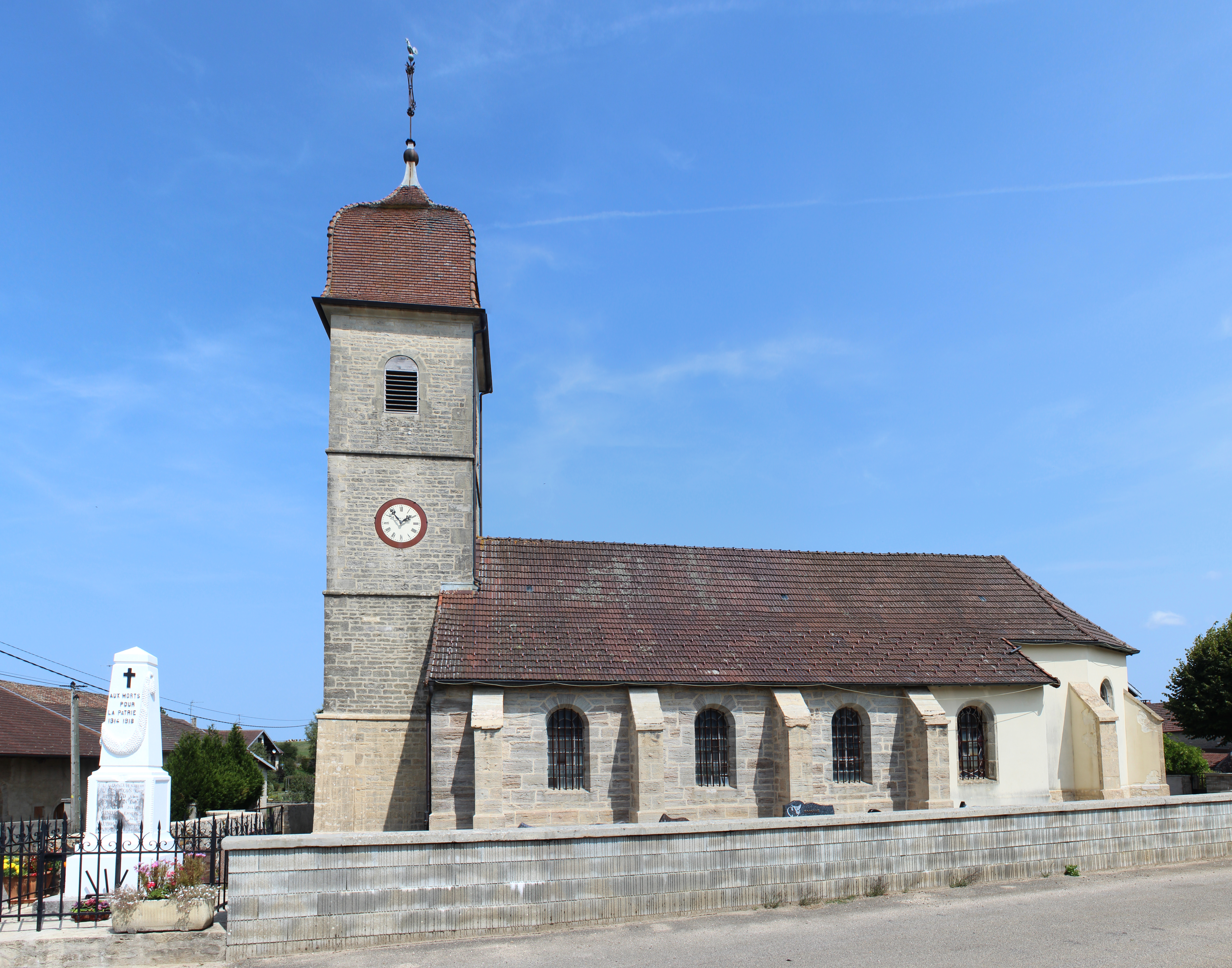
- The church in Molain
- Location of Molain
- Location within France Location within Bourgogne-Franche-Comté
- Coordinates: 46°49′30″N 5°48′28″E
- Country: France
- Region: Bourgogne-Franche-Comté
- Department: Jura
- Arrondissement: Dole
- Canton: Poligny

Government
  - Mayor (2020–2026): Raphaël Gagneur
- Area^{1}: 11.50 km^{2} (4.44 sq mi)
- Highest elevation: 686 m (2,251 ft)
- Lowest elevation: 560 m (1,840 ft)
- Population (2023): 111
  - Density: 9.65/km^{2} (25.0/sq mi)
- Time zone: UTC+01:00 (CET)
  - Summer (DST): UTC+02:00 (CEST)
- INSEE/Postal code: 39336 /39800
- ^{1} French Land Register data, which excludes lakes, ponds, glaciers > 1 km^{2} (0.386 sq mi or 247 acres) and river estuaries.

Molain (French pronunciation: [mɔlɛ̃]) is a commune in the Jura department in Bourgogne-Franche-Comté in eastern France.

== Population ==
Historical population
Year	Pop.	±% p.a.
1968	91	—
1975	83	−1.31%
1982	99	+2.55%
1990	96	−0.38%
1999	94	−0.23%
2007	122	+3.31%
2012	123	+0.16%
2017	105	−3.11%
2023	111	+0.93%
Source: INSEE

== See also ==
- Communes of the Jura department
