= Lavigny, Jura =

Commune in Bourgogne-Franche-Comté, France

Lavigny
- Commune
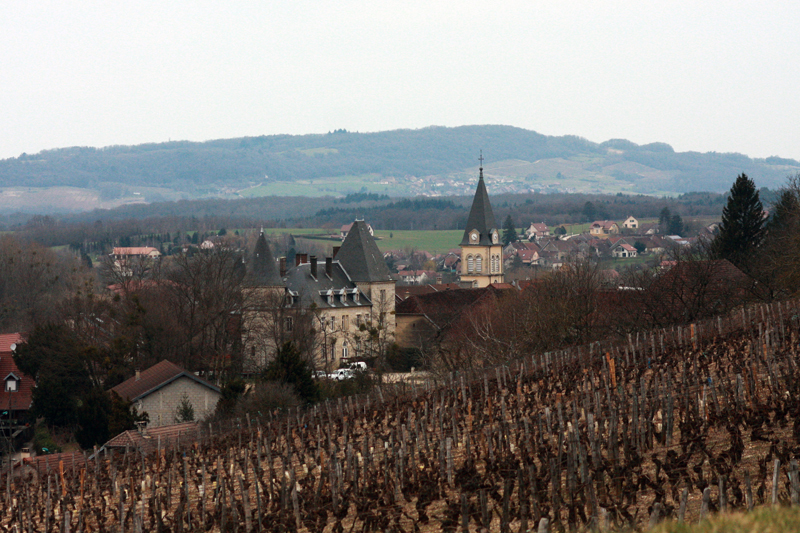
- A general view of Lavigny
- Location of Lavigny
- Location within France Location within Bourgogne-Franche-Comté
- Coordinates: 46°43′03″N 5°35′50″E
- Country: France
- Region: Bourgogne-Franche-Comté
- Department: Jura
- Arrondissement: Lons-le-Saunier
- Canton: Poligny

Government
  - Mayor (2020–2026): Luc Michaud-Gros-Benoit
- Area^{1}: 5.38 km^{2} (2.08 sq mi)
- Highest elevation: 517 m (1,696 ft)
- Lowest elevation: 275 m (902 ft)
- Population (2023): 380
  - Density: 71/km^{2} (180/sq mi)
- Time zone: UTC+01:00 (CET)
  - Summer (DST): UTC+02:00 (CEST)
- INSEE/Postal code: 39288 /39210
- ^{1} French Land Register data, which excludes lakes, ponds, glaciers > 1 km^{2} (0.386 sq mi or 247 acres) and river estuaries.

Lavigny (French pronunciation: [laviɲi]) is a commune in the Jura department in Bourgogne-Franche-Comté in eastern France.

== Population ==
Historical population
Year	Pop.	±% p.a.
1968	308	—
1975	347	+1.72%
1982	401	+2.09%
1990	373	−0.90%
1999	363	−0.30%
2007	361	−0.07%
2012	370	+0.49%
2017	378	+0.43%
2023	380	+0.09%
Source: INSEE

== See also ==
- Communes of the Jura department
