= Châtillon, Jura, France =

Commune in Bourgogne-Franche-Comté, France

Châtillon
- Commune
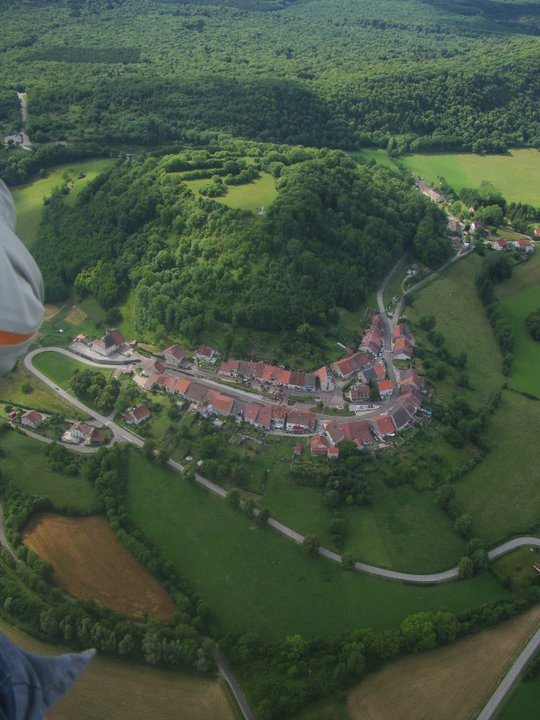
- A general view of Châtillon
- Location of Châtillon
- Location within France Location within Bourgogne-Franche-Comté
- Coordinates: 46°39′34″N 5°43′51″E
- Country: France
- Region: Bourgogne-Franche-Comté
- Department: Jura
- Arrondissement: Lons-le-Saunier
- Canton: Poligny

Government
  - Mayor (2020–2026): Gilles Morisseau
- Area^{1}: 16.77 km^{2} (6.47 sq mi)
- Highest elevation: 747 m (2,451 ft)
- Lowest elevation: 447 m (1,467 ft)
- Population (2023): 122
  - Density: 7.27/km^{2} (18.8/sq mi)
- Time zone: UTC+01:00 (CET)
  - Summer (DST): UTC+02:00 (CEST)
- INSEE/Postal code: 39122 /39130
- ^{1} French Land Register data, which excludes lakes, ponds, glaciers > 1 km^{2} (0.386 sq mi or 247 acres) and river estuaries.

Châtillon (French pronunciation: [ʃatijɔ̃]; Arpitan: Tsâtillou) is a commune in the Jura department in Bourgogne-Franche-Comté in eastern France.

== Population ==
Historical population
Year	Pop.	±% p.a.
1968	209	—
1975	174	−2.58%
1982	133	−3.77%
1990	128	−0.48%
1999	127	−0.09%
2007	122	−0.50%
2012	156	+5.04%
2017	112	−6.41%
2023	122	+1.44%
Source: INSEE

== See also ==
- Communes of the Jura department
