= Monnet =

Monnet may refer to:

== People ==
=== In arts and entertainment ===
- Franck Monnet (born 1967), French singer-songwriter
- Jean Monnet (director) (1703–1785), French theatre impresario and writer
- Marc Monnet (born 1947), French composer

=== In government and politics ===
- Georges Monnet (1898–1980), prominent socialist politician in 1930s France
- Jean Monnet (1888–1979), French civil servant and one of the European Union's founding fathers
- Léon Emmanuel Monnet (born 1952), the Minister of Mines and Energy of Côte d'Ivoire and the governor of Adzopé
- Yannick Monnet (born 1975), French politician

=== Sportspeople ===
- Kévin Monnet-Paquet (born 1988), French footballer
- Philippe Monnet (born 1959), single-handed sailor from France
- Thibaut Monnet (born 1982), Swiss professional ice hockey right wing

=== Other people ===
- Alexandre Monnet, C.S.Sp. (1812–1849), French bishop of the Roman Catholic Church
- Antoine-Grimoald Monnet (1734–1817), French mineralogist and mining expert
- Louis Claude Monnet de Lorbeau (1766–1819), French general who failed to prevent the landing of the Walcheren expedition

== Places ==
- Monnet-la-Ville, commune in the Jura department in Franche-Comté in eastern France
- Mont-sur-Monnet, commune in the Jura department in Franche-Comté in eastern France

== See also ==
- Jean Monnet Foundation for Europe, organisation which supports initiatives dedicated to the construction of European unity
- Jean Monnet Programme, European Commission initiative to encourage teaching, research and reflection in European integration studies
- Jean Monnet University (Université Jean Monnet) is a French public university, based in Saint-Étienne
- Monnet Authority, the first High Authority of the European Coal and Steel Community (ECSC), between 1952 and 1955
- Monnet Plan, reconstruction plan for France proposed by French civil servant Jean Monnet after the end of World War II

== Not to be confused with ==
- Monet (disambiguation)
