= Sapois =

Sapois may refer to:

- Sapois, Jura, a commune in the French region of Franche-Comté
- Sapois, Vosges, a commune in the French region of Lorraine
