= Lac du Fioget =

Lake in France

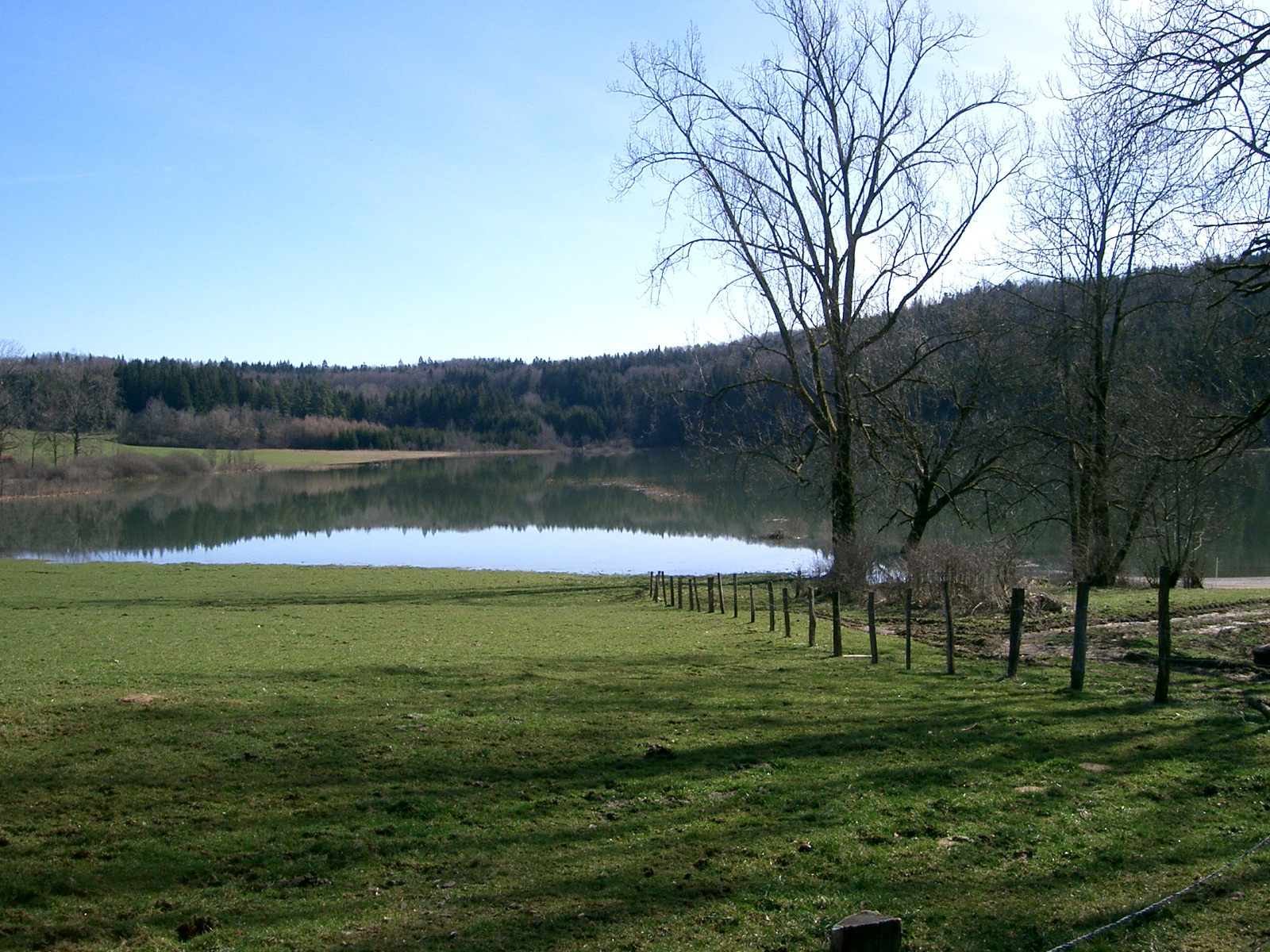

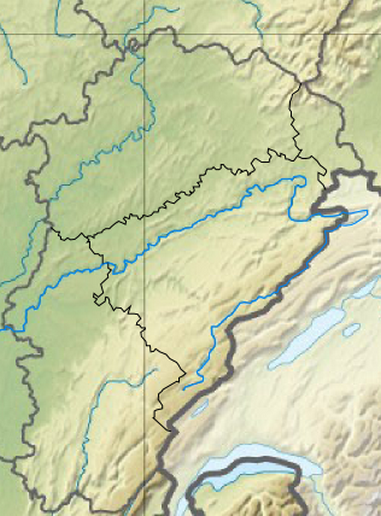
- Location within Franche-Comté
- Location: Châtelneuf, Jura, Franche-Comté
- Coordinates: 46°39′51″N 5°54′37″E
- Basin countries: France

Lac du Fioget is a lake at Châtelneuf in the Jura department of France.
