= Monet (disambiguation) =

Claude Monet (1840–1926) was a French impressionist painter.

Monet may also refer to:

- Monet (name), people with the given name and surname Monet
- Fondation Monet in Giverny, nonprofit organisation
- Monet (crater), on Mercury
- Monet (submarine cable), a cable connecting Brazil and Florida
- Monet Investment Bank, Mongolian underwriting, brokerage and investment banking firm
- MonetDB, a database management system
- Monet-Goyon, French motorcycle manufacturer
- Multiwavelength optical networking, a method of digital fiber-optic communication
- Musée Marmottan Monet, French museum
- Lycée Claude-Monet, French public educational institution
- Rural Municipality of Monet No. 257, Saskatchewan, Canada
- Smart Card Open Monet+, tennis tournament

== See also ==
- Jean Monet (disambiguation)
- Monnet (disambiguation)
- Édouard Manet (1832–1883), French painter
- M (Marvel Comics), Monet Yvette Clarisse Maria Therese St. Croix, a character in the Marvel Comics universe
