= Les Nans =

Commune in Bourgogne-Franche-Comté, France

- Commune
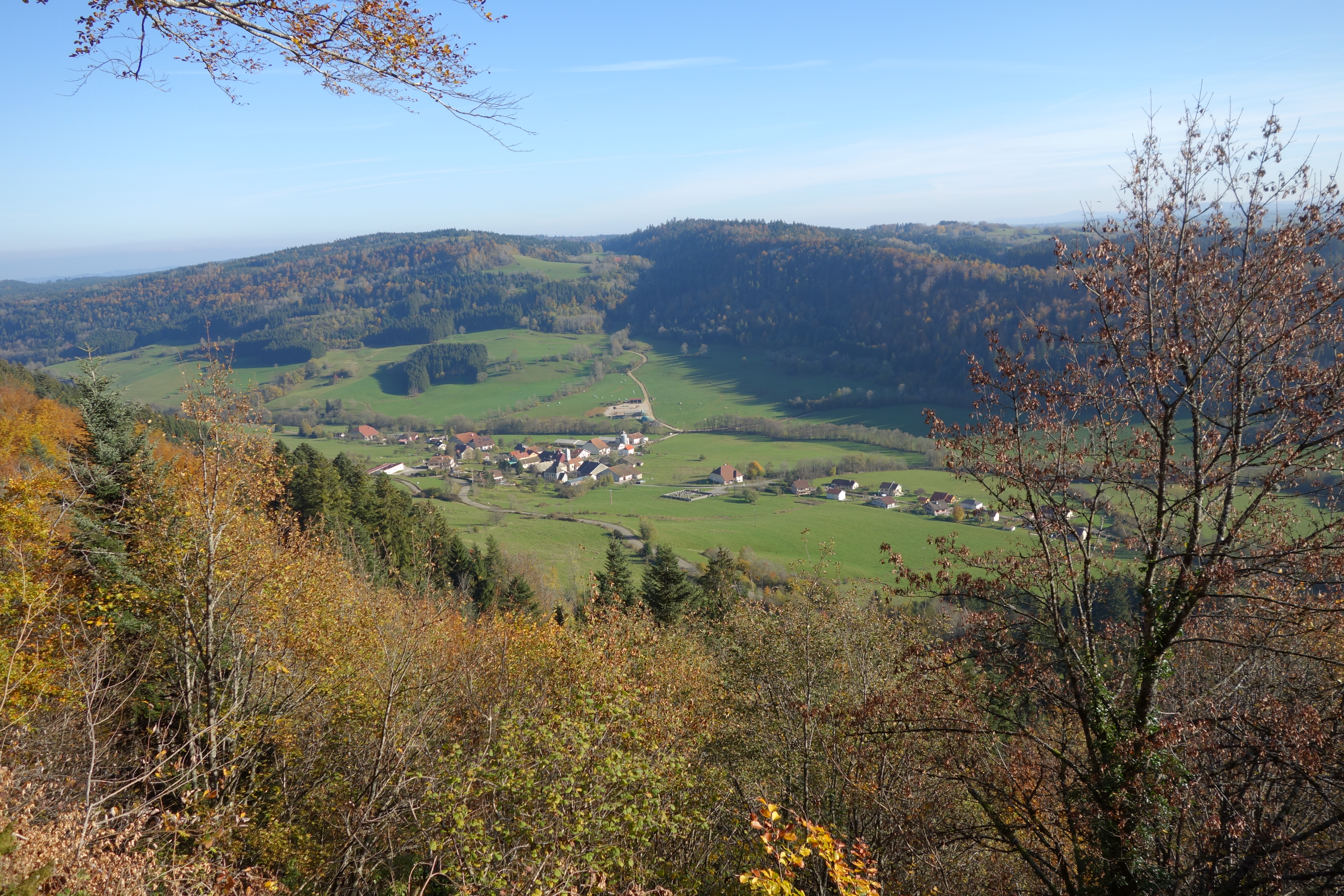
- A general view of Les Nans
- Location of Les Nans
- Location within France Location within Bourgogne-Franche-Comté
- Coordinates: 46°47′30″N 5°58′31″E
- Country: France
- Region: Bourgogne-Franche-Comté
- Department: Jura
- Arrondissement: Lons-le-Saunier
- Canton: Champagnole

Government
  - Mayor (2020–2026): Gilles Cicolini
- Area^{1}: 8.05 km^{2} (3.11 sq mi)
- Highest elevation: 904 m (2,966 ft)
- Lowest elevation: 635 m (2,083 ft)
- Population (2023): 100
  - Density: 12/km^{2} (32/sq mi)
- Time zone: UTC+01:00 (CET)
  - Summer (DST): UTC+02:00 (CEST)
- INSEE/Postal code: 39381 /39300
- ^{1} French Land Register data, which excludes lakes, ponds, glaciers > 1 km^{2} (0.386 sq mi or 247 acres) and river estuaries.

Les Nans (French pronunciation: [le nɑ̃]) is a commune in the Jura department in Bourgogne-Franche-Comté in eastern France.

== Population ==
Historical population
Year	Pop.	±% p.a.
1968	104	—
1975	89	−2.20%
1982	116	+3.86%
1990	100	−1.84%
1999	83	−2.05%
2007	89	+0.88%
2012	90	+0.22%
2017	91	+0.22%
2023	100	+1.58%
Source: INSEE

== See also ==
- Communes of the Jura department
