= Sirod =

- Commune
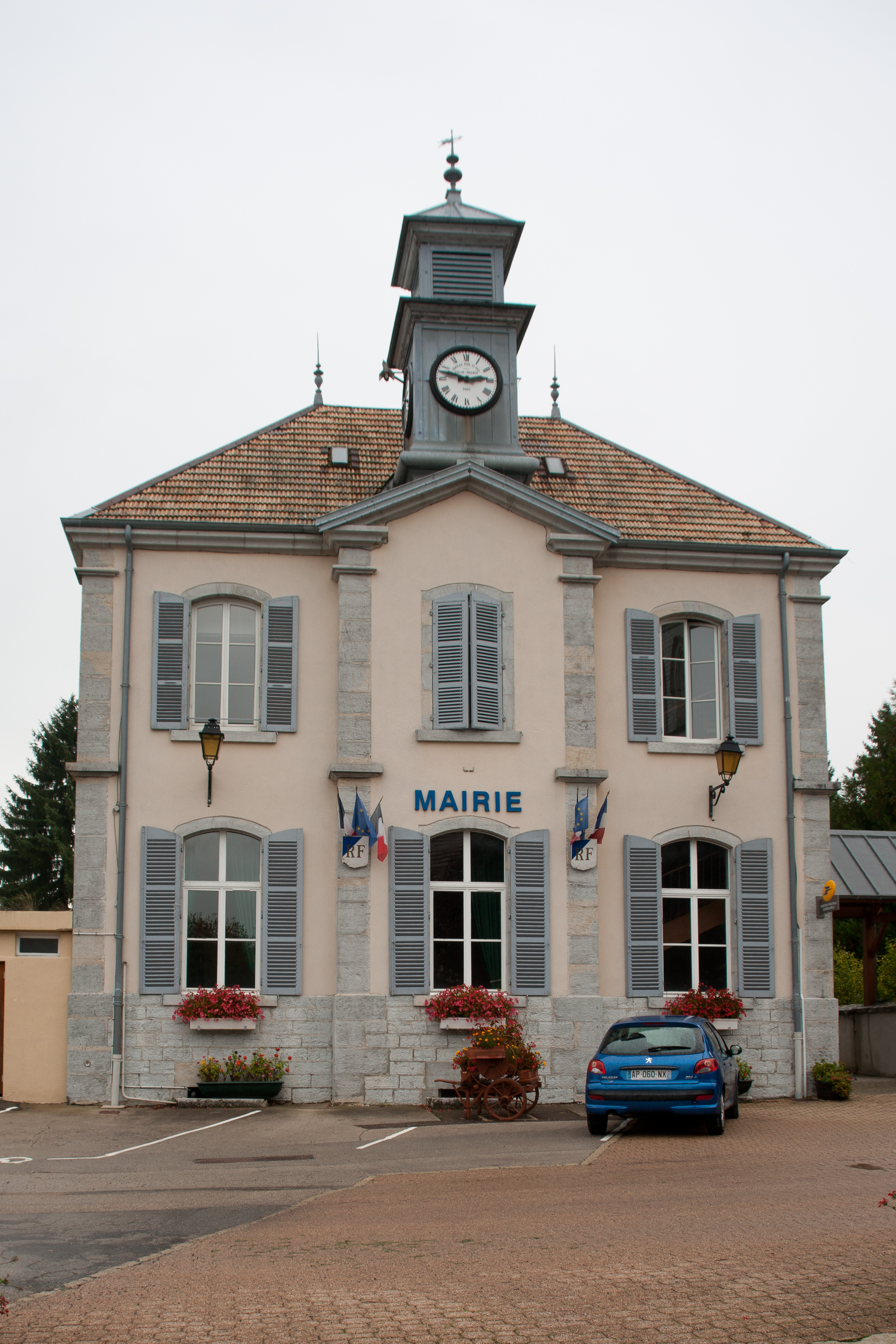
- Town hall
- Location of Sirod
- Location within France Location within Bourgogne-Franche-Comté
- Coordinates: 46°44′02″N 5°59′04″E
- Country: France
- Region: Bourgogne-Franche-Comté
- Department: Jura
- Arrondissement: Lons-le-Saunier
- Canton: Champagnole

Government
  - Mayor (2020–2026): Monique Villemagne
- Area^{1}: 16.10 km^{2} (6.22 sq mi)
- Highest elevation: 890 m (2,920 ft)
- Lowest elevation: 560 m (1,840 ft)
- Population (2023): 543
  - Density: 33.7/km^{2} (87.4/sq mi)
- Time zone: UTC+01:00 (CET)
  - Summer (DST): UTC+02:00 (CEST)
- INSEE/Postal code: 39517 /39300
- ^{1} French Land Register data, which excludes lakes, ponds, glaciers > 1 km^{2} (0.386 sq mi or 247 acres) and river estuaries.

Sirod (French pronunciation: [siʁo]; Arpitan: Serod) is a commune in the Jura department in the Bourgogne-Franche-Comté region in eastern France. In 1973 it absorbed the former commune Treffay.

== Population ==
Historical population
Year	Pop.	±% p.a.
1968	488	—
1975	518	+0.86%
1982	574	+1.48%
1990	539	−0.78%
1999	528	−0.23%
2007	553	+0.58%
2012	581	+0.99%
2017	524	−2.04%
2023	543	+0.60%
Source: INSEE

== See also ==
- Communes of the Jura department
