= Le Pasquier =

Commune in Bourgogne-Franche-Comté, France

- Commune
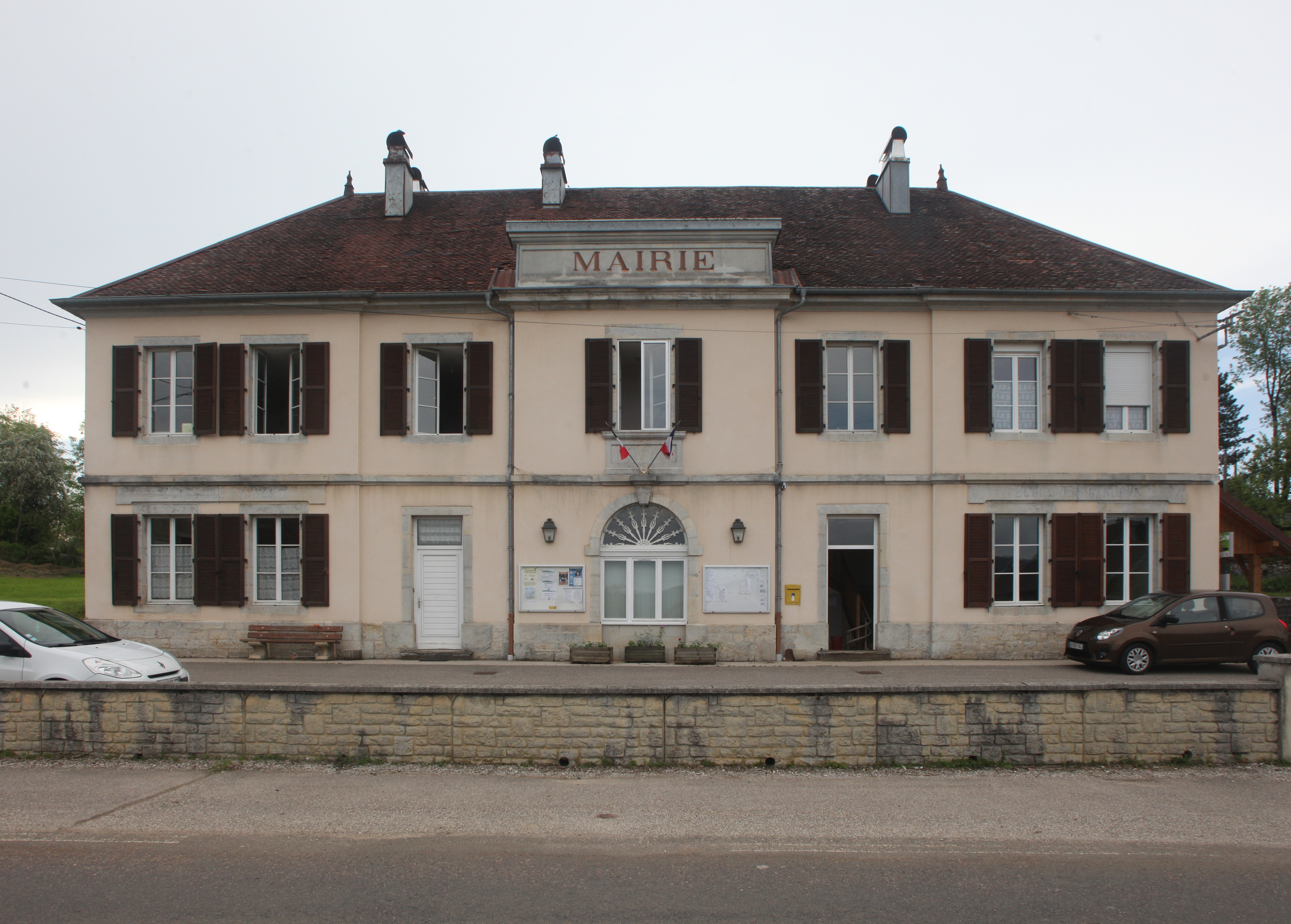
- The town hall in Le Pasquier
- Location of Le Pasquier
- Location within France Location within Bourgogne-Franche-Comté
- Coordinates: 46°48′05″N 5°54′20″E
- Country: France
- Region: Bourgogne-Franche-Comté
- Department: Jura
- Arrondissement: Lons-le-Saunier
- Canton: Champagnole

Government
  - Mayor (2020–2026): Denis Moreau
- Area^{1}: 7.75 km^{2} (2.99 sq mi)
- Highest elevation: 661 m (2,169 ft)
- Lowest elevation: 577 m (1,893 ft)
- Population (2023): 293
  - Density: 37.8/km^{2} (97.9/sq mi)
- Time zone: UTC+01:00 (CET)
  - Summer (DST): UTC+02:00 (CEST)
- INSEE/Postal code: 39406 /39300
- ^{1} French Land Register data, which excludes lakes, ponds, glaciers > 1 km^{2} (0.386 sq mi or 247 acres) and river estuaries.

Le Pasquier (French pronunciation: [lə paskje]; Arpitan: Lou Paiquier) is a commune in the Jura department in Bourgogne-Franche-Comté in eastern France.

== Population ==
Historical population
Year	Pop.	±% p.a.
1968	192	—
1975	183	−0.68%
1982	209	+1.92%
1990	238	+1.64%
1999	252	+0.64%
2007	249	−0.15%
2012	266	+1.33%
2017	251	−1.15%
2023	293	+2.61%
Source: INSEE

== See also ==
- Communes of the Jura department
