= Supt =

- Commune
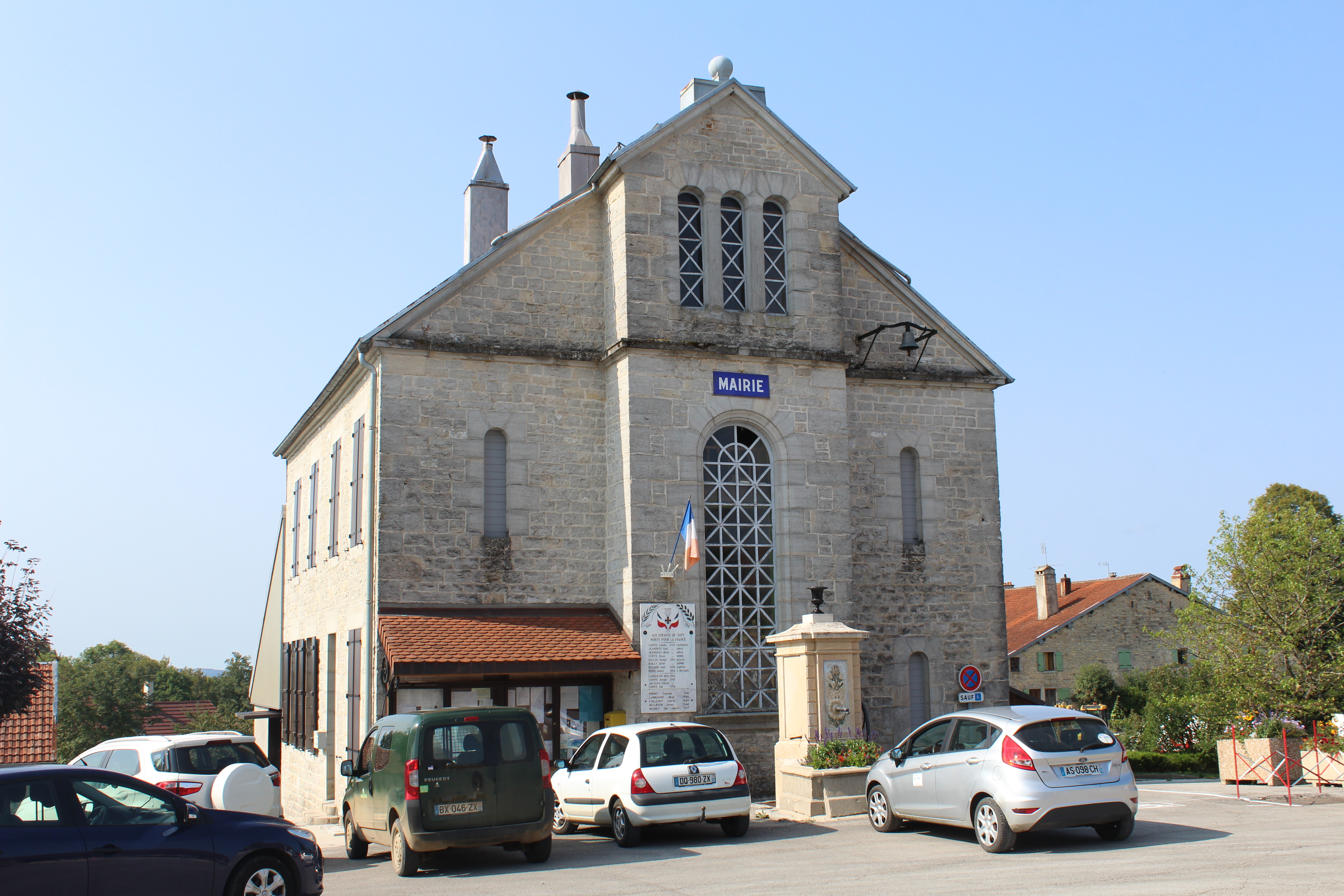
- The town hall in Supt
- Location of Supt
- Location within France Location within Bourgogne-Franche-Comté
- Coordinates: 46°51′02″N 5°57′32″E
- Country: France
- Region: Bourgogne-Franche-Comté
- Department: Jura
- Arrondissement: Lons-le-Saunier
- Canton: Champagnole

Government
  - Mayor (2020–2026): Évelyne Comte
- Area^{1}: 13.97 km^{2} (5.39 sq mi)
- Elevation: 666 m (2,185 ft)
- Highest elevation: 881 m (2,890 ft)
- Lowest elevation: 612 m (2,008 ft)
- Population (2023): 110
  - Density: 7.9/km^{2} (20/sq mi)
- Time zone: UTC+01:00 (CET)
  - Summer (DST): UTC+02:00 (CEST)
- INSEE/Postal code: 39522 /39300
- ^{1} French Land Register data, which excludes lakes, ponds, glaciers > 1 km^{2} (0.386 sq mi or 247 acres) and river estuaries.

Supt (French pronunciation: [sypt]) is a commune in the Jura department in the Bourgogne-Franche-Comté region in eastern France.

== Population ==
Historical population
Year	Pop.	±% p.a.
1968	137	—
1975	119	−1.99%
1982	120	+0.12%
1990	102	−2.01%
1999	107	+0.53%
2007	96	−1.35%
2012	112	+3.13%
2017	102	−1.85%
2023	110	+1.27%
Source: INSEE

== Points of interest ==
- Arboretum de Chevreuil

== See also ==
- Communes of the Jura department
