= Mont-sur-Monnet =

Commune in Bourgogne-Franche-Comté, France

- Commune
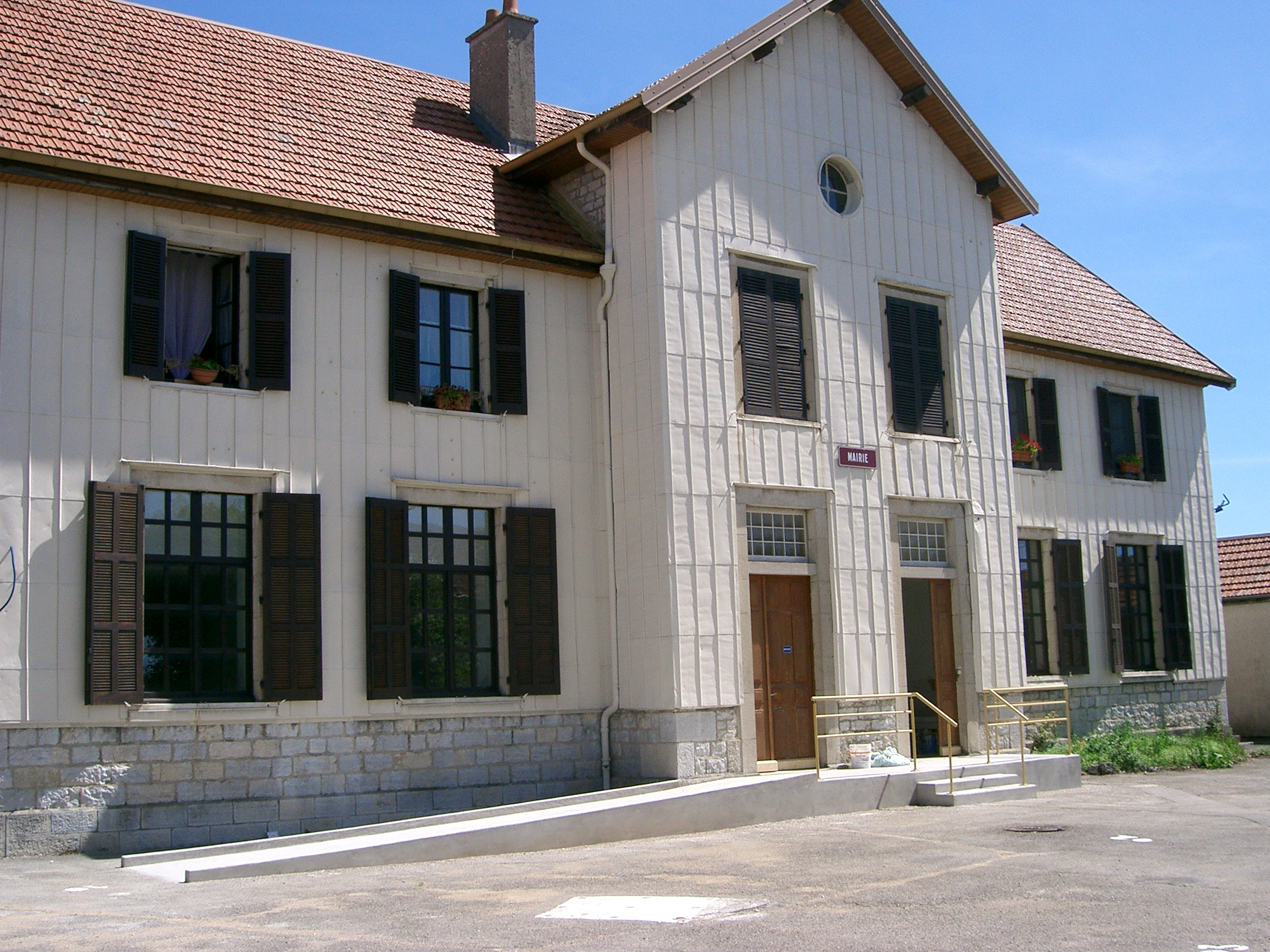
- Town hall/school
- Location of Mont-sur-Monnet
- Location within France Location within Bourgogne-Franche-Comté
- Coordinates: 46°42′35″N 5°50′16″E
- Country: France
- Region: Bourgogne-Franche-Comté
- Department: Jura
- Arrondissement: Lons-le-Saunier
- Canton: Champagnole

Government
  - Mayor (2020–2026): Sandrine Bonin
- Area^{1}: 19.93 km^{2} (7.70 sq mi)
- Highest elevation: 745 m (2,444 ft)
- Lowest elevation: 502 m (1,647 ft)
- Population (2023): 199
  - Density: 9.98/km^{2} (25.9/sq mi)
- Time zone: UTC+01:00 (CET)
  - Summer (DST): UTC+02:00 (CEST)
- INSEE/Postal code: 39366 /39300
- ^{1} French Land Register data, which excludes lakes, ponds, glaciers > 1 km^{2} (0.386 sq mi or 247 acres) and river estuaries.

Mont-sur-Monnet (French pronunciation: [mɔ̃ syʁ mɔnɛ], literally Mont on Monnet; Arpitan: Lou Mont) is a commune in the Jura department in Bourgogne-Franche-Comté in eastern France.

== Population ==
Historical population
Year	Pop.	±% p.a.
1968	177	—
1975	213	+2.68%
1982	194	−1.33%
1990	177	−1.14%
1999	173	−0.25%
2007	194	+1.44%
2012	234	+3.82%
2017	248	+1.17%
2023	199	−3.60%
Source: INSEE

== See also ==
- Communes of the Jura department
