= Le Vaudioux =

- Commune
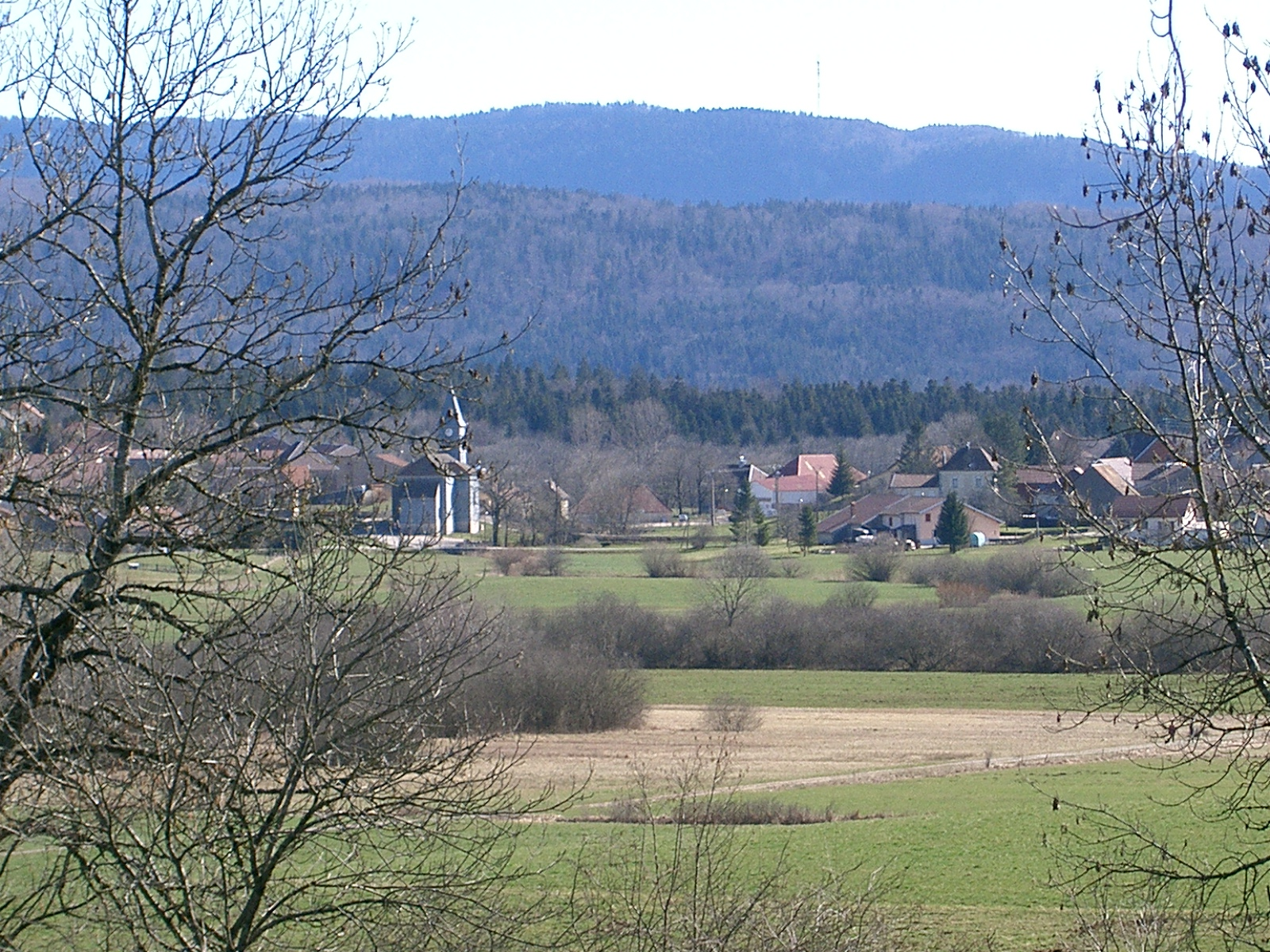
- A general view of Le Vaudioux
- Location of Le Vaudioux
- Location within France Location within Bourgogne-Franche-Comté
- Coordinates: 46°41′38″N 5°55′29″E
- Country: France
- Region: Bourgogne-Franche-Comté
- Department: Jura
- Arrondissement: Lons-le-Saunier
- Canton: Champagnole

Government
  - Mayor (2020–2026): Christian Drecq
- Area^{1}: 6.01 km^{2} (2.32 sq mi)
- Highest elevation: 848 m (2,782 ft)
- Lowest elevation: 540 m (1,770 ft)
- Population (2023): 168
  - Density: 28.0/km^{2} (72.4/sq mi)
- Time zone: UTC+01:00 (CET)
  - Summer (DST): UTC+02:00 (CEST)
- INSEE/Postal code: 39545 /39300
- ^{1} French Land Register data, which excludes lakes, ponds, glaciers > 1 km^{2} (0.386 sq mi or 247 acres) and river estuaries.

Le Vaudioux (French pronunciation: [lə vodju]; Arpitan: Lou Vadiu) is a commune in the Jura department in Bourgogne-Franche-Comté in eastern France.

== Population ==
Historical population
Year	Pop.	±% p.a.
1968	115	—
1975	123	+0.97%
1982	145	+2.38%
1990	147	+0.17%
1999	168	+1.49%
2007	162	−0.45%
2012	161	−0.12%
2017	175	+1.68%
2023	168	−0.68%
Source: INSEE

== See also ==
- Communes of the Jura department
