= Le Latet =

Commune in Bourgogne-Franche-Comté, France

- Commune
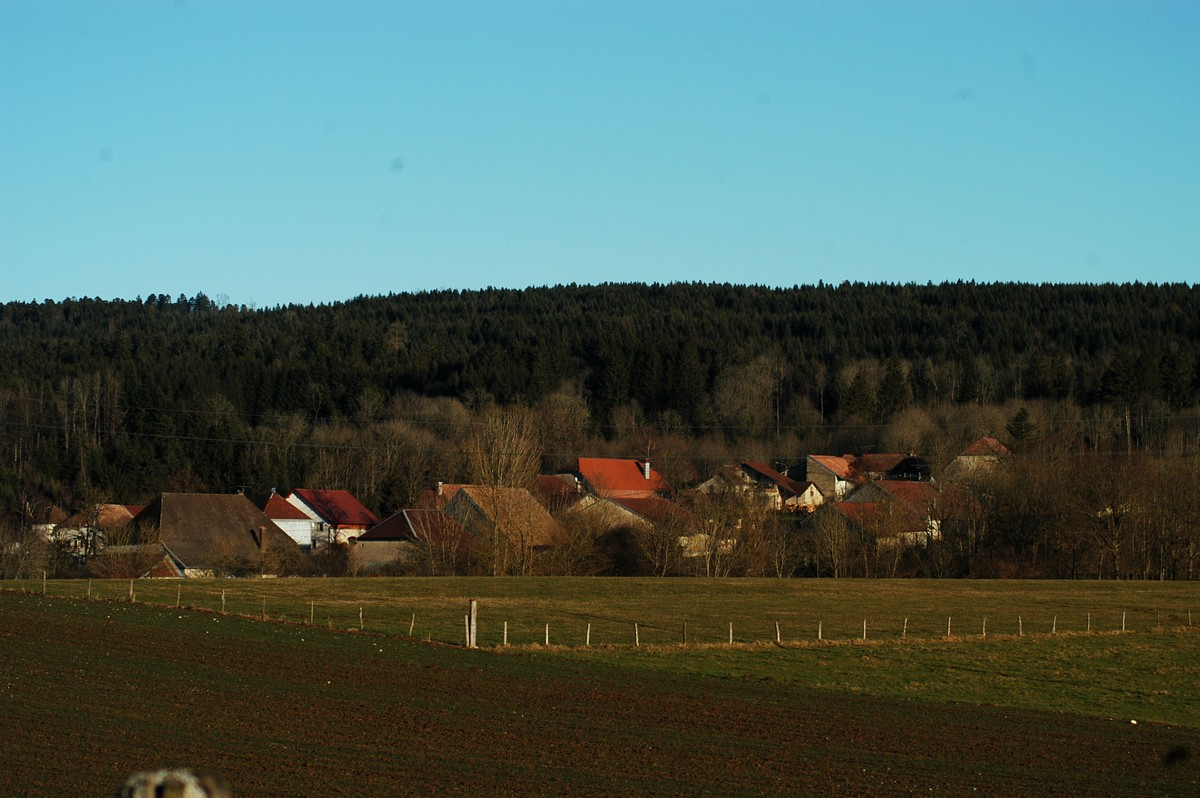
- A general view of Le Latet
- Location of Le Latet
- Location within France Location within Bourgogne-Franche-Comté
- Coordinates: 46°48′19″N 5°56′09″E
- Country: France
- Region: Bourgogne-Franche-Comté
- Department: Jura
- Arrondissement: Lons-le-Saunier
- Canton: Champagnole

Government
  - Mayor (2020–2026): Fabien Petetin
- Area^{1}: 4.02 km^{2} (1.55 sq mi)
- Highest elevation: 800 m (2,600 ft)
- Lowest elevation: 586 m (1,923 ft)
- Population (2023): 91
  - Density: 23/km^{2} (59/sq mi)
- Time zone: UTC+01:00 (CET)
  - Summer (DST): UTC+02:00 (CEST)
- INSEE/Postal code: 39281 /39300
- ^{1} French Land Register data, which excludes lakes, ponds, glaciers > 1 km^{2} (0.386 sq mi or 247 acres) and river estuaries.

Le Latet (French pronunciation: [lə latɛ]) is a commune in the Jura department in Bourgogne-Franche-Comté in eastern France.

== Population ==
Historical population
| Year | Pop. | ±% p.a. |
|---|---|---|
| 1968 | 73 | — |
| 1975 | 64 | −1.86% |
| 1982 | 71 | +1.49% |
| 1990 | 73 | +0.35% |
| 1999 | 63 | −1.62% |
| 2007 | 75 | +2.20% |
| 2012 | 77 | +0.53% |
| 2017 | 81 | +1.02% |
| 2023 | 91 | +1.96% |
Source: INSEE

== See also ==
- Communes of the Jura department
