= Lent, Jura =

Commune in Bourgogne-Franche-Comté, France

Lent
- Commune
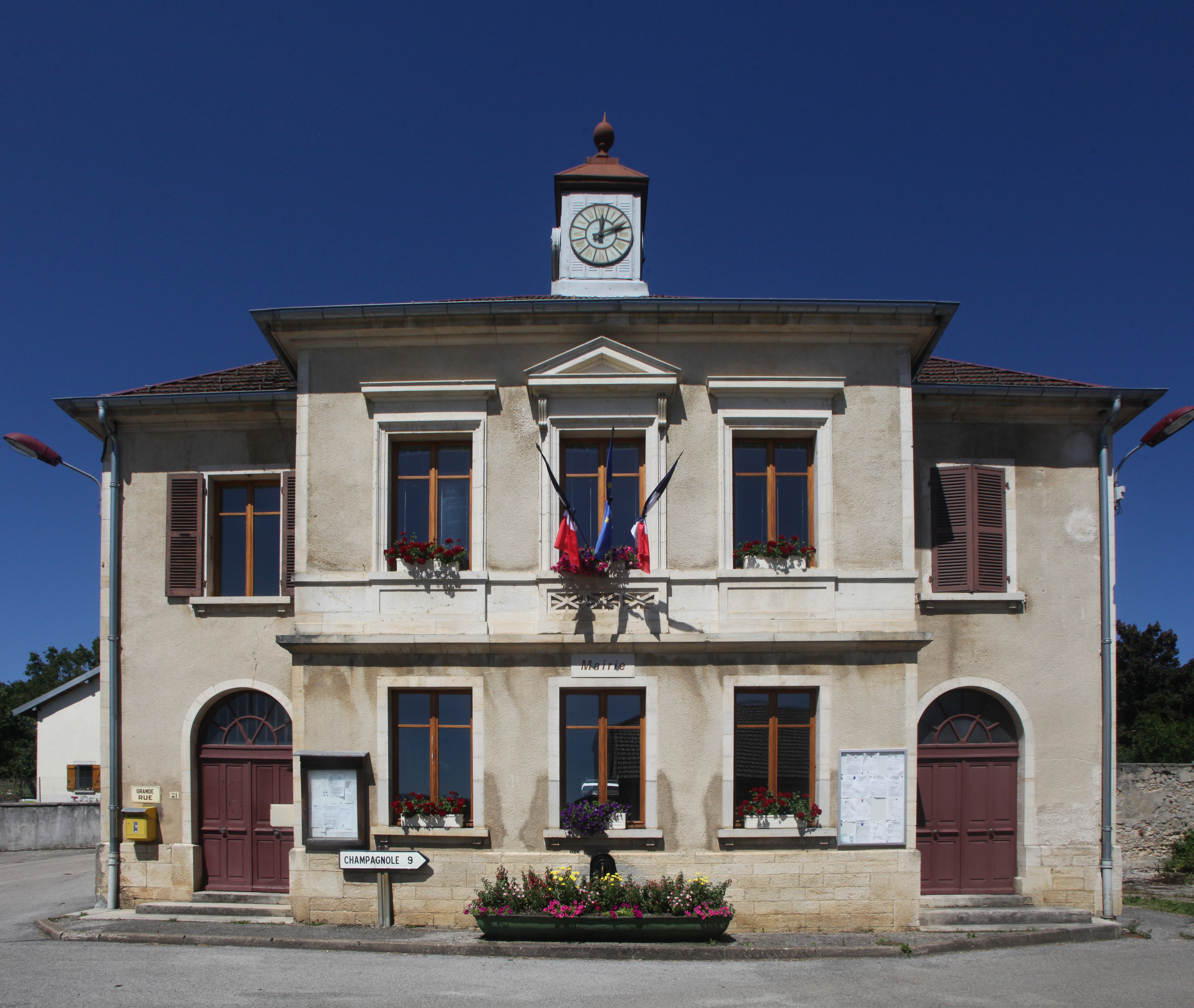
- The town hall in Lent
- Location of Lent
- Location within France Location within Bourgogne-Franche-Comté
- Coordinates: 46°44′41″N 5°58′46″E
- Country: France
- Region: Bourgogne-Franche-Comté
- Department: Jura
- Arrondissement: Lons-le-Saunier
- Canton: Champagnole

Government
  - Mayor (2020–2026): Michel Bonnet
- Area^{1}: 4.11 km^{2} (1.59 sq mi)
- Highest elevation: 808 m (2,651 ft)
- Lowest elevation: 625 m (2,051 ft)
- Population (2023): 128
  - Density: 31.1/km^{2} (80.7/sq mi)
- Time zone: UTC+01:00 (CET)
  - Summer (DST): UTC+02:00 (CEST)
- INSEE/Postal code: 39292 /39300
- ^{1} French Land Register data, which excludes lakes, ponds, glaciers > 1 km^{2} (0.386 sq mi or 247 acres) and river estuaries.

Lent (French pronunciation: [lɑ̃]) is a commune in the Jura department in Bourgogne-Franche-Comté in eastern France.

== Population ==
Historical population
Year	Pop.	±% p.a.
1968	77	—
1975	89	+2.09%
1982	137	+6.36%
1990	149	+1.06%
1999	137	−0.93%
2007	125	−1.14%
2012	136	+1.70%
2017	150	+1.98%
2023	128	−2.61%
Source: INSEE

== See also ==
- Communes of the Jura department
