= Valempoulières =

- Commune
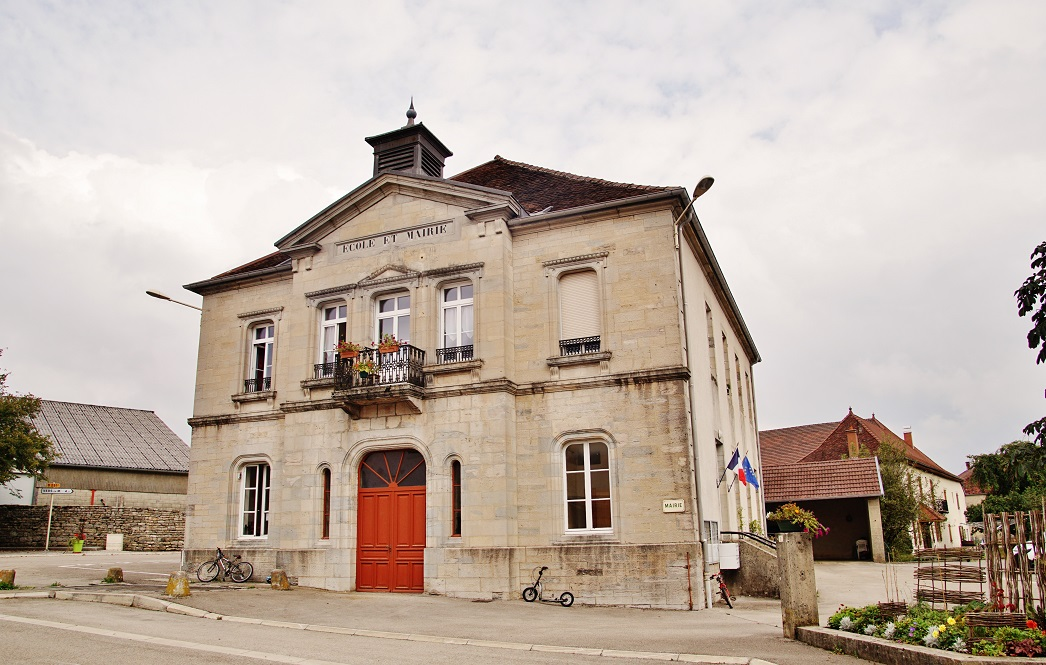
- The town hall in Valempoulières
- Location of Valempoulières
- Location within France Location within Bourgogne-Franche-Comté
- Coordinates: 46°49′36″N 5°51′51″E
- Country: France
- Region: Bourgogne-Franche-Comté
- Department: Jura
- Arrondissement: Lons-le-Saunier
- Canton: Champagnole

Government
  - Mayor (2020–2026): Alain Gavignet
- Area^{1}: 16.25 km^{2} (6.27 sq mi)
- Highest elevation: 766 m (2,513 ft)
- Lowest elevation: 610 m (2,000 ft)
- Population (2023): 213
  - Density: 13.1/km^{2} (33.9/sq mi)
- Time zone: UTC+01:00 (CET)
  - Summer (DST): UTC+02:00 (CEST)
- INSEE/Postal code: 39540 /39300
- ^{1} French Land Register data, which excludes lakes, ponds, glaciers > 1 km^{2} (0.386 sq mi or 247 acres) and river estuaries.

Valempoulières (French pronunciation: [valɑ̃puljɛʁ]; Arpitan: Valempoulirës) is a commune in the Jura department in the Bourgogne-Franche-Comté region in eastern France.

== Population ==
Historical population
Year	Pop.	±% p.a.
1968	208	—
1975	192	−1.14%
1982	184	−0.61%
1990	175	−0.62%
1999	172	−0.19%
2007	203	+2.09%
2012	216	+1.25%
2017	193	−2.23%
2023	213	+1.66%
Source: INSEE

== See also ==
- Communes of the Jura department
