= Le Larderet =

Commune in Bourgogne-Franche-Comté, France

- Commune
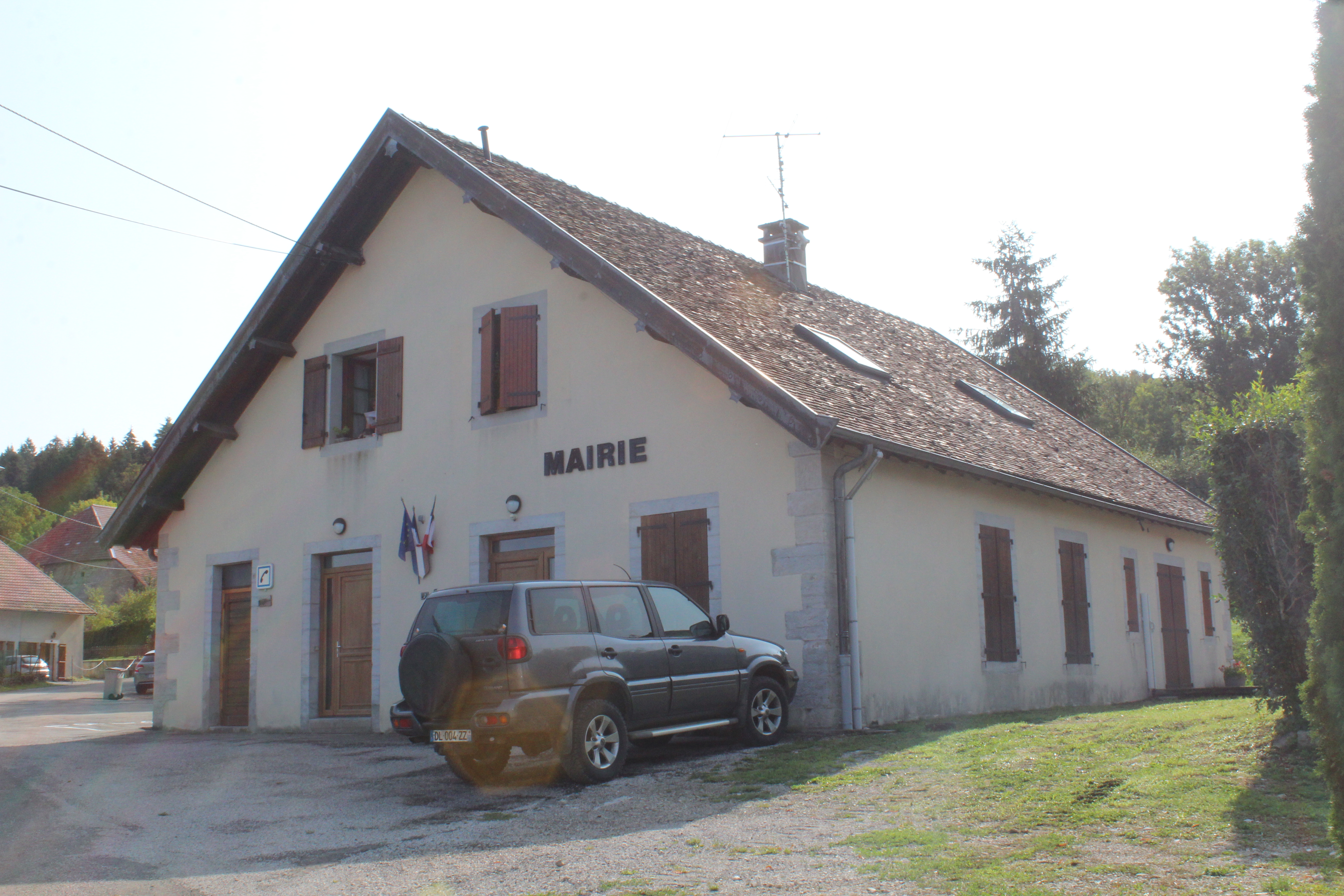
- The town hall in Le Larderet
- Location of Le Larderet
- Location within France Location within Bourgogne-Franche-Comté
- Coordinates: 46°49′03″N 5°56′55″E
- Country: France
- Region: Bourgogne-Franche-Comté
- Department: Jura
- Arrondissement: Lons-le-Saunier
- Canton: Champagnole

Government
  - Mayor (2020–2026): Jacky Dole
- Area^{1}: 6.31 km^{2} (2.44 sq mi)
- Highest elevation: 796 m (2,612 ft)
- Lowest elevation: 590 m (1,940 ft)
- Population (2023): 49
  - Density: 7.8/km^{2} (20/sq mi)
- Time zone: UTC+01:00 (CET)
  - Summer (DST): UTC+02:00 (CEST)
- INSEE/Postal code: 39277 /39300
- ^{1} French Land Register data, which excludes lakes, ponds, glaciers > 1 km^{2} (0.386 sq mi or 247 acres) and river estuaries.

Le Larderet (French pronunciation: [lə laʁdəʁɛ]; Arpitan: Ladgeret) is a commune in the Jura department in Bourgogne-Franche-Comté in eastern France.

== Population ==
Historical population
Year	Pop.	±% p.a.
1968	60	—
1975	52	−2.02%
1982	48	−1.14%
1990	63	+3.46%
1999	72	+1.49%
2007	67	−0.90%
2012	90	+6.08%
2017	74	−3.84%
2023	49	−6.64%
Source: INSEE

== See also ==
- Communes of the Jura department
