= Loulle =

Commune in Bourgogne-Franche-Comté, France

- Commune
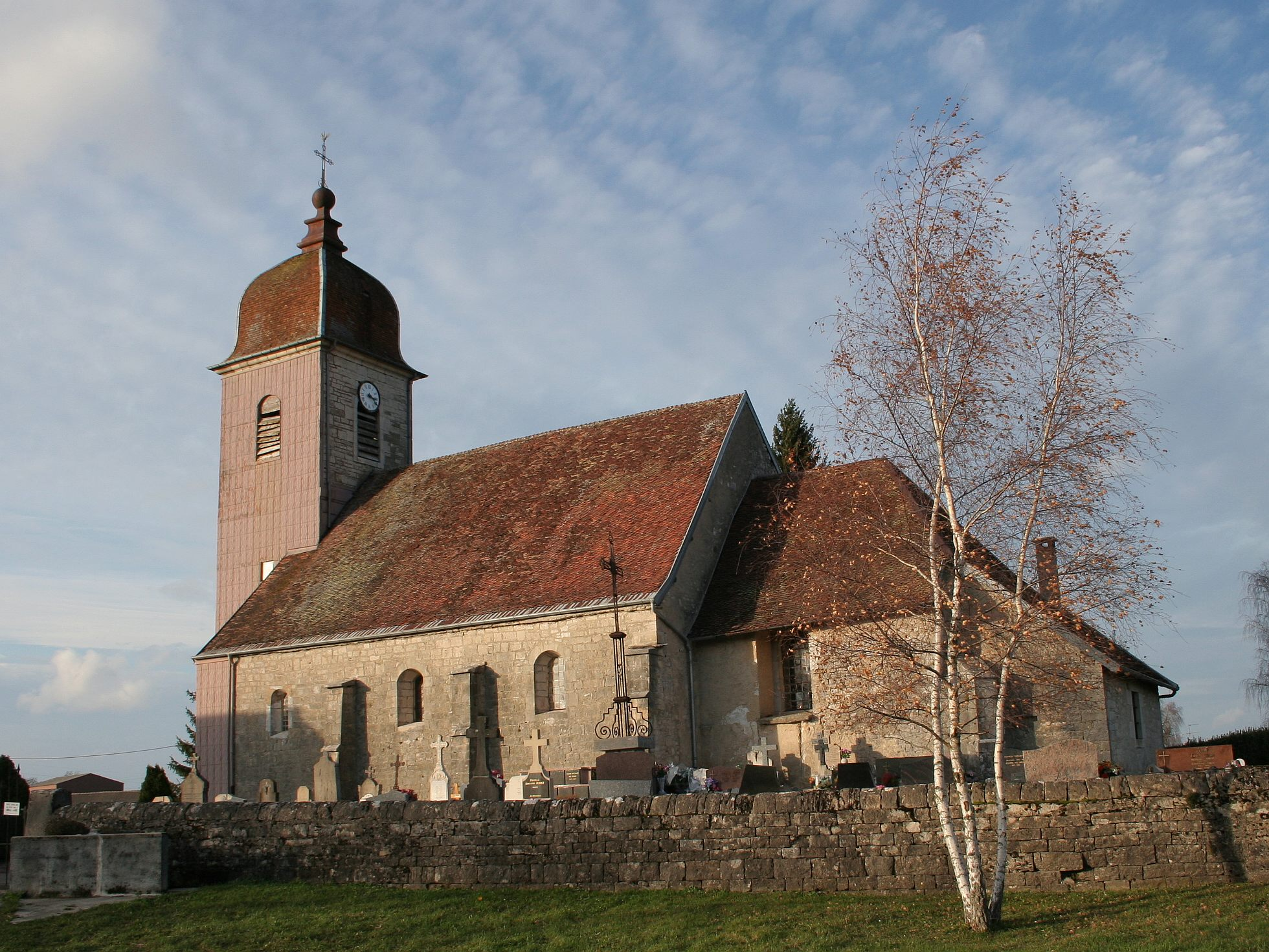
- The church in Loulle
- Location of Loulle
- Location within France Location within Bourgogne-Franche-Comté
- Coordinates: 46°42′32″N 5°52′56″E
- Country: France
- Region: Bourgogne-Franche-Comté
- Department: Jura
- Arrondissement: Lons-le-Saunier
- Canton: Champagnole

Government
  - Mayor (2024–2026): Philippe Dubois
- Area^{1}: 10.90 km^{2} (4.21 sq mi)
- Highest elevation: 776 m (2,546 ft)
- Lowest elevation: 610 m (2,000 ft)
- Population (2023): 176
  - Density: 16.1/km^{2} (41.8/sq mi)
- Time zone: UTC+01:00 (CET)
  - Summer (DST): UTC+02:00 (CEST)
- INSEE/Postal code: 39301 /39300
- ^{1} French Land Register data, which excludes lakes, ponds, glaciers > 1 km^{2} (0.386 sq mi or 247 acres) and river estuaries.

Loulle (French pronunciation: [lul]; Arpitan: Lula) is a commune in the Jura department in region of Bourgogne-Franche-Comté in eastern France.

== Population ==
Historical population
Year	Pop.	±% p.a.
1968	114	—
1975	105	−1.17%
1982	160	+6.20%
1990	169	+0.69%
1999	177	+0.52%
2007	171	−0.43%
2012	173	+0.23%
2017	172	−0.12%
2023	176	+0.38%
Source: INSEE

== Dinosaur Trails ==
In 2004 a remarkable set of well-preserved dinosaur tracks were discovered in a quarry just outside Loulle. The tracks form a dense network of trails belonging mainly to sauropods but with other species represented. Many of the imprints have been painted by researchers from the University of Lyon to indicate the tracks from individual animals. The caked muddy surface over which the dinosaurs walked is also well preserved in the rock.

The site is open to the public (no admission charged) and is on a sharp bend on the main road between Loulle and Nye.

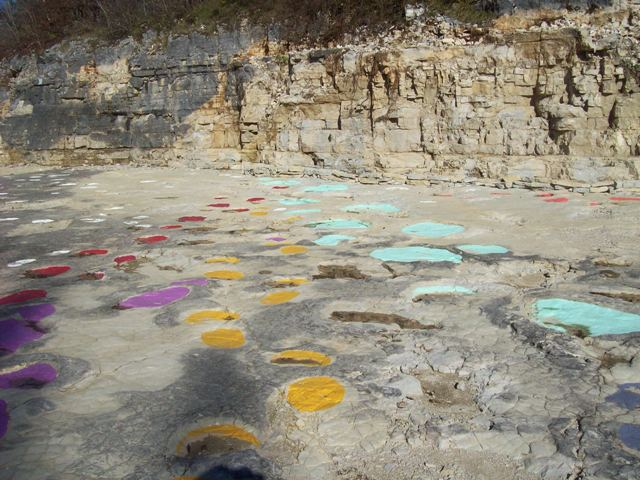
Dinosaur trails

== See also ==
- Communes of the Jura department
