= Arboretum de Chevreuil =

Arboretum in Franche-Comté, France

Coordinates: 46.847°N 6.007°E

The Arboretum de Chevreuil is an arboretum located in the heart of the Forêt Domaniale de la Joux (2,652 hectares) on the route des sapins east of Supt, Jura, Franche-Comté, France. It is open daily without charge.

The arboretum is located near the Maison Forestière (Forest House), and is managed by the Office National des Forêts. It contains 43 species of conifers including the Sapin Président de la Joux, a magnificent specimen that is over two centuries old, with a height of 45 meters and a diameter of 1.2 meters.

== See also ==
- List of botanical gardens in France
