= Moutoux =

Commune in Bourgogne-Franche-Comté, France

- Commune
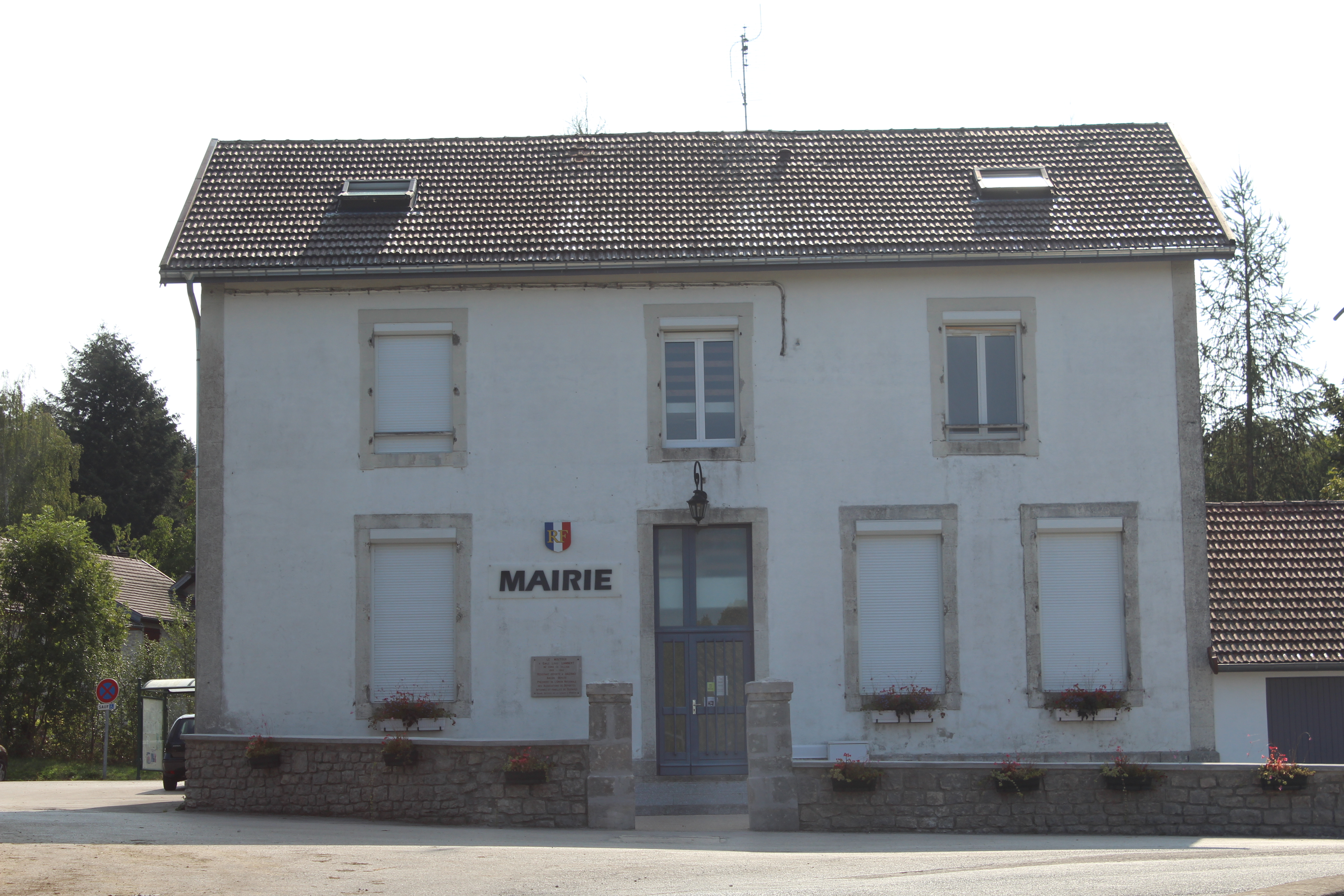
- The town hall in Moutoux
- Location of Moutoux
- Location within France Location within Bourgogne-Franche-Comté
- Coordinates: 46°47′31″N 5°56′27″E
- Country: France
- Region: Bourgogne-Franche-Comté
- Department: Jura
- Arrondissement: Lons-le-Saunier
- Canton: Champagnole

Government
  - Mayor (2020–2026): Jacques Hugon
- Area^{1}: 4.27 km^{2} (1.65 sq mi)
- Highest elevation: 870 m (2,850 ft)
- Lowest elevation: 585 m (1,919 ft)
- Population (2023): 76
  - Density: 18/km^{2} (46/sq mi)
- Time zone: UTC+01:00 (CET)
  - Summer (DST): UTC+02:00 (CEST)
- INSEE/Postal code: 39376 /39300
- ^{1} French Land Register data, which excludes lakes, ponds, glaciers > 1 km^{2} (0.386 sq mi or 247 acres) and river estuaries.

Moutoux (French pronunciation: [mutu]) is a commune in the Jura department in Bourgogne-Franche-Comté in eastern France.

== Population ==
Historical population
Year	Pop.	±% p.a.
1968	36	—
1975	34	−0.81%
1982	60	+8.45%
1990	67	+1.39%
1999	58	−1.59%
2007	58	+0.00%
2012	64	+1.99%
2017	72	+2.38%
2023	76	+0.91%
Source: INSEE

== See also ==
- Communes of the Jura department
