= Ardon, Jura =

Commune in Bourgogne-Franche-Comté, France

Ardon
- Commune
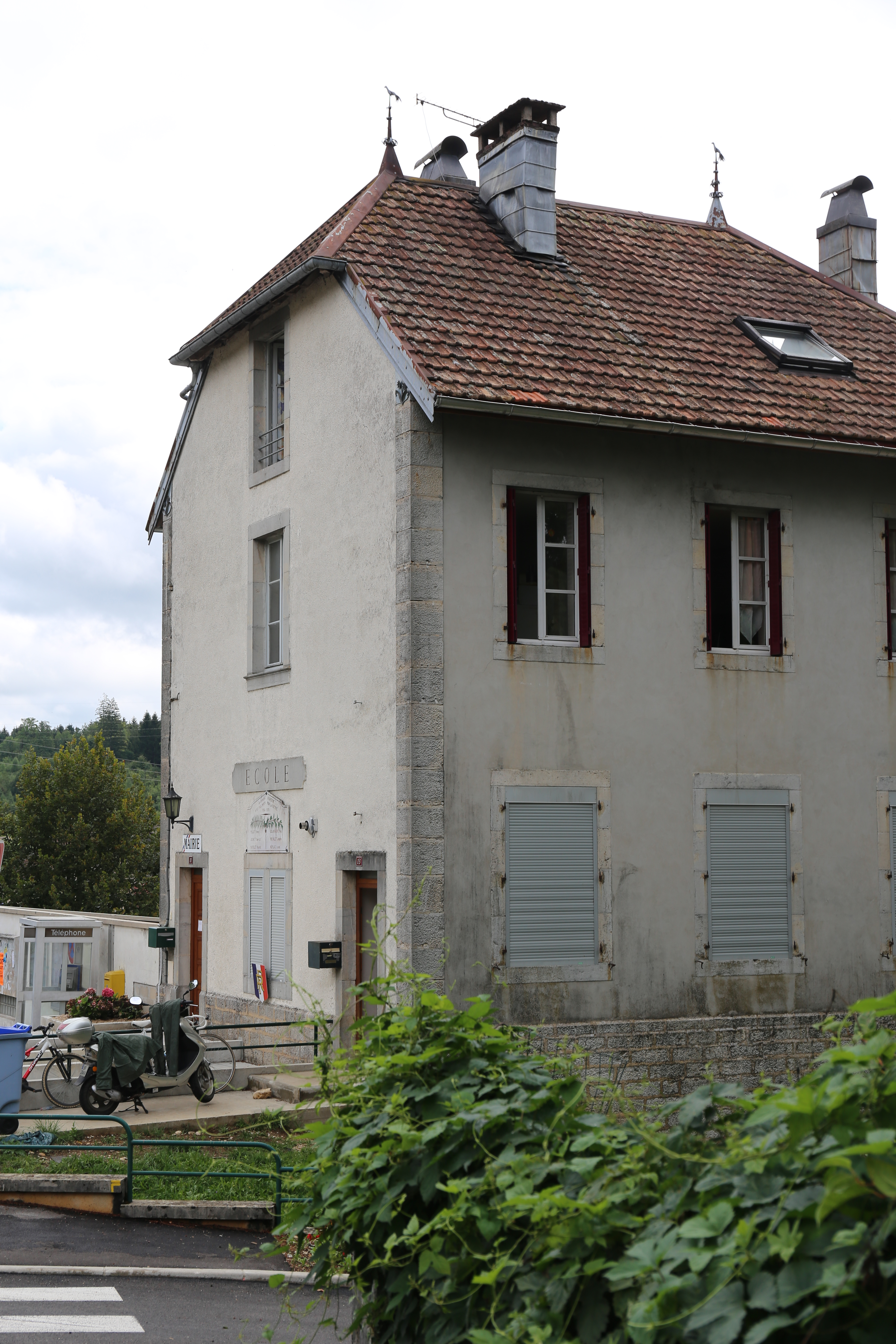
- The town hall in Ardon
- Location of Ardon
- Location within France Location within Bourgogne-Franche-Comté
- Coordinates: 46°46′28″N 5°53′20″E
- Country: France
- Region: Bourgogne-Franche-Comté
- Department: Jura
- Arrondissement: Lons-le-Saunier
- Canton: Champagnole

Government
  - Mayor (2020–2026): Chantal Martin
- Area^{1}: 5.04 km^{2} (1.95 sq mi)
- Highest elevation: 637 m (2,090 ft)
- Lowest elevation: 525 m (1,722 ft)
- Population (2023): 109
  - Density: 21.6/km^{2} (56.0/sq mi)
- Time zone: UTC+01:00 (CET)
  - Summer (DST): UTC+02:00 (CEST)
- INSEE/Postal code: 39015 /39300
- ^{1} French Land Register data, which excludes lakes, ponds, glaciers > 1 km^{2} (0.386 sq mi or 247 acres) and river estuaries.

Ardon (French pronunciation: [aʁdɔ̃]; Arpitan: Nadjon) is a commune in the Jura department in the region of Bourgogne-Franche-Comté in eastern France.

== Population ==
Historical population
Year	Pop.	±% p.a.
1968	134	—
1975	147	+1.33%
1982	110	−4.06%
1990	148	+3.78%
1999	141	−0.54%
2007	118	−2.20%
2012	128	+1.64%
2017	115	−2.12%
2023	109	−0.89%
Source: INSEE

== See also ==
- Communes of the Jura department
