= Crotenay =

Commune in Bourgogne-Franche-Comté, France

- Commune
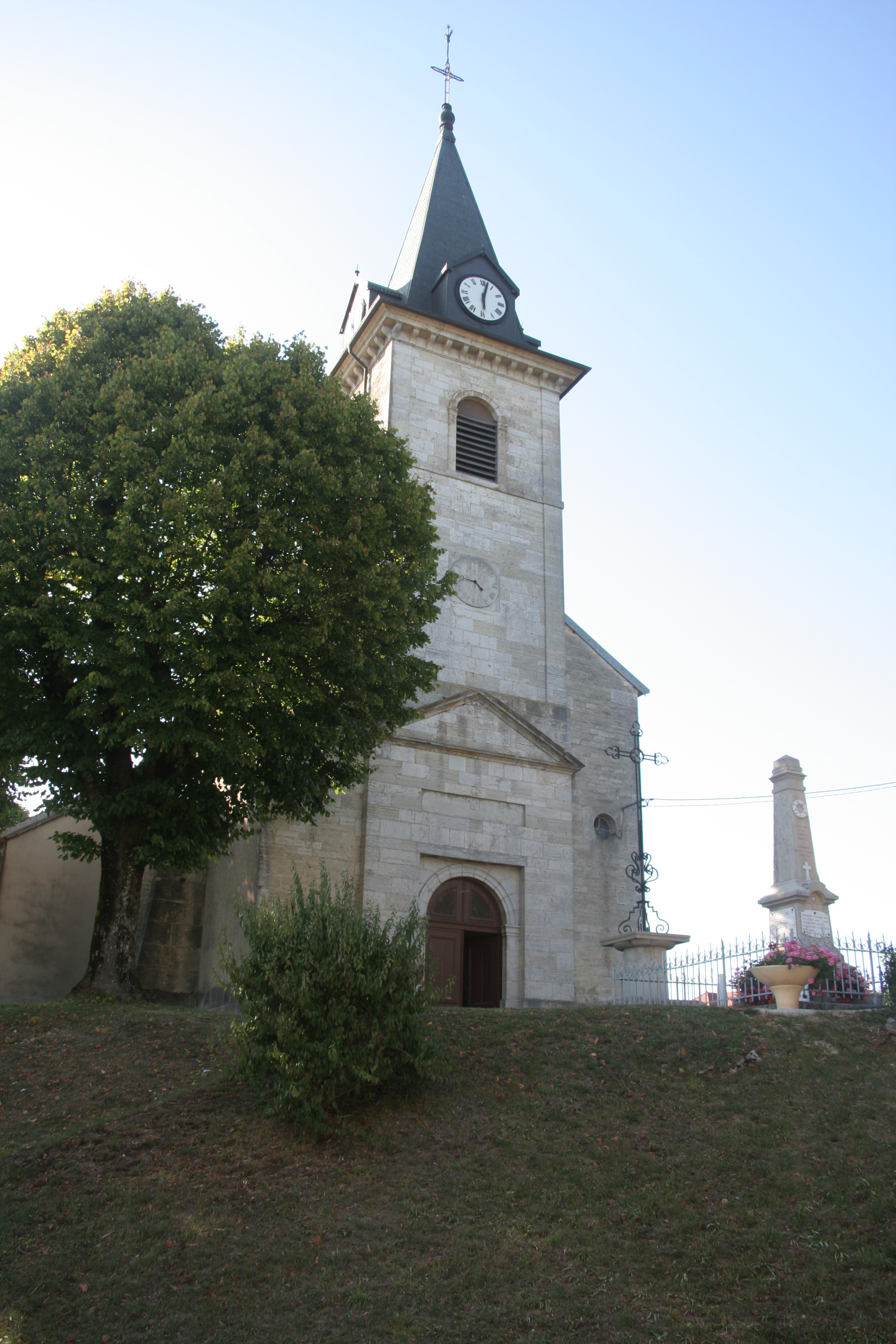
- The church and war memorial in Crotenay

- Coat of arms
- Location of Crotenay
- Location within France Location within Bourgogne-Franche-Comté
- Coordinates: 46°45′10″N 5°48′52″E
- Country: France
- Region: Bourgogne-Franche-Comté
- Department: Jura
- Arrondissement: Lons-le-Saunier
- Canton: Champagnole

Government
  - Mayor (2020–2026): Olivier Cavallin
- Area^{1}: 11.61 km^{2} (4.48 sq mi)
- Highest elevation: 642 m (2,106 ft)
- Lowest elevation: 469 m (1,539 ft)
- Population (2023): 610
  - Density: 53/km^{2} (140/sq mi)
- Time zone: UTC+01:00 (CET)
  - Summer (DST): UTC+02:00 (CEST)
- INSEE/Postal code: 39183 /39300
- ^{1} French Land Register data, which excludes lakes, ponds, glaciers > 1 km^{2} (0.386 sq mi or 247 acres) and river estuaries.

Crotenay (French pronunciation: [kʁɔtnɛ]; Arpitan: Croutenay) is a commune in the Jura department in Bourgogne-Franche-Comté in eastern France.

== Population ==
Historical population
Year	Pop.	±% p.a.
1968	373	—
1975	496	+4.16%
1982	582	+2.31%
1990	579	−0.06%
1999	598	+0.36%
2007	635	+0.75%
2012	670	+1.08%
2017	640	−0.91%
2023	610	−0.80%
Source: INSEE

== See also ==
- Communes of the Jura department
