= Montigny-sur-l'Ain =

Commune in Bourgogne-Franche-Comté, France

- Commune
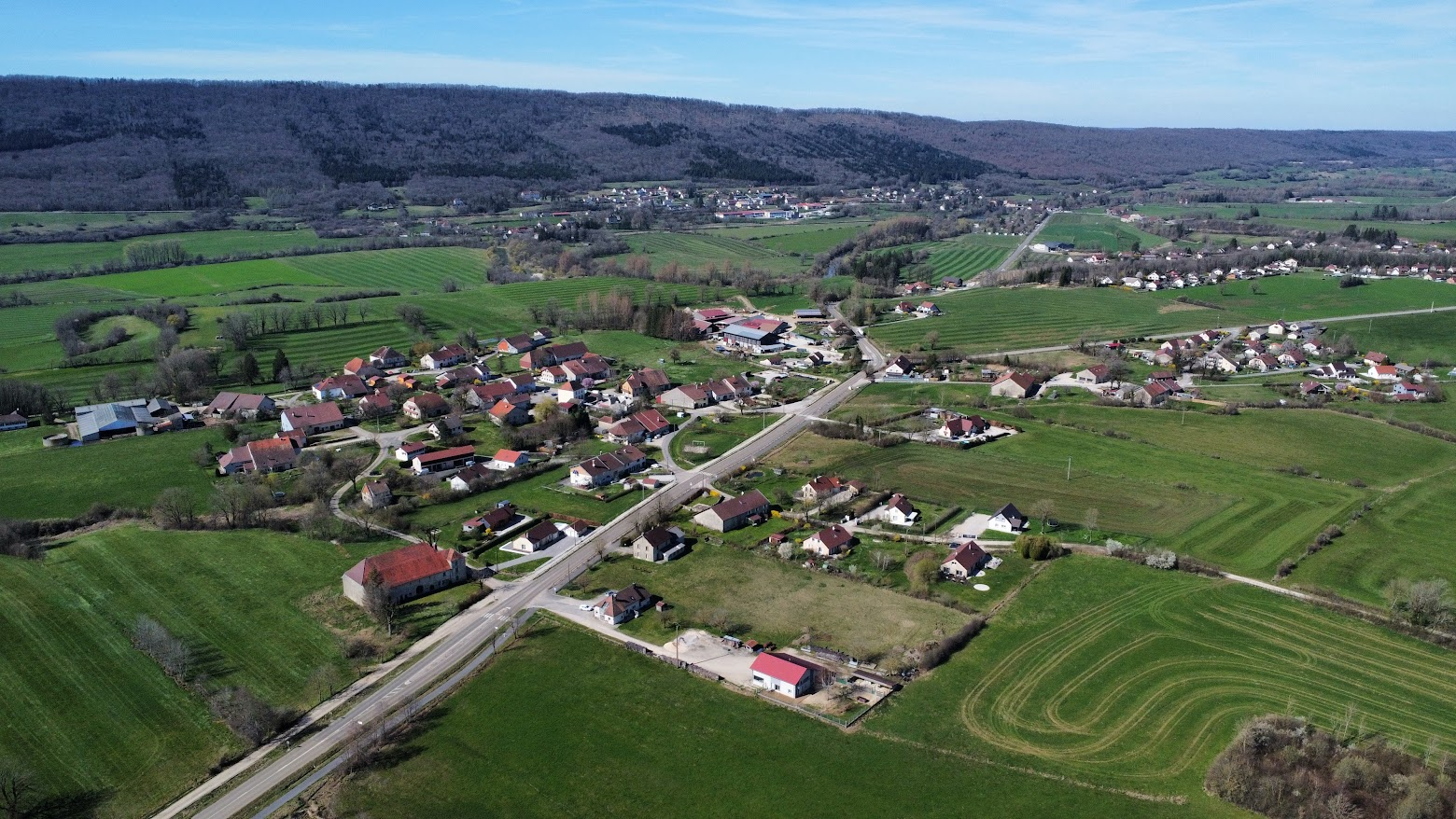
- Aerial view of Montigny-sur-l'Ain
- Location of Montigny-sur-l'Ain
- Location within France Location within Bourgogne-Franche-Comté
- Coordinates: 46°42′39″N 5°47′10″E
- Country: France
- Region: Bourgogne-Franche-Comté
- Department: Jura
- Arrondissement: Lons-le-Saunier
- Canton: Champagnole

Government
  - Mayor (2020–2026): Rémi Hugon
- Area^{1}: 7.99 km^{2} (3.08 sq mi)
- Highest elevation: 661 m (2,169 ft)
- Lowest elevation: 460 m (1,510 ft)
- Population (2023): 217
  - Density: 27.2/km^{2} (70.3/sq mi)
- Time zone: UTC+01:00 (CET)
  - Summer (DST): UTC+02:00 (CEST)
- INSEE/Postal code: 39356 /39300
- ^{1} French Land Register data, which excludes lakes, ponds, glaciers > 1 km^{2} (0.386 sq mi or 247 acres) and river estuaries.

Montigny-sur-l'Ain (French pronunciation: [mɔ̃tiɲi syʁ lɛ̃], literally Montigny on the Ain) is a commune in the Jura department in Bourgogne-Franche-Comté in eastern France.

== See also ==
- Communes of the Jura department
