= Canton of Champagnole =

Coordinates: 46.75°N 5.91°E

The canton of Champagnole is an administrative division of the Jura department, eastern France. Its borders were not modified at the French canton reorganisation which came into effect in March 2015. Its seat is in Champagnole.

It consists of the following communes:

1. Andelot-en-Montagne
2. Ardon
3. Bourg-de-Sirod
4. Champagnole
5. Chapois
6. Châtelneuf
7. Cize
8. Crotenay
9. Équevillon
10. Le Larderet
11. Le Latet
12. Lent
13. Loulle
14. Monnet-la-Ville
15. Montigny-sur-l'Ain
16. Montrond
17. Mont-sur-Monnet
18. Moutoux
19. Les Nans
20. Ney
21. Le Pasquier
22. Pillemoine
23. Pont-du-Navoy
24. Saint-Germain-en-Montagne
25. Sapois
26. Sirod
27. Supt
28. Syam
29. Valempoulières
30. Vannoz
31. Le Vaudioux
32. Vers-en-Montagne
