= Montrond, Jura =

Commune in Bourgogne-Franche-Comté, France

Montrond
- Commune
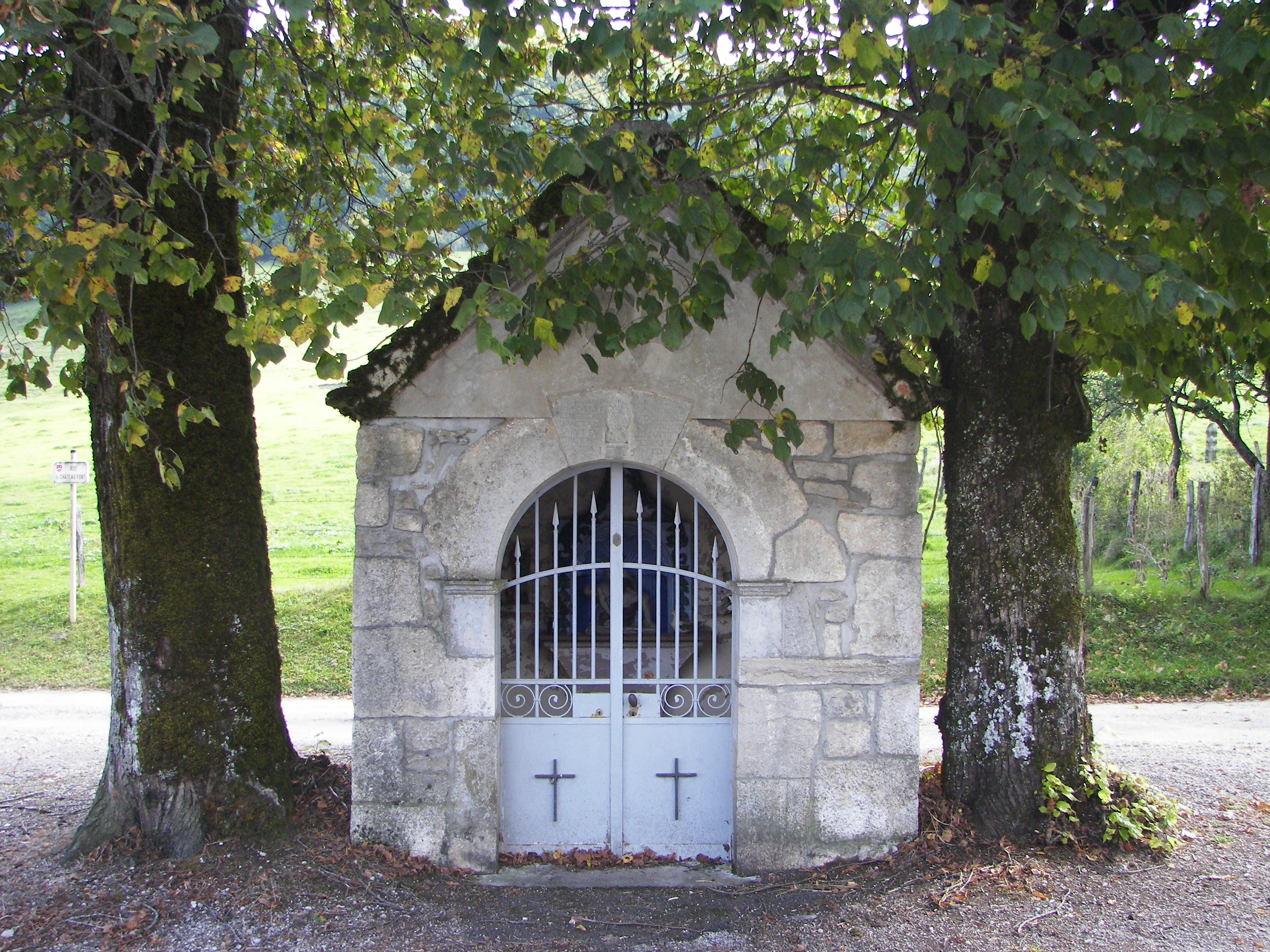
- Oratory

- Coat of arms
- Location of Montrond
- Location within France Location within Bourgogne-Franche-Comté
- Coordinates: 46°47′54″N 5°49′59″E
- Country: France
- Region: Bourgogne-Franche-Comté
- Department: Jura
- Arrondissement: Lons-le-Saunier
- Canton: Champagnole

Government
  - Mayor (2020–2026): Patrice Maire
- Area^{1}: 25.32 km^{2} (9.78 sq mi)
- Highest elevation: 678 m (2,224 ft)
- Lowest elevation: 513 m (1,683 ft)
- Population (2023): 485
  - Density: 19.2/km^{2} (49.6/sq mi)
- Time zone: UTC+01:00 (CET)
  - Summer (DST): UTC+02:00 (CEST)
- INSEE/Postal code: 39364 /39300
- ^{1} French Land Register data, which excludes lakes, ponds, glaciers > 1 km^{2} (0.386 sq mi or 247 acres) and river estuaries.

Montrond (Arpitan: Môrond) is a commune in the Jura department in Bourgogne-Franche-Comté in eastern France.

== Population ==
Historical population
Year	Pop.	±% p.a.
1968	356	—
1975	357	+0.04%
1982	383	+1.01%
1990	400	+0.54%
1999	408	+0.22%
2007	441	+0.98%
2012	510	+2.95%
2017	492	−0.72%
2023	485	−0.24%
Source: INSEE

== See also ==
- Communes of the Jura department
