= Vannoz =

- Commune
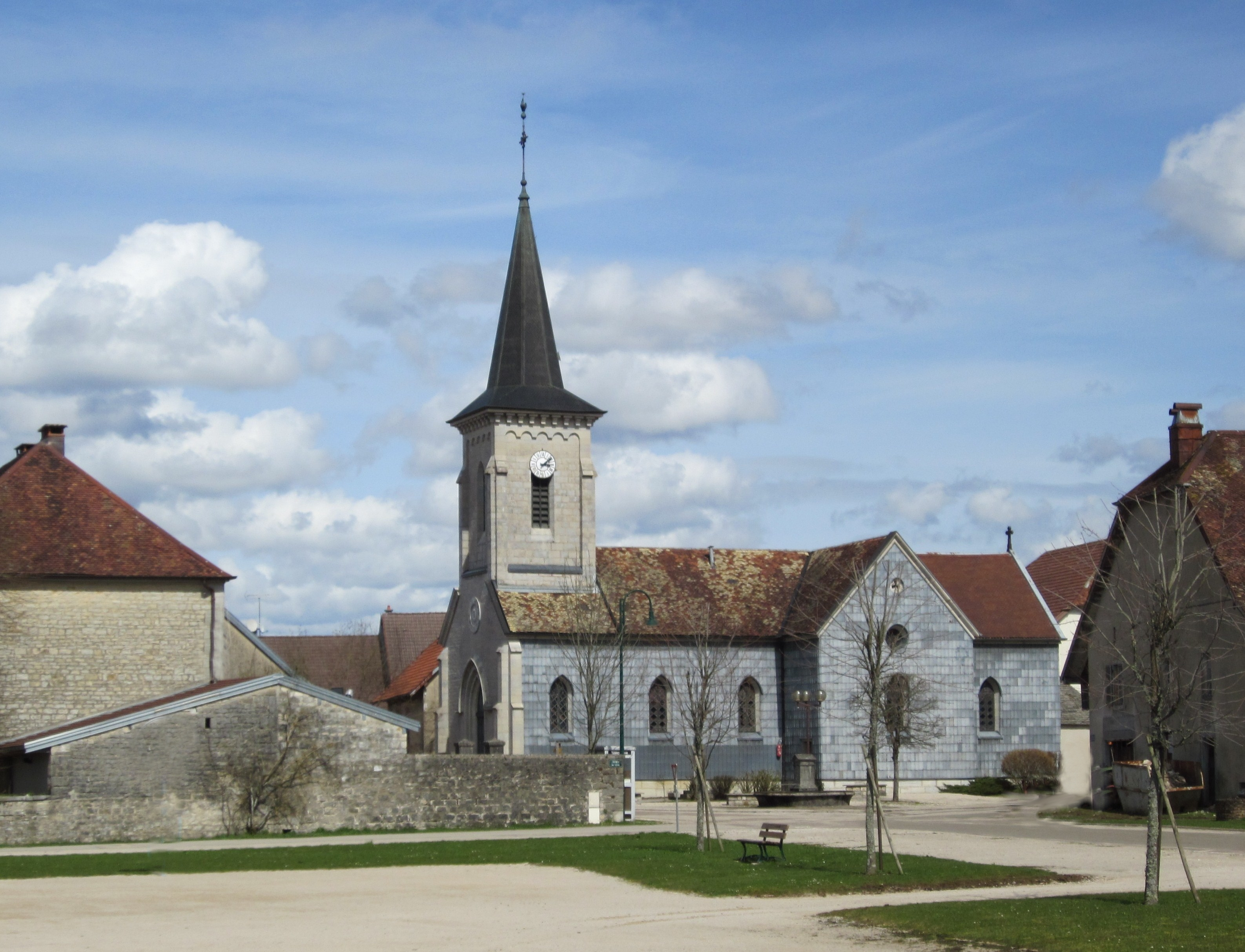
- The church in Vannoz
- Location of Vannoz
- Location within France Location within Bourgogne-Franche-Comté
- Coordinates: 46°46′25″N 5°55′03″E
- Country: France
- Region: Bourgogne-Franche-Comté
- Department: Jura
- Arrondissement: Lons-le-Saunier
- Canton: Champagnole

Government
  - Mayor (2020–2026): Philippe Ménétrier
- Area^{1}: 5.75 km^{2} (2.22 sq mi)
- Highest elevation: 800 m (2,600 ft)
- Lowest elevation: 565 m (1,854 ft)
- Population (2023): 224
  - Density: 39.0/km^{2} (101/sq mi)
- Time zone: UTC+01:00 (CET)
  - Summer (DST): UTC+02:00 (CEST)
- INSEE/Postal code: 39543 /39300
- ^{1} French Land Register data, which excludes lakes, ponds, glaciers > 1 km^{2} (0.386 sq mi or 247 acres) and river estuaries.

Vannoz (French pronunciation: [vano]; Arpitan: Vánnoz) is a commune in the Jura department in the Bourgogne-Franche-Comté region in eastern France.

== Population ==
Historical population
Year	Pop.	±% p.a.
1968	174	—
1975	191	+1.34%
1982	204	+0.95%
1990	195	−0.56%
1999	218	+1.25%
2007	205	−0.77%
2012	228	+2.15%
2017	207	−1.91%
2023	224	+1.32%
Source: INSEE

== See also ==
- Communes of the Jura department
