= Pillemoine =

Commune in Bourgogne-Franche-Comté, France

- Commune
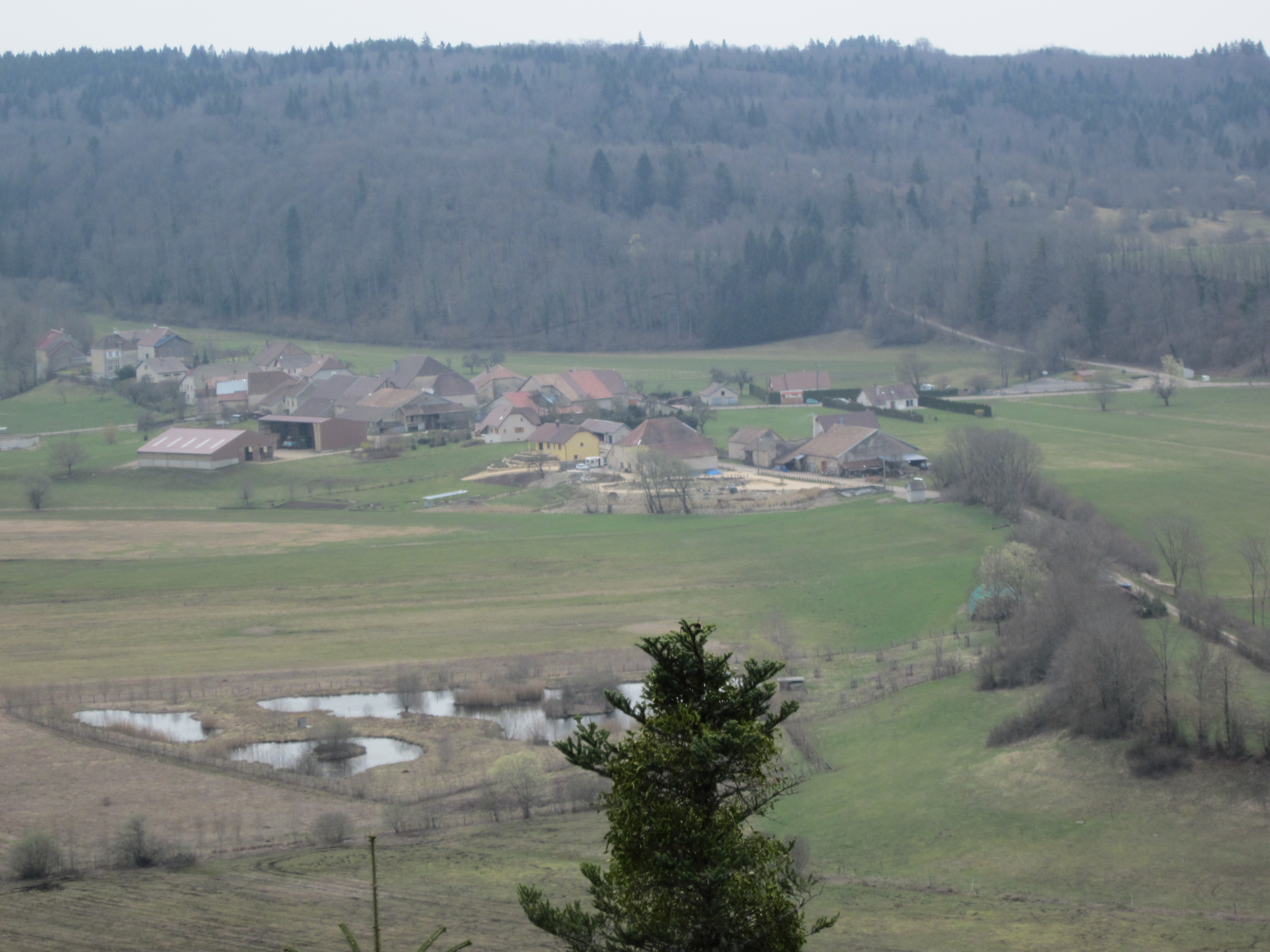
- A general view of Pillemoine
- Location of Pillemoine
- Location within France Location within Bourgogne-Franche-Comté
- Coordinates: 46°42′03″N 5°54′28″E
- Country: France
- Region: Bourgogne-Franche-Comté
- Department: Jura
- Arrondissement: Lons-le-Saunier
- Canton: Champagnole

Government
  - Mayor (2020–2026): Hervé Girardot
- Area^{1}: 4.69 km^{2} (1.81 sq mi)
- Highest elevation: 821 m (2,694 ft)
- Lowest elevation: 654 m (2,146 ft)
- Population (2023): 62
  - Density: 13/km^{2} (34/sq mi)
- Time zone: UTC+01:00 (CET)
  - Summer (DST): UTC+02:00 (CEST)
- INSEE/Postal code: 39419 /39300
- ^{1} French Land Register data, which excludes lakes, ponds, glaciers > 1 km^{2} (0.386 sq mi or 247 acres) and river estuaries.

Pillemoine (Arpitan: Pillemoinnou) is a commune in the Jura department in Bourgogne-Franche-Comté in eastern France.

== Population ==
Historical population
Year	Pop.	±% p.a.
1968	74	—
1975	48	−6.00%
1982	43	−1.56%
1990	40	−0.90%
1999	56	+3.81%
2007	62	+1.28%
2012	57	−1.67%
2017	58	+0.35%
2023	62	+1.12%
Source: INSEE

== See also ==
- Communes of the Jura department
