= Saint-Germain-en-Montagne =

Commune in Bourgogne-Franche-Comté, France

- Commune
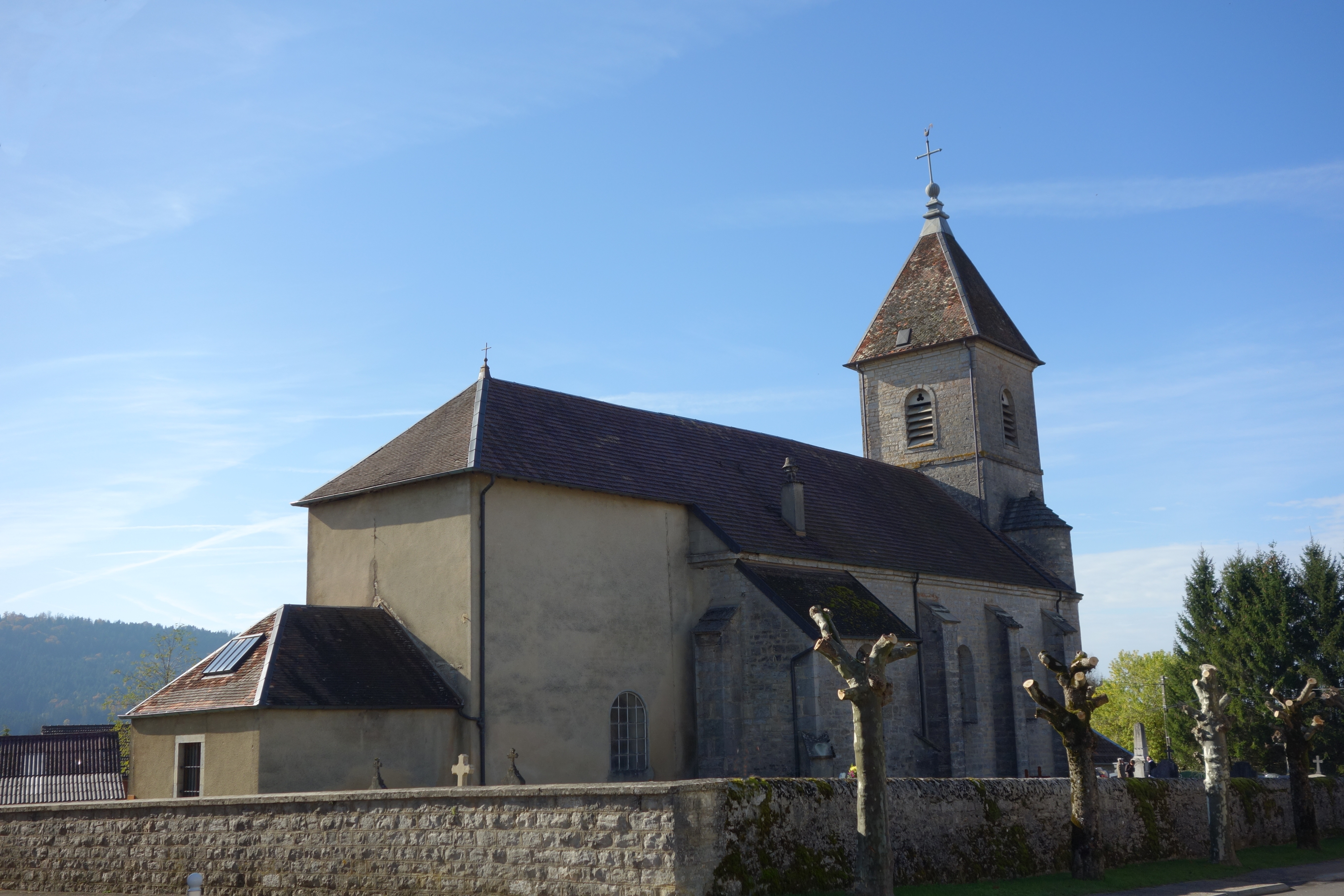
- The church in Saint-Germain-en-Montagne

- Coat of arms
- Location of Saint-Germain-en-Montagne
- Location within France Location within Bourgogne-Franche-Comté
- Coordinates: 46°46′41″N 5°56′26″E
- Country: France
- Region: Bourgogne-Franche-Comté
- Department: Jura
- Arrondissement: Lons-le-Saunier
- Canton: Champagnole

Government
  - Mayor (2020–2026): Lino Pesenti
- Area^{1}: 5.35 km^{2} (2.07 sq mi)
- Highest elevation: 850 m (2,790 ft)
- Lowest elevation: 588 m (1,929 ft)
- Population (2023): 390
  - Density: 73/km^{2} (190/sq mi)
- Time zone: UTC+01:00 (CET)
  - Summer (DST): UTC+02:00 (CEST)
- INSEE/Postal code: 39481 /39300
- ^{1} French Land Register data, which excludes lakes, ponds, glaciers > 1 km^{2} (0.386 sq mi or 247 acres) and river estuaries.

Saint-Germain-en-Montagne (French pronunciation: [sɛ̃ ʒɛʁmɛ̃ ɑ̃ mɔ̃taɲ]; Arpitan: S^{t}-Dgermain) is a commune in the Jura department in the Bourgogne-Franche-Comté region in eastern France.

== Population ==
Historical population
Year	Pop.	±% p.a.
1968	226	—
1975	302	+4.23%
1982	366	+2.78%
1990	361	−0.17%
1999	389	+0.83%
2007	401	+0.38%
2012	442	+1.97%
2017	407	−1.64%
2023	390	−0.71%
Source: INSEE

== See also ==
- Communes of the Jura department
