= Équevillon =

Commune in Bourgogne-Franche-Comté, France

- Commune
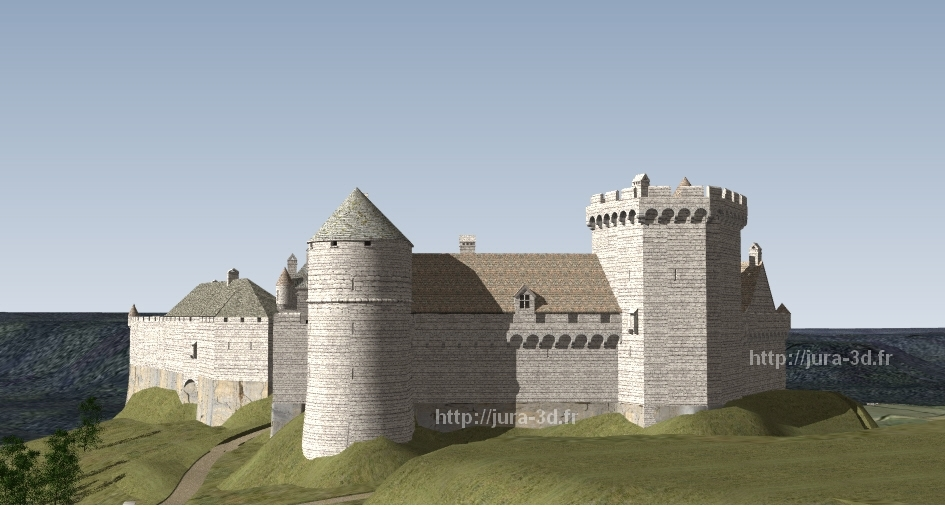
- Mont Rivel

- Coat of arms
- Location of Équevillon
- Location within France Location within Bourgogne-Franche-Comté
- Coordinates: 46°45′36″N 5°56′20″E
- Country: France
- Region: Bourgogne-Franche-Comté
- Department: Jura
- Arrondissement: Lons-le-Saunier
- Canton: Champagnole

Government
  - Mayor (2020–2026): Gérard Authier
- Area^{1}: 4.84 km^{2} (1.87 sq mi)
- Highest elevation: 812 m (2,664 ft)
- Lowest elevation: 551 m (1,808 ft)
- Population (2023): 561
  - Density: 116/km^{2} (300/sq mi)
- Time zone: UTC+01:00 (CET)
  - Summer (DST): UTC+02:00 (CEST)
- INSEE/Postal code: 39210 /39300
- ^{1} French Land Register data, which excludes lakes, ponds, glaciers > 1 km^{2} (0.386 sq mi or 247 acres) and river estuaries.

Équevillon (French pronunciation: [ekvijɔ̃]) is a commune in the Jura department in Bourgogne-Franche-Comté in eastern France.

== Population ==
Historical population
Year	Pop.	±% p.a.
1968	161	—
1975	339	+11.22%
1982	432	+3.52%
1990	518	+2.30%
1999	524	+0.13%
2007	587	+1.43%
2012	599	+0.41%
2017	582	−0.57%
2023	561	−0.61%
Source: INSEE

== See also ==
- Communes of the Jura department
