= Pont-du-Navoy =

Commune in Bourgogne-Franche-Comté, France

- Commune
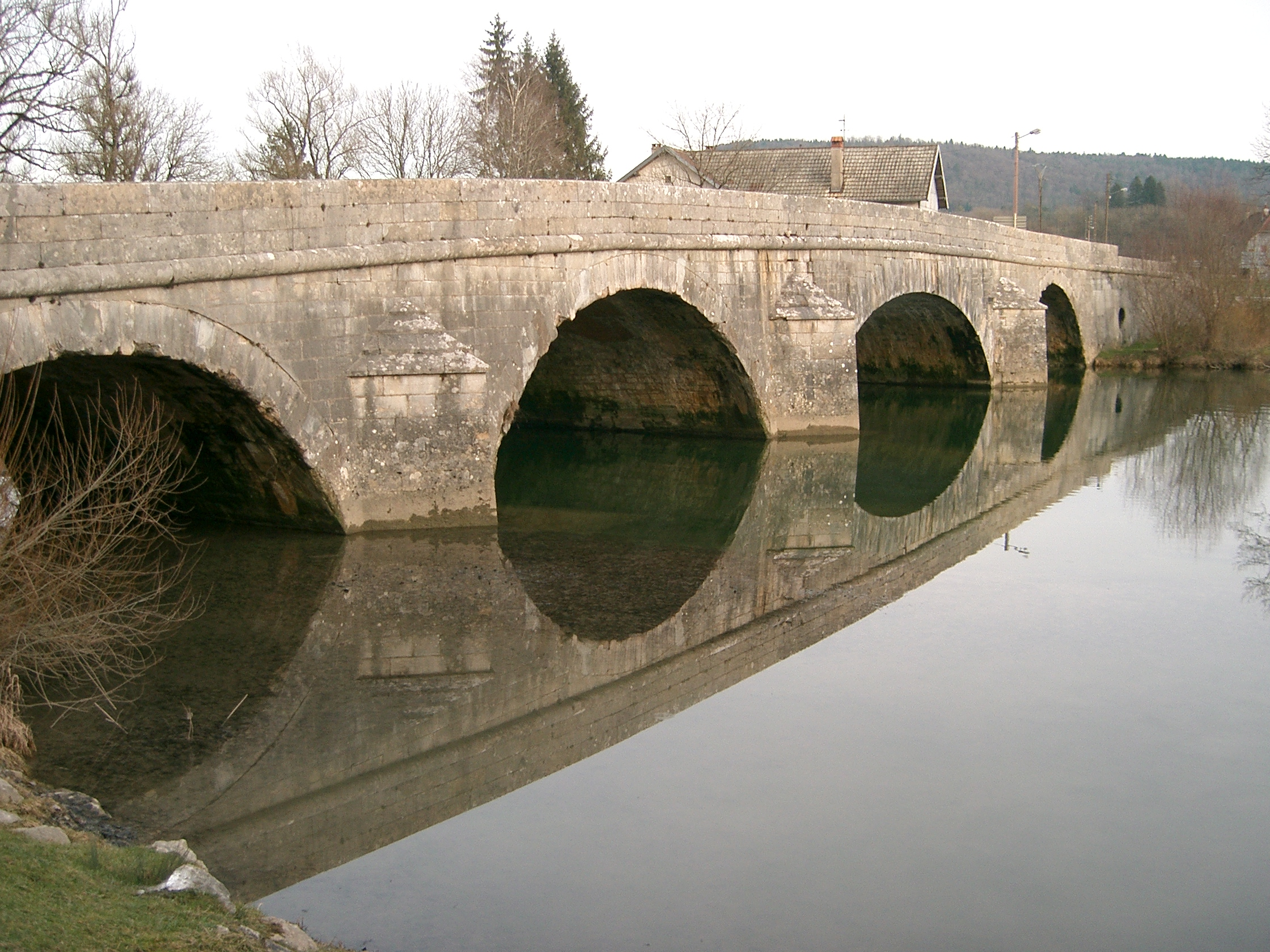
- The 18th-century bridge

- Coat of arms
- Location of Pont-du-Navoy
- Location within France Location within Bourgogne-Franche-Comté
- Coordinates: 46°43′30″N 5°46′42″E
- Country: France
- Region: Bourgogne-Franche-Comté
- Department: Jura
- Arrondissement: Lons-le-Saunier
- Canton: Champagnole

Government
  - Mayor (2020–2026): Xavier Olivier
- Area^{1}: 9.46 km^{2} (3.65 sq mi)
- Highest elevation: 741 m (2,431 ft)
- Lowest elevation: 463 m (1,519 ft)
- Population (2023): 275
  - Density: 29.1/km^{2} (75.3/sq mi)
- Time zone: UTC+01:00 (CET)
  - Summer (DST): UTC+02:00 (CEST)
- INSEE/Postal code: 39437 /39300
- ^{1} French Land Register data, which excludes lakes, ponds, glaciers > 1 km^{2} (0.386 sq mi or 247 acres) and river estuaries.

Pont-du-Navoy (French pronunciation: [pɔ̃ dy navwa]) is a commune in the Jura department in Bourgogne-Franche-Comté in eastern France.

== Population ==
Historical population
Year	Pop.	±% p.a.
1968	243	—
1975	274	+1.73%
1982	245	−1.59%
1990	230	−0.79%
1999	226	−0.19%
2007	244	+0.96%
2012	252	+0.65%
2017	275	+1.76%
2023	275	+0.00%
Source: INSEE

== See also ==
- Communes of the Jura department
