= Jean Monet =

Jean Monet or Monnet may refer to:

== People ==
- Jean Monnet (director) (1703–1785), French theatre impresario and writer
- Jean Monet (son of Claude Monet) (1867–1914), frequent subject of paintings by his father Claude Monet
- Jean Monnet (1888–1979), French businessman, administrator, and institution-builder

== Other ==
- Jean Monnet (train), an express train that linked Brussels with Strasbourg
