= Antoine-Grimoald Monnet =

French mineralogist (1734–1817)

Antoine-Grimoald Monnet (1 November 1734 – 23 May 1817) was a French mineralogist and mining specialist who became a mine inspector and wrote several treatises on mining and geology based on his travels and observations across France and neighbouring regions. Along with Jean-Étienne Guettard he published the earliest geological maps of France.

Geological map of France (1780) by Monnet and Guettard

Monnet was born in Champeix in the district of Issoire in a large middle-class family. He was self-taught and moved to Paris at the age of seventeen, attended lectures in chemistry by Guillaume-François Rouelle at the Jardin du Roi, and became a pharmacist's assistant to the apothecary Joseph Cigongne in Nantes. He gained fame after he began to analyze samples sent to Cigonge, publishing papers on mineral spring waters from Bains, Plombières, and Luxeuil in 1767 where he pointed out that there was hardly any dissolved minerals that could be responsible for any curative properties. An acquaintance with Jean-Étienne Guettard who was related to Guillaume-Chrétien de Lamoignon de Malesherbes who offered a private laboratory at his home in Vaugirard. This then led to his obtaining a position in the Bureau of commerce under Daniel Trudaine, succeeding Gabriel Jars who died in 1769. In 1776 he became an inspector of mines. His work involved travel across Europe examining mines in Alsace, Saxony, Vosges, and other places. He recognized the Vosges sandstones as being sedimentary and produced by riverine rather than marine action. He examined the works of others like Axel Cronstedt whose work he translated into French.
