= Châtelneuf, Jura =

Commune in Bourgogne-Franche-Comté, France

Châtelneuf
- Commune
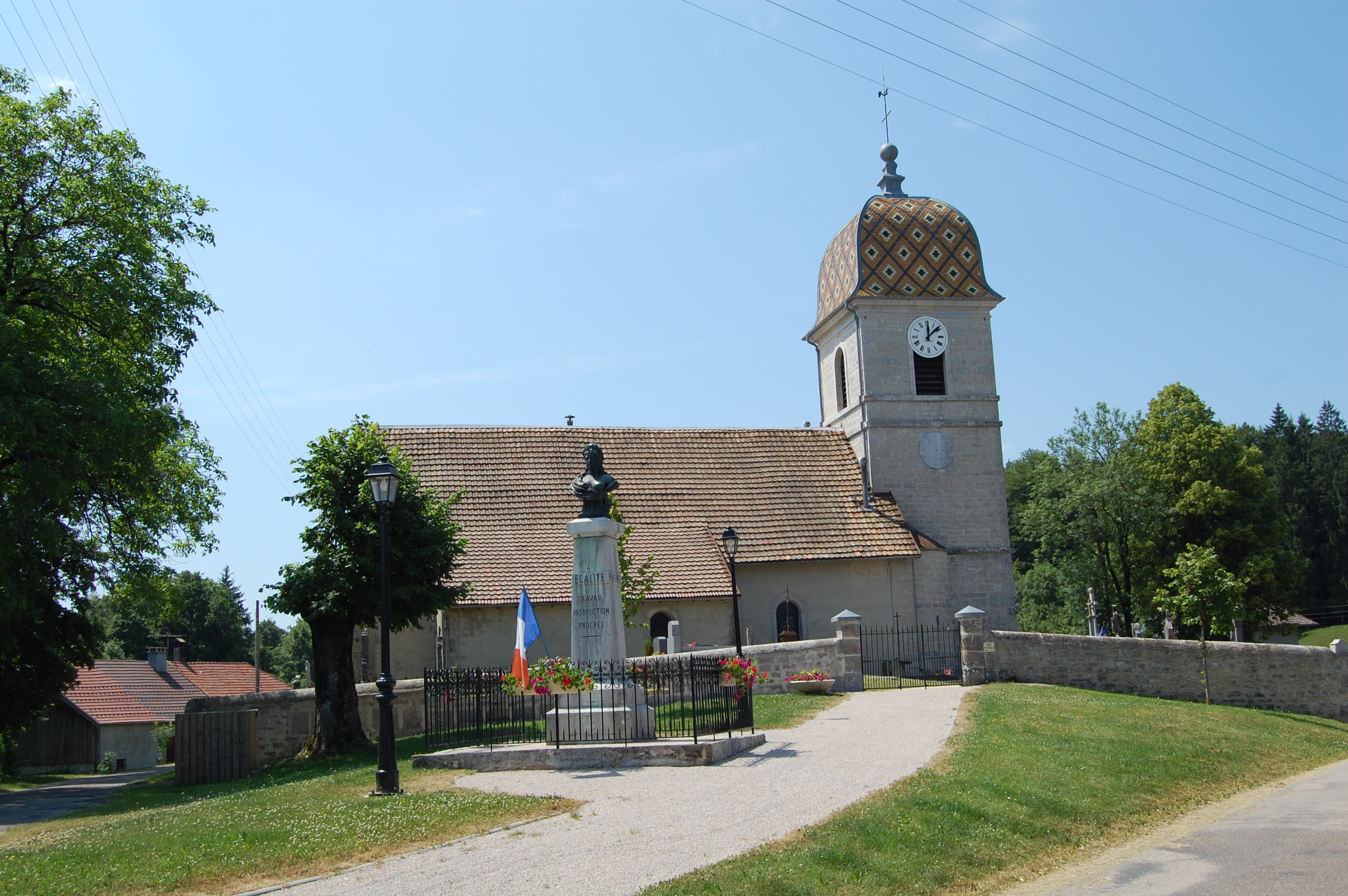
- The church in Châtelneuf
- Location of Châtelneuf
- Location within France Location within Bourgogne-Franche-Comté
- Coordinates: 46°40′33″N 5°55′03″E
- Country: France
- Region: Bourgogne-Franche-Comté
- Department: Jura
- Arrondissement: Lons-le-Saunier
- Canton: Champagnole

Government
  - Mayor (2020–2026): Bruno Ragot
- Area^{1}: 13.00 km^{2} (5.02 sq mi)
- Highest elevation: 885 m (2,904 ft)
- Lowest elevation: 677 m (2,221 ft)
- Population (2023): 120
  - Density: 9.2/km^{2} (24/sq mi)
- Time zone: UTC+01:00 (CET)
  - Summer (DST): UTC+02:00 (CEST)
- INSEE/Postal code: 39120 /39300
- ^{1} French Land Register data, which excludes lakes, ponds, glaciers > 1 km^{2} (0.386 sq mi or 247 acres) and river estuaries.

Châtelneuf (French pronunciation: [ʃatɛlnœf]; Arpitan: Tsétiânu) is a commune in the Jura department in Bourgogne-Franche-Comté in eastern France. It is around 8 km south of Champagnole.

== Population ==
Historical population
Year	Pop.	±% p.a.
1968	115	—
1975	108	−0.89%
1982	128	+2.46%
1990	125	−0.30%
1999	124	−0.09%
2007	141	+1.62%
2012	138	−0.43%
2017	138	+0.00%
2023	120	−2.30%
Source: INSEE

== See also ==
- Communes of the Jura department
