= Sapois, Jura =

Sapois
- Commune
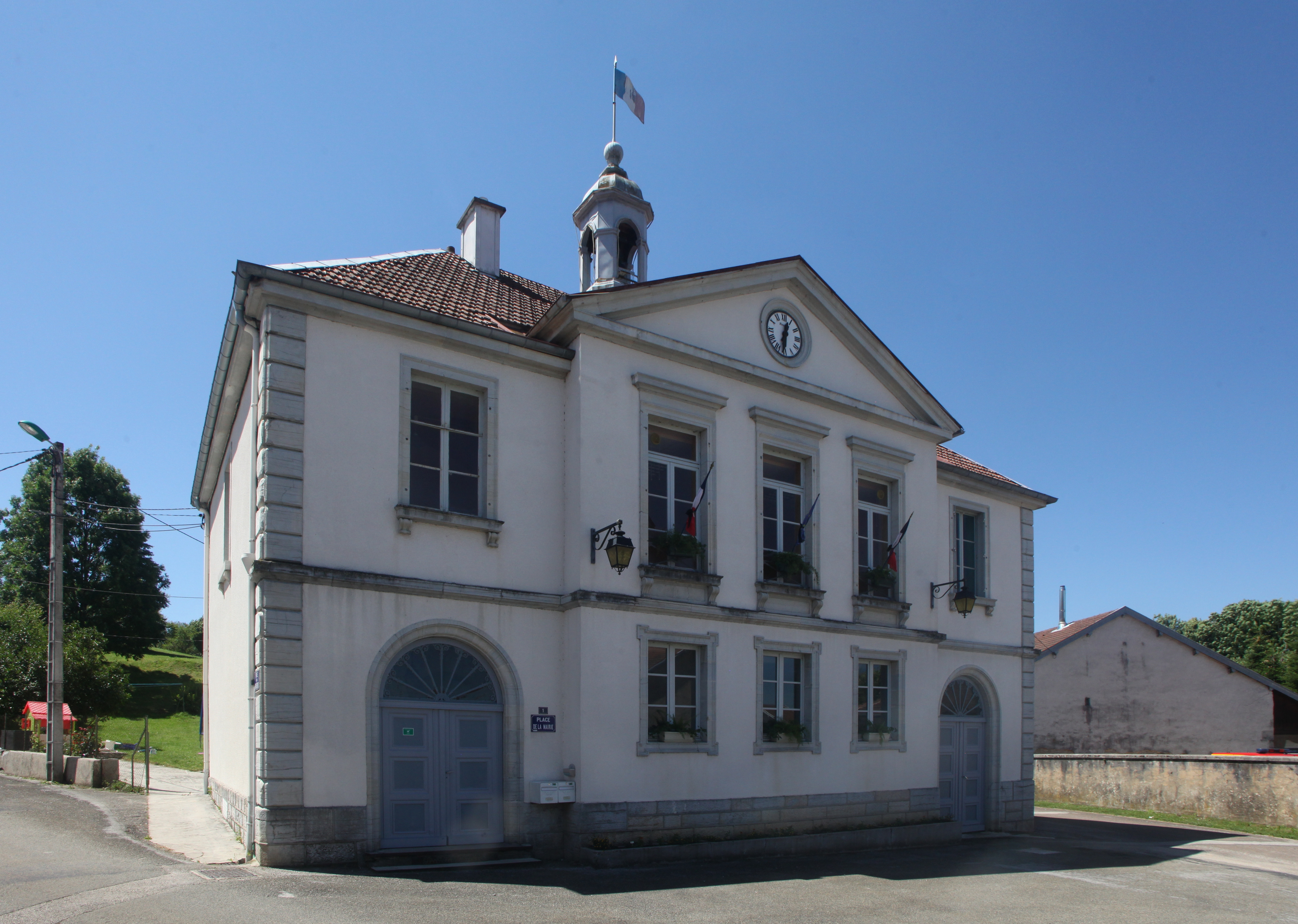
- The town hall in Sapois
- Location of Sapois
- Location within France Location within Bourgogne-Franche-Comté
- Coordinates: 46°45′04″N 5°56′37″E
- Country: France
- Region: Bourgogne-Franche-Comté
- Department: Jura
- Arrondissement: Lons-le-Saunier
- Canton: Champagnole

Government
  - Mayor (2020–2026): Jean-Pierre Masnada
- Area^{1}: 3.56 km^{2} (1.37 sq mi)
- Highest elevation: 750 m (2,460 ft)
- Lowest elevation: 548 m (1,798 ft)
- Population (2023): 408
  - Density: 115/km^{2} (297/sq mi)
- Time zone: UTC+01:00 (CET)
  - Summer (DST): UTC+02:00 (CEST)
- INSEE/Postal code: 39503 /39300
- ^{1} French Land Register data, which excludes lakes, ponds, glaciers > 1 km^{2} (0.386 sq mi or 247 acres) and river estuaries.

Sapois (French pronunciation: [sapwa]) is a commune in the Jura department in the Bourgogne-Franche-Comté region in eastern France.

== Population ==
Historical population
| Year | Pop. | ±% p.a. |
|---|---|---|
| 1968 | 213 | — |
| 1975 | 241 | +1.78% |
| 1982 | 272 | +1.74% |
| 1990 | 310 | +1.65% |
| 1999 | 287 | −0.85% |
| 2007 | 324 | +1.53% |
| 2012 | 342 | +1.09% |
| 2017 | 374 | +1.80% |
| 2023 | 408 | +1.46% |
Source: INSEE

== See also ==
- Communes of the Jura department
