= Monnet-la-Ville =

Commune in Bourgogne-Franche-Comté, France

- Commune
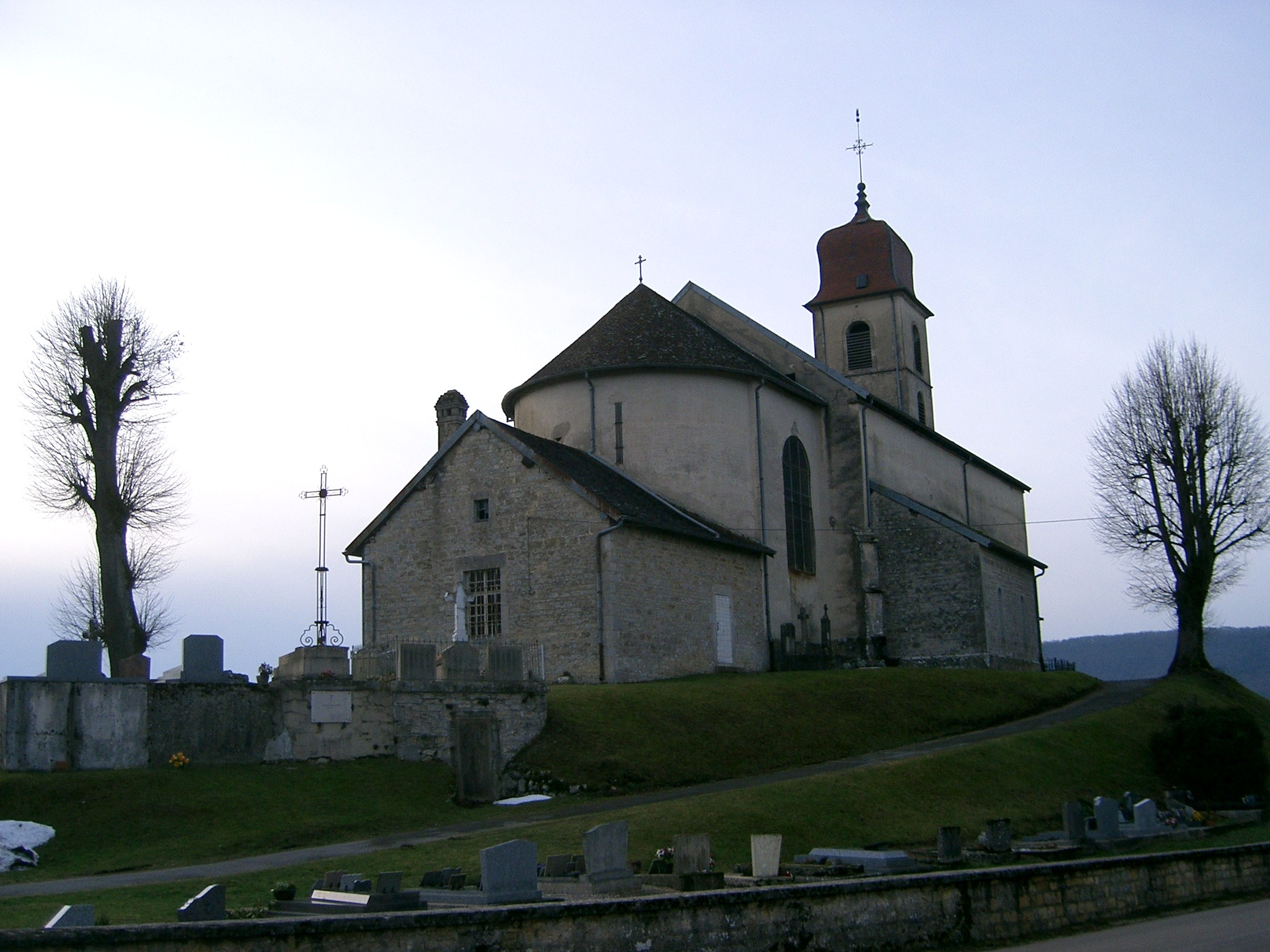
- The church in Monnet-la-Ville
- Location of Monnet-la-Ville
- Location within France Location within Bourgogne-Franche-Comté
- Coordinates: 46°43′15″N 5°47′48″E
- Country: France
- Region: Bourgogne-Franche-Comté
- Department: Jura
- Arrondissement: Lons-le-Saunier
- Canton: Champagnole

Government
  - Mayor (2020–2026): Jean-Marie Voisin
- Area^{1}: 6.19 km^{2} (2.39 sq mi)
- Highest elevation: 690 m (2,260 ft)
- Lowest elevation: 478 m (1,568 ft)
- Population (2023): 332
  - Density: 53.6/km^{2} (139/sq mi)
- Time zone: UTC+01:00 (CET)
  - Summer (DST): UTC+02:00 (CEST)
- INSEE/Postal code: 39344 /39300
- ^{1} French Land Register data, which excludes lakes, ponds, glaciers > 1 km^{2} (0.386 sq mi or 247 acres) and river estuaries.

Monnet-la-Ville (French pronunciation: [mɔnɛ la vil]; Arpitan: Monnet-la-Vela) is a commune in the Jura department in Bourgogne-Franche-Comté in eastern France.

== See also ==
- Communes of the Jura department
