= Vosbles-Valfin =

- Commune
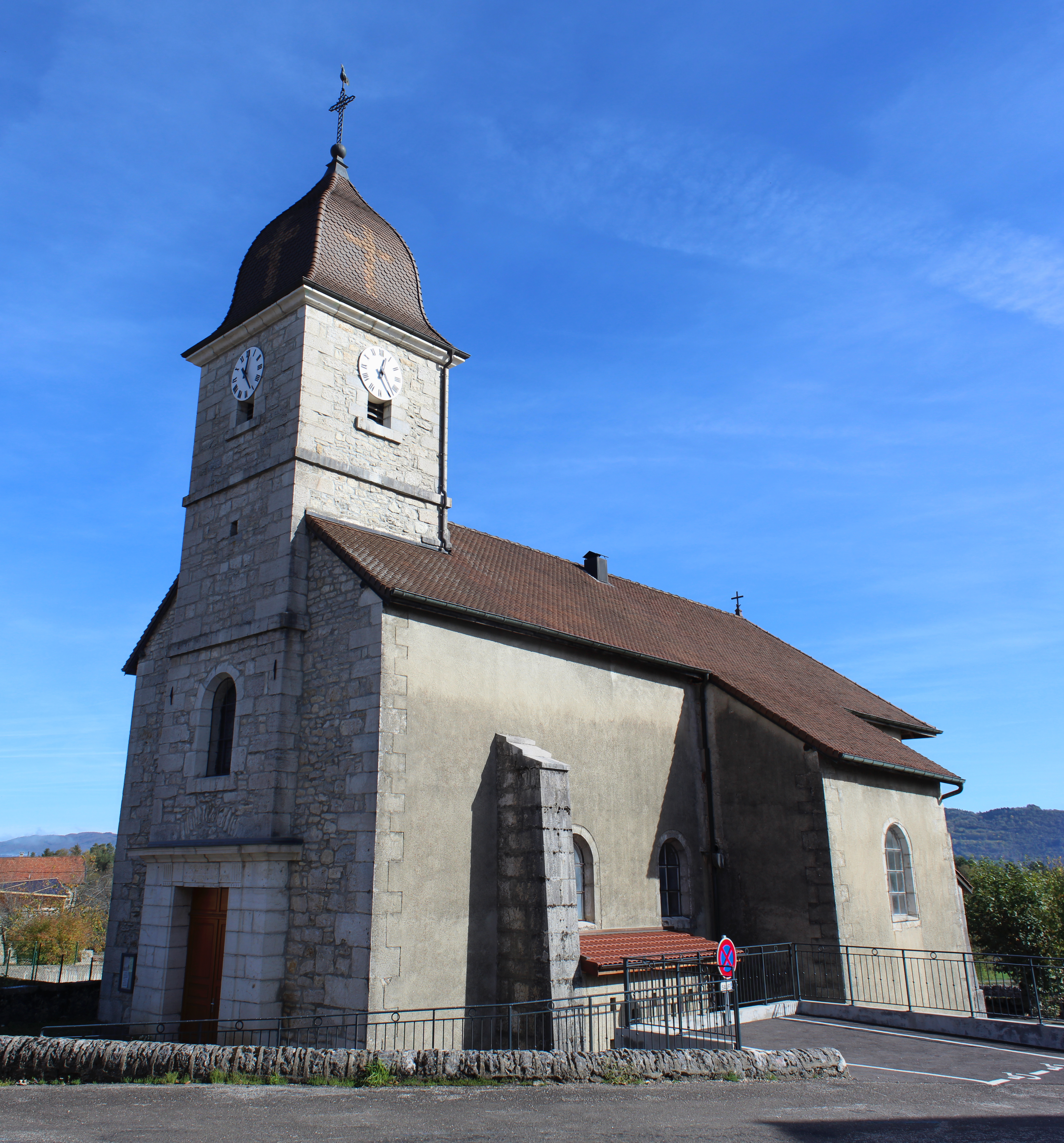
- The church in Vosbles
- Location of Vosbles-Valfin
- Location within France Location within Bourgogne-Franche-Comté
- Coordinates: 46°20′28″N 5°31′31″E
- Country: France
- Region: Bourgogne-Franche-Comté
- Department: Jura
- Arrondissement: Lons-le-Saunier
- Canton: Moirans-en-Montagne

Government
  - Mayor (2020–2026): Pascal Ravier
- Area^{1}: 21.34 km^{2} (8.24 sq mi)
- Population (2023): 185
  - Density: 8.67/km^{2} (22.5/sq mi)
- Time zone: UTC+01:00 (CET)
  - Summer (DST): UTC+02:00 (CEST)
- INSEE/Postal code: 39583 /39240
- ^{1} French Land Register data, which excludes lakes, ponds, glaciers > 1 km^{2} (0.386 sq mi or 247 acres) and river estuaries.

Vosbles-Valfin (French pronunciation: [vobl valfɛ̃]) is a commune in the Jura department of eastern France. The municipality was established on 1 January 2018 and consists of the former communes of Valfin-sur-Valouse and Vosbles.

== See also ==
- Communes of the Jura department
