= Valfin-sur-Valouse =

- Part of Vosbles-Valfin
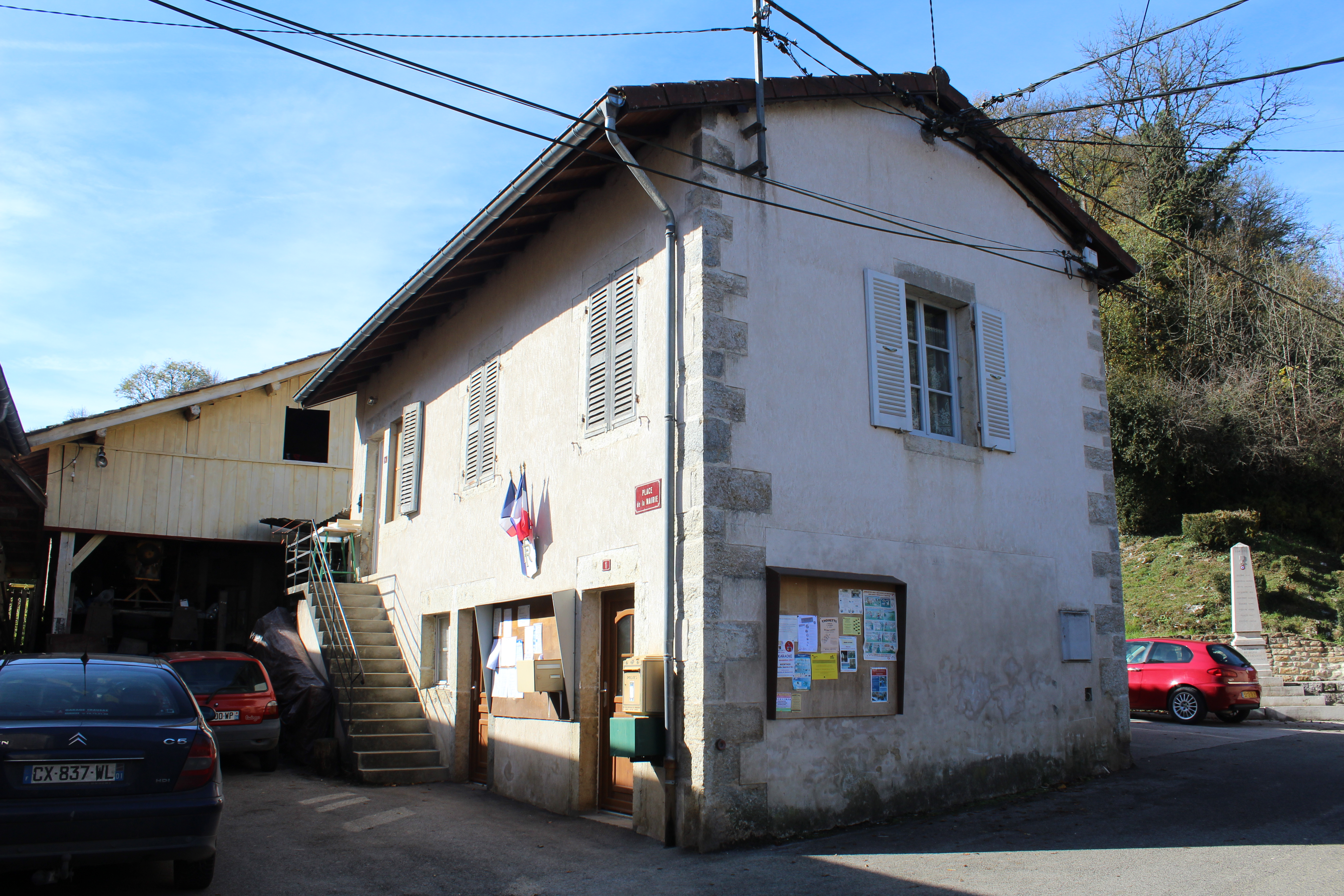
- Valfin-sur-Valouse Town hall
- Location of Valfin-sur-Valouse
- Location within France Location within Bourgogne-Franche-Comté
- Coordinates: 46°22′13″N 5°31′12″E
- Country: France
- Region: Bourgogne-Franche-Comté
- Department: Jura
- Arrondissement: Lons-le-Saunier
- Canton: Moirans-en-Montagne
- Commune: Vosbles-Valfin
- Area^{1}: 8.67 km^{2} (3.35 sq mi)
- Highest elevation: 689 m (2,260 ft)
- Lowest elevation: 335 m (1,099 ft)
- Population (2023): 73
  - Density: 8.4/km^{2} (22/sq mi)
- Time zone: UTC+01:00 (CET)
  - Summer (DST): UTC+02:00 (CEST)
- Postal code: 39240
- ^{1} French Land Register data, which excludes lakes, ponds, glaciers > 1 km^{2} (0.386 sq mi or 247 acres) and river estuaries.

Valfin-sur-Valouse (French pronunciation: [valfɛ̃ syʁ valuz]) is a former commune in the Jura department in the Bourgogne-Franche-Comté region in eastern France. On 1 January 2018, it was merged into the new commune of Vosbles-Valfin.

== See also ==
- Communes of the Jura department
