= Vosbles =

Commune in Jura, France

- Part of Vosbles-Valfin
- Location of Vosbles
- Location within France Location within Bourgogne-Franche-Comté
- Coordinates: 46°20′28″N 5°31′31″E
- Country: France
- Region: Bourgogne-Franche-Comté
- Department: Jura
- Arrondissement: Lons-le-Saunier
- Canton: Moirans-en-Montagne
- Commune: Vosbles-Valfin
- Area^{1}: 12.67 km^{2} (4.89 sq mi)
- Highest elevation: 730 m (2,400 ft)
- Lowest elevation: 319 m (1,047 ft)
- Population (2015): 110
  - Density: 8.7/km^{2} (22/sq mi)
- Time zone: UTC+01:00 (CET)
  - Summer (DST): UTC+02:00 (CEST)
- Postal code: 39240
- ^{1} French Land Register data, which excludes lakes, ponds, glaciers > 1 km^{2} (0.386 sq mi or 247 acres) and river estuaries.

Vosbles (French pronunciation: [vobl]) is a former commune in the Jura department in the Bourgogne-Franche-Comté region in eastern France. On 1 January 2018, it was merged into the new commune of Vosbles-Valfin.

== See also ==
- Communes of the Jura department
