= Lac du Fort-du-Plasne =

Lake in France

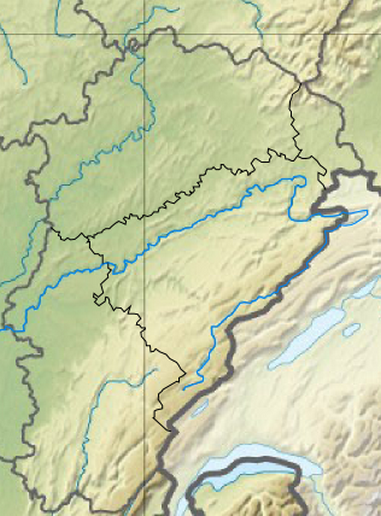
- Location within Franche-Comté
- Location: Fort-du-Plasne, Jura department, Franche-Comté
- Coordinates: 46°37′11.5″N 5°59′51.0″E
- Basin countries: France

Lac du Fort-du-Plasne is a lake at Fort-du-Plasne in the Jura department of France.
