= Fort-du-Plasne =

Commune in Bourgogne-Franche-Comté, France

- Commune
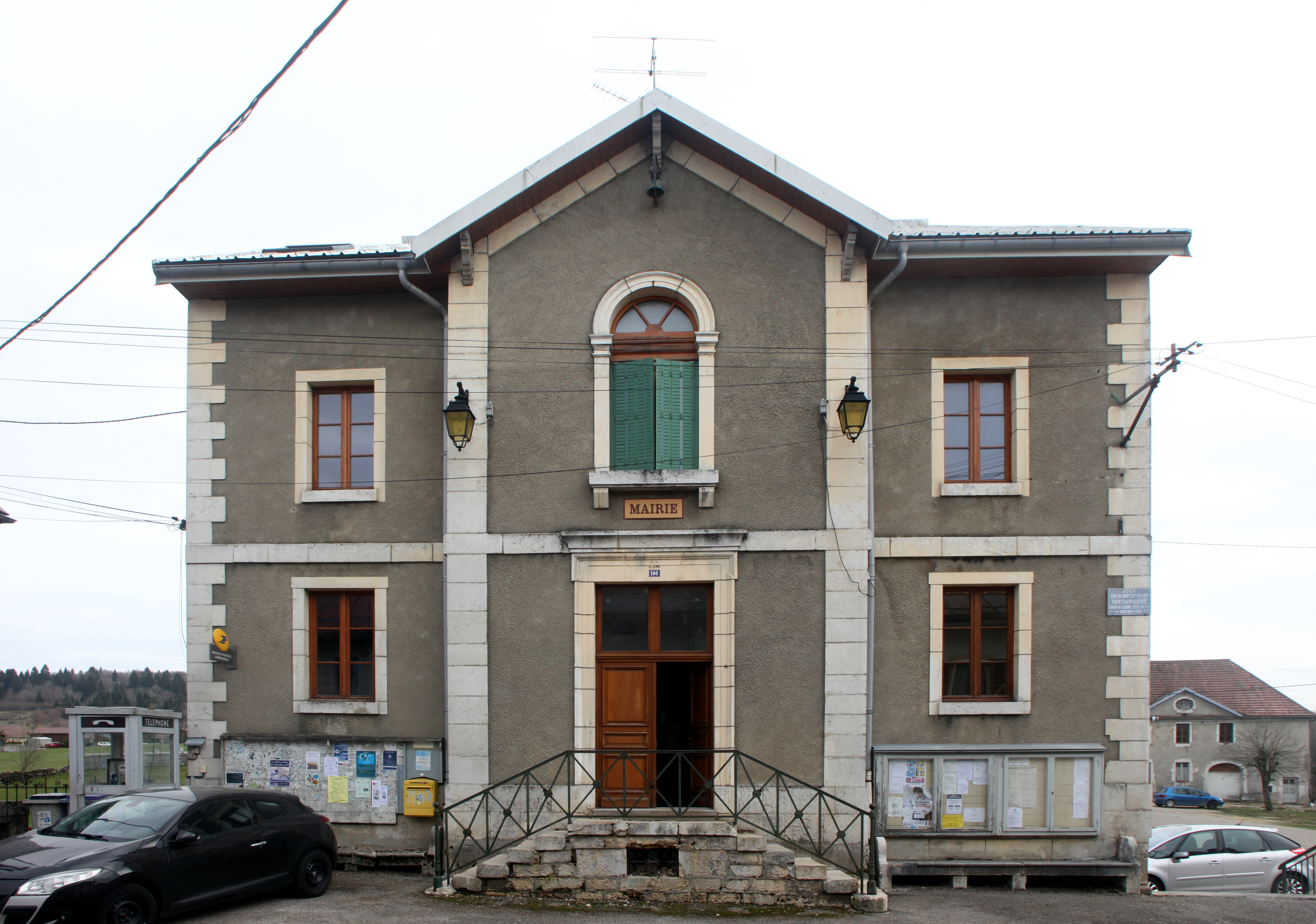
- The town hall in Fort-du-Plasne
- Location of Fort-du-Plasne
- Location within France Location within Bourgogne-Franche-Comté
- Coordinates: 46°37′09″N 5°59′23″E
- Country: France
- Region: Bourgogne-Franche-Comté
- Department: Jura
- Arrondissement: Saint-Claude
- Canton: Saint-Laurent-en-Grandvaux

Government
  - Mayor (2023–2026): Tanguy Cuby
- Area^{1}: 12.92 km^{2} (4.99 sq mi)
- Highest elevation: 970 m (3,180 ft)
- Lowest elevation: 730 m (2,400 ft)
- Population (2023): 484
  - Density: 37.5/km^{2} (97.0/sq mi)
- Time zone: UTC+01:00 (CET)
  - Summer (DST): UTC+02:00 (CEST)
- INSEE/Postal code: 39232 /39150
- ^{1} French Land Register data, which excludes lakes, ponds, glaciers > 1 km^{2} (0.386 sq mi or 247 acres) and river estuaries.

Fort-du-Plasne (French pronunciation: [fɔʁ dy plɑn]) is a commune in the Jura department in Bourgogne-Franche-Comté in eastern France.

== Population ==
Historical population
Year	Pop.	±% p.a.
1968	302	—
1975	308	+0.28%
1982	264	−2.18%
1990	314	+2.19%
1999	397	+2.64%
2007	424	+0.83%
2012	429	+0.23%
2017	443	+0.64%
2023	484	+1.49%
Source: INSEE

== See also ==
- Communes of the Jura department
