= La Chaumusse =

Commune in Bourgogne-Franche-Comté, France

- Commune
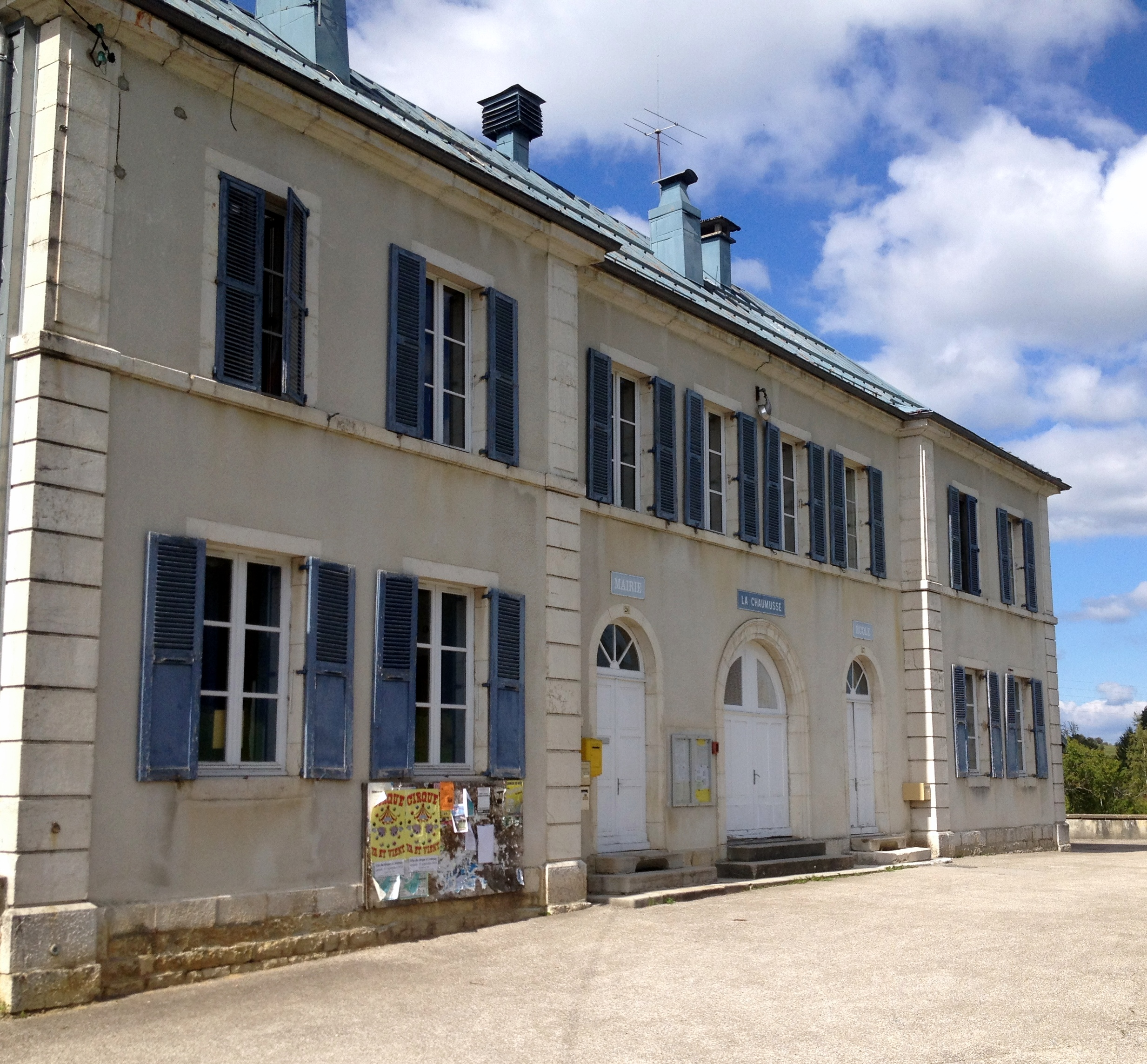
- Town hall
- Location of La Chaumusse
- Location within France Location within Bourgogne-Franche-Comté
- Coordinates: 46°35′13″N 5°56′28″E
- Country: France
- Region: Bourgogne-Franche-Comté
- Department: Jura
- Arrondissement: Saint-Claude
- Canton: Saint-Laurent-en-Grandvaux

Government
  - Mayor (2020–2026): Jean-Claude Bauduret
- Area^{1}: 10.62 km^{2} (4.10 sq mi)
- Highest elevation: 958 m (3,143 ft)
- Lowest elevation: 790 m (2,590 ft)
- Population (2023): 389
  - Density: 36.6/km^{2} (94.9/sq mi)
- Time zone: UTC+01:00 (CET)
  - Summer (DST): UTC+02:00 (CEST)
- INSEE/Postal code: 39126 /39150
- ^{1} French Land Register data, which excludes lakes, ponds, glaciers > 1 km^{2} (0.386 sq mi or 247 acres) and river estuaries.

La Chaumusse (French pronunciation: [la ʃomys]) is a commune in the Jura department in Bourgogne-Franche-Comté in eastern France.

== Population ==
Historical population
Year	Pop.	±% p.a.
1968	244	—
1975	203	−2.59%
1982	251	+3.08%
1990	264	+0.63%
1999	289	+1.01%
2007	337	+1.94%
2012	384	+2.65%
2017	402	+0.92%
2023	389	−0.55%
Source: INSEE

== See also ==
- Communes of the Jura department
