= Fontainebrux =

Commune in Bourgogne-Franche-Comté, France

- Commune
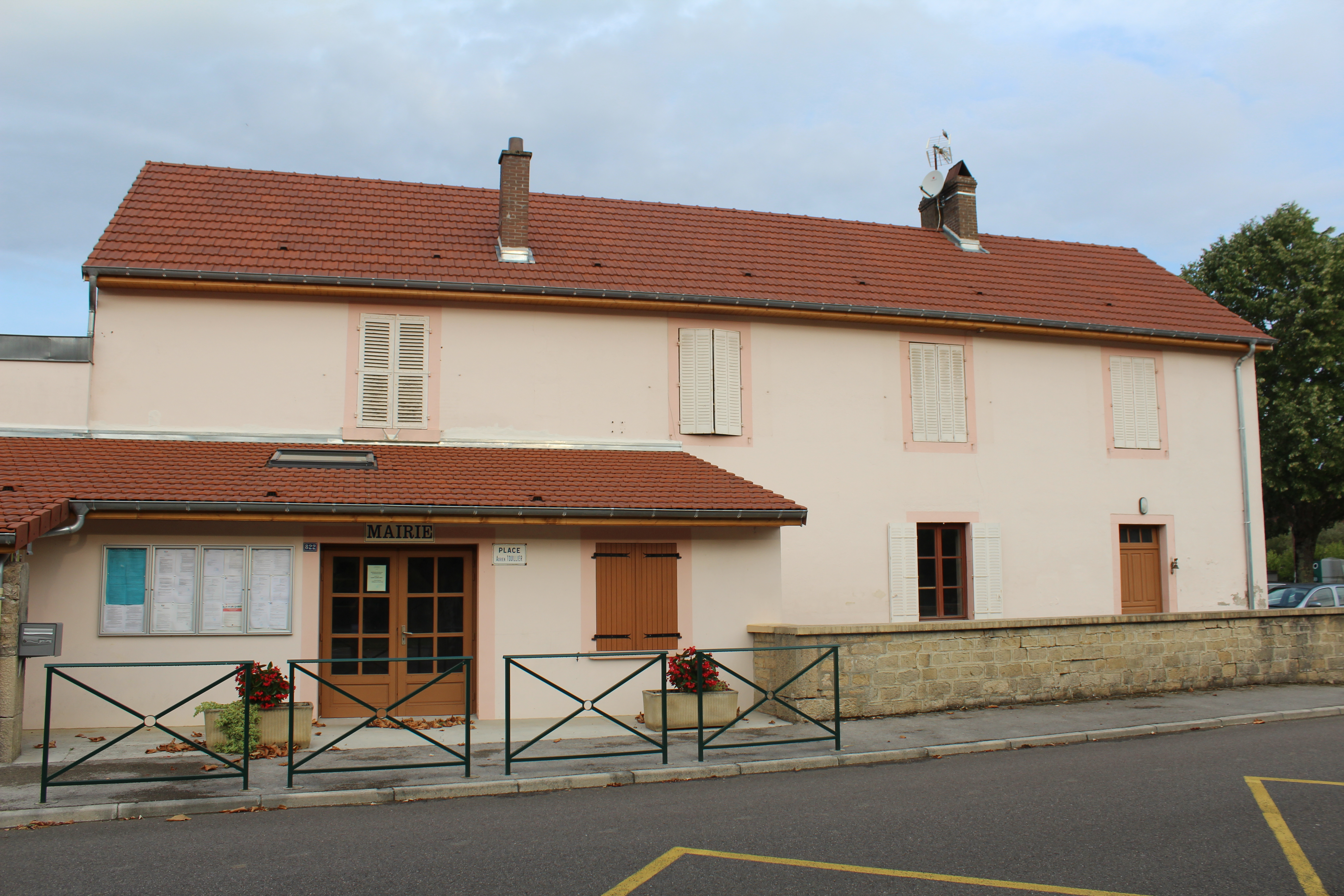
- The town hall in Fontainebrux

- Coat of arms
- Location of Fontainebrux
- Location within France Location within Bourgogne-Franche-Comté
- Coordinates: 46°42′17″N 5°25′22″E
- Country: France
- Region: Bourgogne-Franche-Comté
- Department: Jura
- Arrondissement: Lons-le-Saunier
- Canton: Bletterans

Government
  - Mayor (2020–2026): Quentin Paroisse
- Area^{1}: 6.75 km^{2} (2.61 sq mi)
- Highest elevation: 229 m (751 ft)
- Lowest elevation: 195 m (640 ft)
- Population (2023): 224
  - Density: 33.2/km^{2} (85.9/sq mi)
- Time zone: UTC+01:00 (CET)
  - Summer (DST): UTC+02:00 (CEST)
- INSEE/Postal code: 39229 /39140
- ^{1} French Land Register data, which excludes lakes, ponds, glaciers > 1 km^{2} (0.386 sq mi or 247 acres) and river estuaries.

Fontainebrux (French pronunciation: [fɔ̃tɛnbʁy]) is a commune in the Jura department in Bourgogne-Franche-Comté in eastern France.

== Population ==
Historical population
| Year | Pop. | ±% p.a. |
|---|---|---|
| 1968 | 101 | — |
| 1975 | 104 | +0.42% |
| 1982 | 110 | +0.80% |
| 1990 | 116 | +0.67% |
| 1999 | 131 | +1.36% |
| 2007 | 189 | +4.69% |
| 2012 | 187 | −0.21% |
| 2017 | 202 | +1.56% |
| 2023 | 224 | +1.74% |
Source: INSEE

== See also ==
- Communes of the Jura department
