= La Chaux-en-Bresse =

Commune in Bourgogne-Franche-Comté, France

- Commune
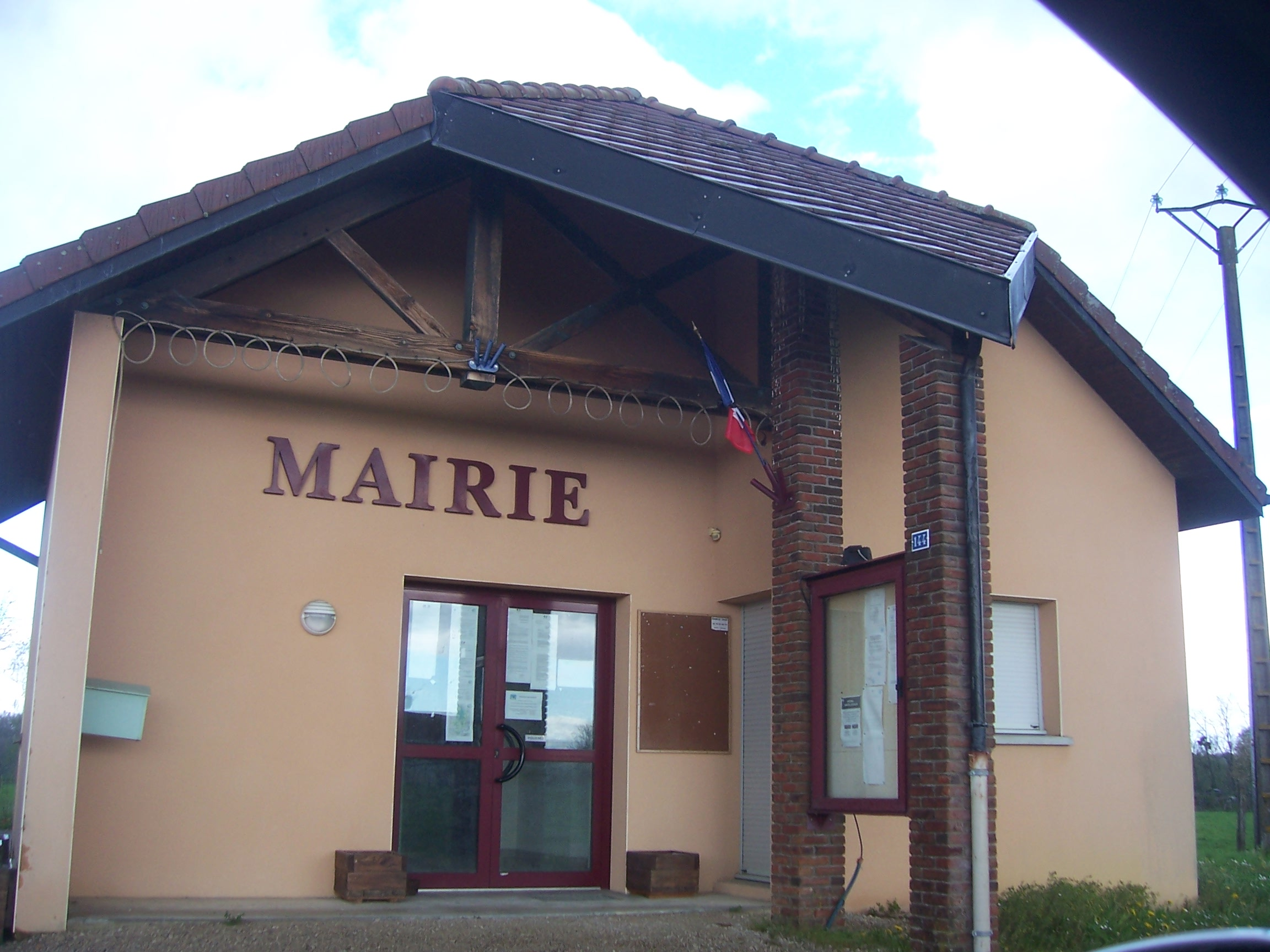
- Town hall
- Location of La Chaux-en-Bresse
- Location within France Location within Bourgogne-Franche-Comté
- Coordinates: 46°49′38″N 5°28′51″E
- Country: France
- Region: Bourgogne-Franche-Comté
- Department: Jura
- Arrondissement: Lons-le-Saunier
- Canton: Bletterans

Government
  - Mayor (2020–2026): Evelyne Digonnaux
- Area^{1}: 2.05 km^{2} (0.79 sq mi)
- Highest elevation: 223 m (732 ft)
- Lowest elevation: 195 m (640 ft)
- Population (2023): 30
  - Density: 15/km^{2} (38/sq mi)
- Time zone: UTC+01:00 (CET)
  - Summer (DST): UTC+02:00 (CEST)
- INSEE/Postal code: 39132 /39230
- ^{1} French Land Register data, which excludes lakes, ponds, glaciers > 1 km^{2} (0.386 sq mi or 247 acres) and river estuaries.

La Chaux-en-Bresse (French pronunciation: [la ʃo ɑ̃ bʁɛs], literally La Chaux in Bresse) is a commune in the Jura department in Bourgogne-Franche-Comté in eastern France.

== Population ==
Historical population
Year	Pop.	±% p.a.
1968	44	—
1975	30	−5.32%
1982	39	+3.82%
1990	38	−0.32%
1999	36	−0.60%
2007	34	−0.71%
2012	37	+1.71%
2017	39	+1.06%
2023	30	−4.28%
Source: INSEE

== See also ==
- Communes of the Jura department
