= Arrondissement of Lons-le-Saunier =

Coordinates: 46.67°N 5.55°E

Lons-le-Saunier
- Arrondissement
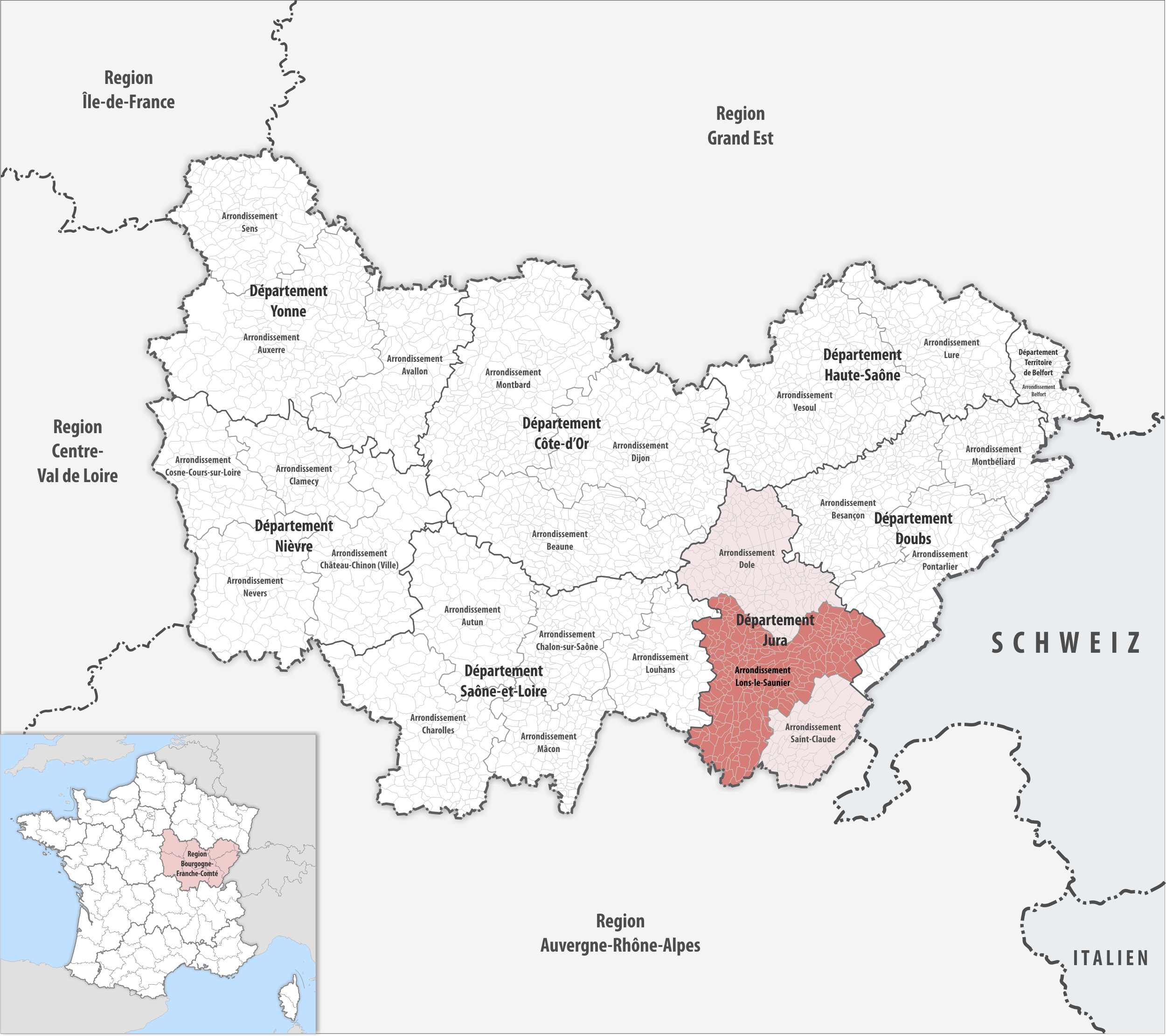
- Location within the region Bourgogne-Franche-Comté
- Country: France
- Region: Bourgogne-Franche-Comté
- Department: Jura
- No. of communes: {{{nbcomm}}}
- Area: 2,271.9 km^{2} (877.2 sq mi)
- Population (2023): 104,048
  - Density: 45.798/km^{2} (118.62/sq mi)
- INSEE code: 392

The arrondissement of Lons-le-Saunier is an arrondissement of France in the Jura department in the Bourgogne-Franche-Comté region. It has 248 communes. Its population is 104,178 (2021), and its area is 2,271.9 km^{2} (877.2 sq mi).

== Composition ==
The communes of the arrondissement of Lons-le-Saunier are:

1. Alièze
2. Andelot-en-Montagne
3. Andelot-Morval
4. Ardon
5. Arinthod
6. Arlay
7. Aromas
8. Arsure-Arsurette
9. Augea
10. Augisey
11. Balanod
12. Barésia-sur-l'Ain
13. Baume-les-Messieurs
14. Beaufort-Orbagna
15. Beffia
16. Bief-des-Maisons
17. Bief-du-Fourg
18. Billecul
19. Bletterans
20. Blois-sur-Seille
21. Blye
22. Bois-de-Gand
23. Boissia
24. La Boissière
25. Bonlieu
26. Bonnefontaine
27. Bornay
28. Bourg-de-Sirod
29. Briod
30. Broissia
31. Censeau
32. Cerniébaud
33. Cernon
34. Cesancey
35. La Chailleuse
36. Les Chalesmes
37. Chambéria
38. Champagnole
39. Champrougier
40. Chapelle-Voland
41. Chapois
42. Charcier
43. Charency
44. Charézier
45. La Charme
46. Charnod
47. La Chassagne
48. Château-Chalon
49. Châtelneuf
50. Châtillon
51. Chaumergy
52. Chaux-des-Crotenay
53. La Chaux-en-Bresse
54. Chavéria
55. Chemenot
56. Chêne-Sec
57. Chevreaux
58. Chevrotaine
59. Chille
60. Chilly-le-Vignoble
61. Cize
62. Clairvaux-les-Lacs
63. Cogna
64. Commenailles
65. Condamine
66. Condes
67. Conliège
68. Conte
69. Cornod
70. Cosges
71. Courbette
72. Courbouzon
73. Courlans
74. Courlaoux
75. Cousance
76. Crans
77. Cressia
78. Crotenay
79. Cuisia
80. Cuvier
81. Denezières
82. Desnes
83. Les Deux-Fays
84. Digna
85. Domblans
86. Dompierre-sur-Mont
87. Doucier
88. Doye
89. Dramelay
90. Écrille
91. Entre-deux-Monts
92. Équevillon
93. Esserval-Tartre
94. L'Étoile
95. La Favière
96. Foncine-le-Bas
97. Foncine-le-Haut
98. Fontainebrux
99. Fontenu
100. Foulenay
101. Francheville
102. Fraroz
103. La Frasnée
104. Le Frasnois
105. Frébuans
106. Frontenay
107. Genod
108. Geruge
109. Gevingey
110. Gigny
111. Gillois
112. Gizia
113. Graye-et-Charnay
114. Hautecour
115. Hauteroche, Jura
116. Ladoye-sur-Seille
117. Le Larderet
118. Largillay-Marsonnay
119. Larnaud
120. Le Latet
121. La Latette
122. Lavigny
123. Lent
124. Loisia
125. Lombard
126. Longcochon
127. Lons-le-Saunier
128. Loulle
129. Le Louverot
130. Macornay
131. Mantry
132. Marigna-sur-Valouse
133. Marigny
134. Marnézia
135. La Marre
136. Maynal
137. Menétru-le-Vignoble
138. Menétrux-en-Joux
139. Mérona
140. Mesnois
141. Messia-sur-Sorne
142. Mièges
143. Mignovillard
144. Moiron
145. Monnetay
146. Monnet-la-Ville
147. Montagna-le-Reconduit
148. Montaigu
149. Montain
150. Montfleur
151. Montigny-sur-l'Ain
152. Montlainsia
153. Montmorot
154. Montrevel
155. Montrond
156. Mont-sur-Monnet
157. Mournans-Charbonny
158. Moutonne
159. Moutoux
160. Nance
161. Nancuise
162. Les Nans
163. Nevy-sur-Seille
164. Ney
165. Nogna
166. Nozeroy
167. Onglières
168. Onoz
169. Orgelet
170. Pannessières
171. Le Pasquier
172. Passenans
173. Patornay
174. Perrigny
175. Pillemoine
176. Pimorin
177. Le Pin
178. Plainoiseau
179. Plaisia
180. Les Planches-en-Montagne
181. Plénise
182. Plénisette
183. Poids-de-Fiole
184. Pont-de-Poitte
185. Pont-du-Navoy
186. Présilly
187. Publy
188. Quintigny
189. Recanoz
190. Reithouse
191. Relans
192. Les Repôts
193. Revigny
194. Rix
195. Rosay
196. Rotalier
197. Rothonay
198. Ruffey-sur-Seille
199. Rye
200. Saffloz
201. Saint-Amour
202. Saint-Didier
203. Saint-Germain-en-Montagne
204. Saint-Hymetière-sur-Valouse
205. Saint-Lamain
206. Saint-Maur
207. Saint-Maurice-Crillat
208. Sapois
209. Sarrogna
210. Saugeot
211. Sellières
212. Sergenaux
213. Sergenon
214. Sirod
215. Songeson
216. Soucia
217. Supt
218. Syam
219. Thoirette-Coisia
220. Thoiria
221. Thoissia
222. Toulouse-le-Château
223. La Tour-du-Meix
224. Trenal
225. Les Trois-Châteaux
226. Uxelles
227. Val-d'Épy
228. Valempoulières
229. Val-Sonnette
230. Val Suran
231. Valzin en Petite Montagne
232. Vannoz
233. Le Vaudioux
234. Verges
235. Véria
236. Vernantois
237. Le Vernois
238. Vers-en-Montagne
239. Vers-sous-Sellières
240. Vertamboz
241. Vescles
242. Vevy
243. Villeneuve-sous-Pymont
244. Villevieux
245. Le Villey
246. Vincent-Froideville
247. Voiteur
248. Vosbles-Valfin

== History ==
The arrondissement of Lons-le-Saunier was created in 1800. In May 2006 it gained the canton of Chaumergy from the arrondissement of Dole, and it lost the canton of Villers-Farlay to the arrondissement of Dole. At the January 2017 reorganisation of the arrondissements of Jura, it gained four communes from the arrondissement of Saint-Claude, and it lost 67 communes to the arrondissement of Dole.

As a result of the reorganisation of the cantons of France which came into effect in 2015, the borders of the cantons are no longer related to the borders of the arrondissements. The cantons of the arrondissement of Lons-le-Saunier were, as of January 2015:

1. Arbois
2. Arinthod
3. Beaufort
4. Bletterans
5. Champagnole
6. Chaumergy
7. Clairvaux-les-Lacs
8. Conliège
9. Lons-le-Saunier-Nord
10. Lons-le-Saunier-Sud
11. Nozeroy
12. Orgelet
13. Les Planches-en-Montagne
14. Poligny
15. Saint-Amour
16. Saint-Julien
17. Salins-les-Bains
18. Sellières
19. Voiteur
