= Rye, Jura =

Commune in Bourgogne-Franche-Comté, France

Rye
- Commune
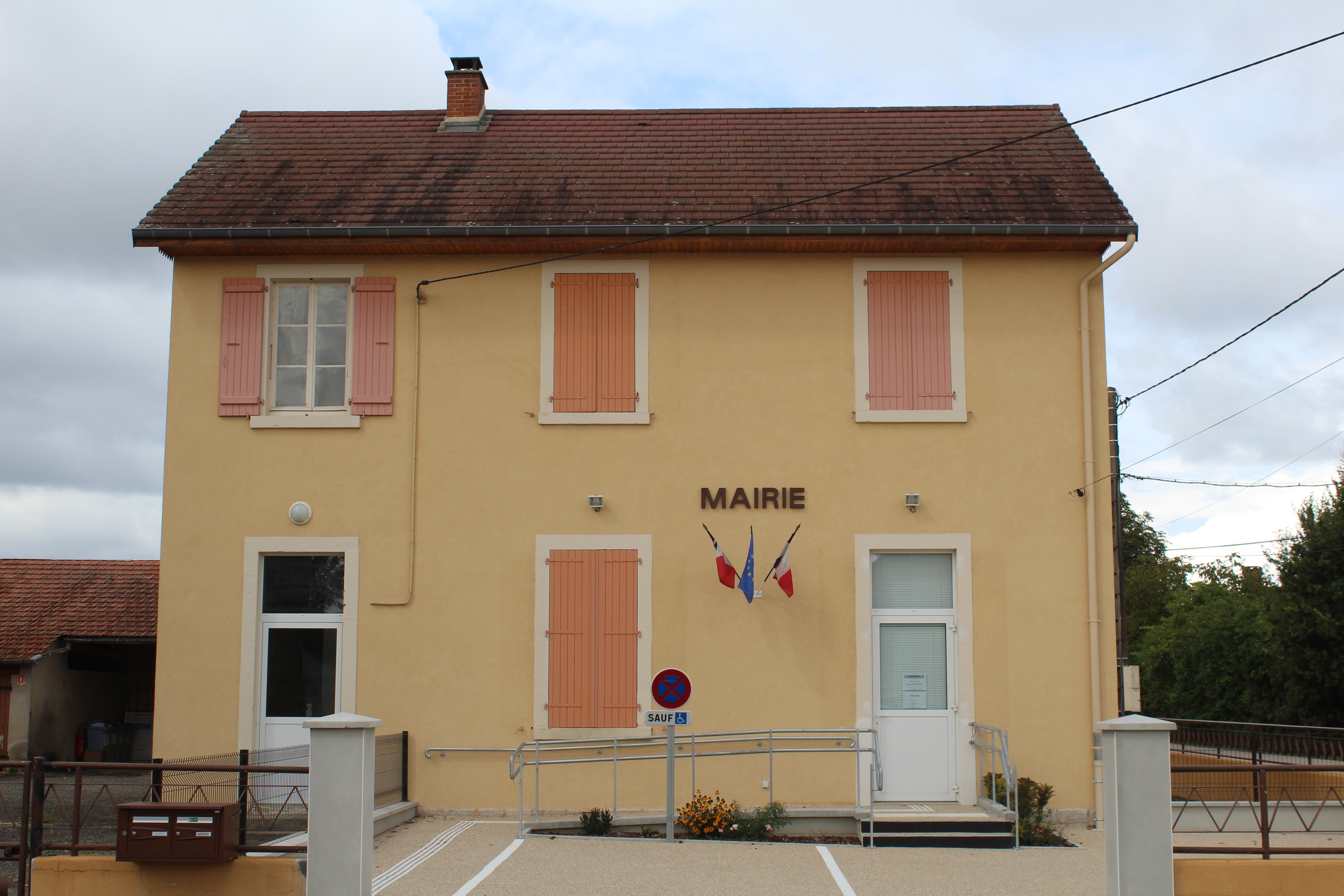
- The town hall in Rye

- Coat of arms
- Location of Rye
- Location within France Location within Bourgogne-Franche-Comté
- Coordinates: 46°52′18″N 5°25′48″E
- Country: France
- Region: Bourgogne-Franche-Comté
- Department: Jura
- Arrondissement: Lons-le-Saunier
- Canton: Bletterans

Government
  - Mayor (2020–2026): Jean-Claude Boissard
- Area^{1}: 11.84 km^{2} (4.57 sq mi)
- Highest elevation: 219 m (719 ft)
- Lowest elevation: 190 m (620 ft)
- Population (2023): 222
  - Density: 18.7/km^{2} (48.6/sq mi)
- Time zone: UTC+01:00 (CET)
  - Summer (DST): UTC+02:00 (CEST)
- INSEE/Postal code: 39472 /39230
- ^{1} French Land Register data, which excludes lakes, ponds, glaciers > 1 km^{2} (0.386 sq mi or 247 acres) and river estuaries.

Rye (French pronunciation: [ʁi]) is a commune in the Jura department in region of Bourgogne-Franche-Comté in eastern France.

== Population ==
Historical population
Year	Pop.	±% p.a.
1968	241	—
1975	213	−1.75%
1982	187	−1.84%
1990	165	−1.55%
1999	161	−0.27%
2007	171	+0.76%
2012	206	+3.79%
2017	218	+1.14%
2023	222	+0.30%
Source: INSEE

== See also ==
- Communes of the Jura department
