= Hautecour, Jura =

Commune in Bourgogne-Franche-Comté, France

Hautecour
- Commune
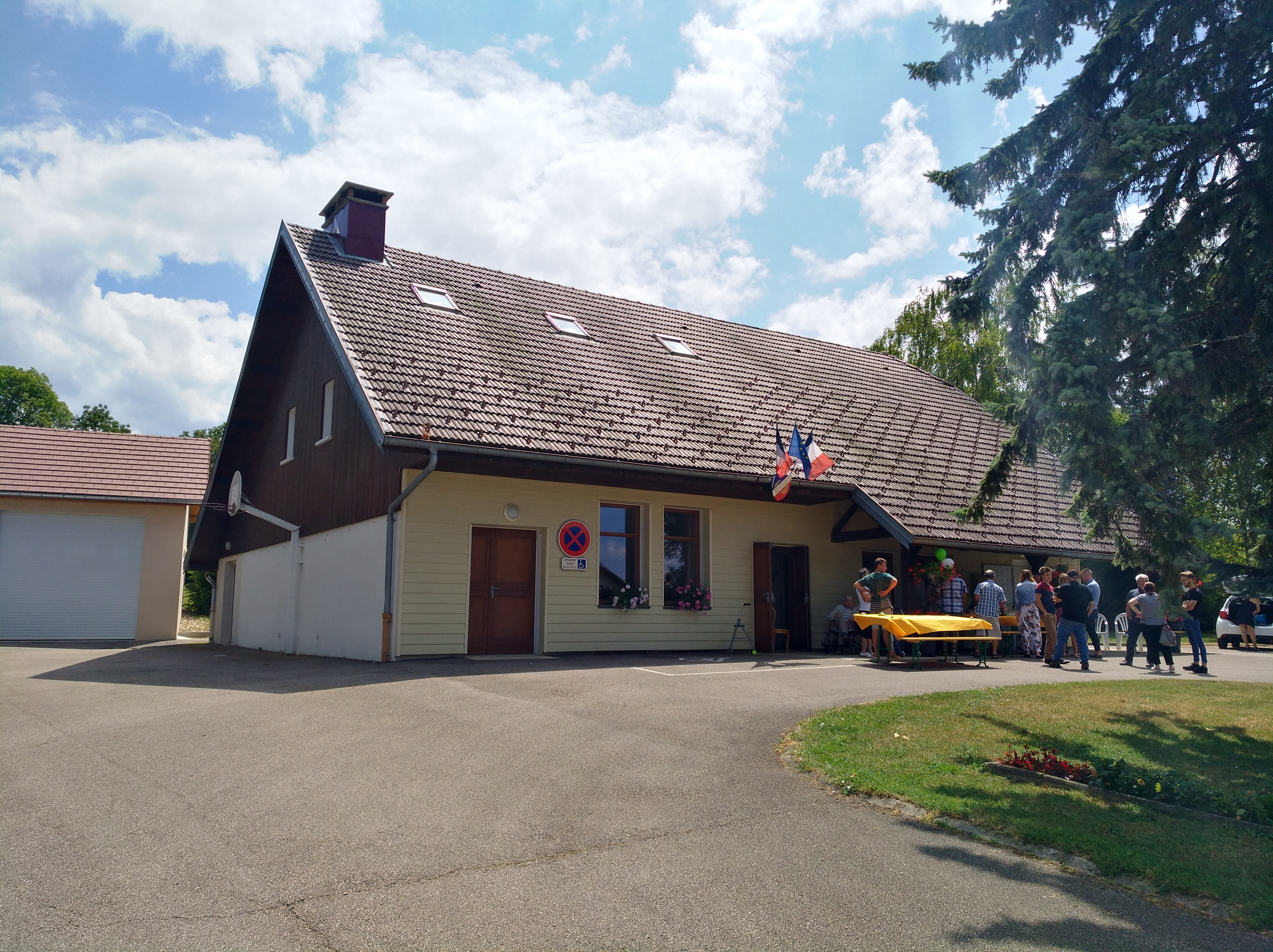
- The town hall in Hautecour
- Location of Hautecour
- Location within France Location within Bourgogne-Franche-Comté
- Coordinates: 46°34′09″N 5°45′59″E
- Country: France
- Region: Bourgogne-Franche-Comté
- Department: Jura
- Arrondissement: Lons-le-Saunier
- Canton: Saint-Laurent-en-Grandvaux

Government
  - Mayor (2020–2026): Gwenaël Colin
- Area^{1}: 5.19 km^{2} (2.00 sq mi)
- Highest elevation: 779 m (2,556 ft)
- Lowest elevation: 570 m (1,870 ft)
- Population (2023): 196
  - Density: 37.8/km^{2} (97.8/sq mi)
- Time zone: UTC+01:00 (CET)
  - Summer (DST): UTC+02:00 (CEST)
- INSEE/Postal code: 39265 /39130
- ^{1} French Land Register data, which excludes lakes, ponds, glaciers > 1 km^{2} (0.386 sq mi or 247 acres) and river estuaries.

Hautecour (French pronunciation: [otkuʁ]) is a commune in the Jura department in Bourgogne-Franche-Comté in eastern France.

== Population ==
Historical population
| Year | Pop. | ±% p.a. |
|---|---|---|
| 1968 | 54 | — |
| 1975 | 106 | +10.11% |
| 1982 | 160 | +6.06% |
| 1990 | 153 | −0.56% |
| 1999 | 180 | +1.82% |
| 2007 | 165 | −1.08% |
| 2012 | 191 | +2.97% |
| 2017 | 191 | +0.00% |
| 2023 | 196 | +0.43% |
Source: INSEE

== See also ==
- Communes of the Jura department
