= Entre-deux-Monts =

Commune in Bourgogne-Franche-Comté, France

- Commune
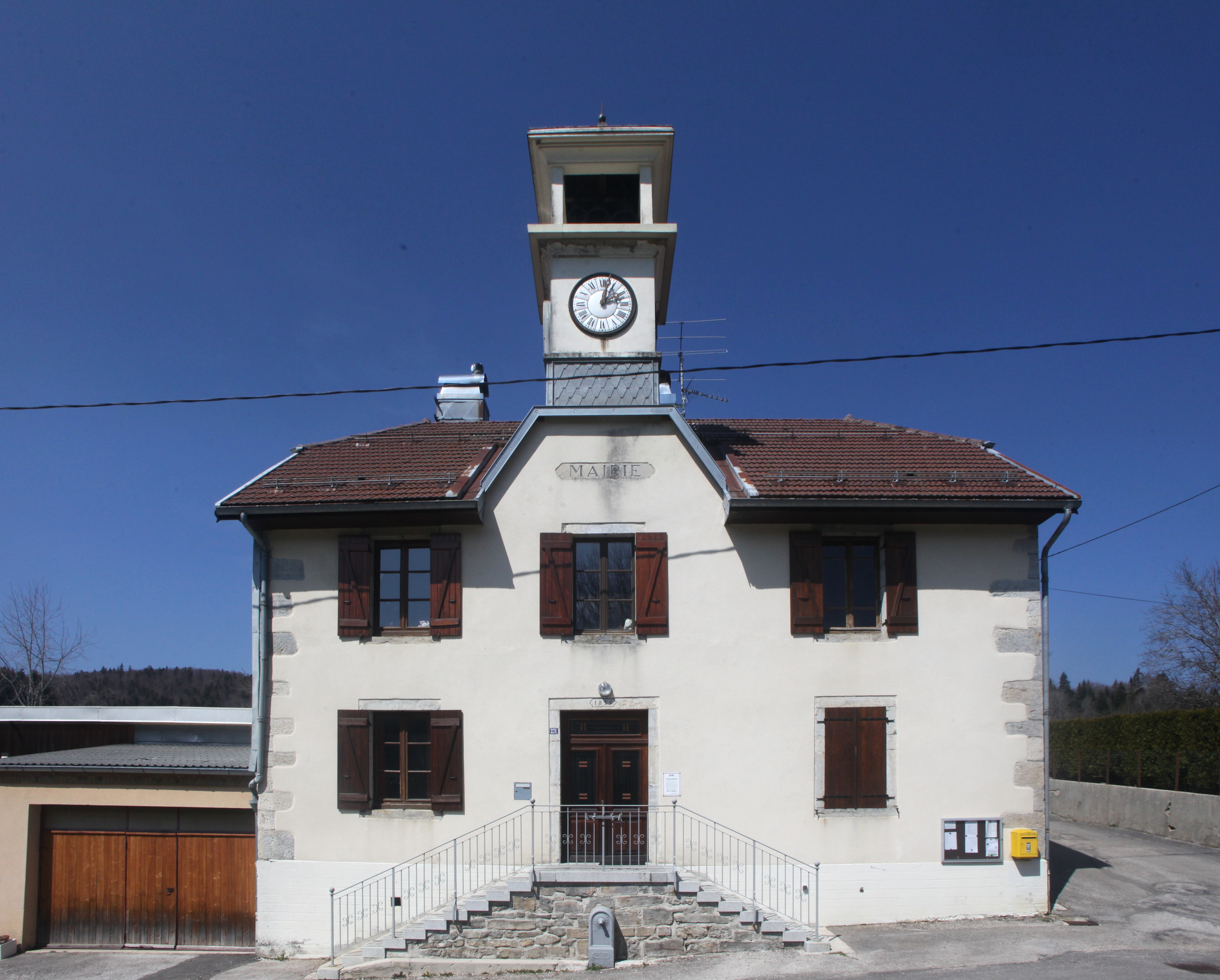
- The town hall in Entre-deux-Monts
- Location of Entre-deux-Monts
- Location within France Location within Bourgogne-Franche-Comté
- Coordinates: 46°38′36″N 5°58′18″E
- Country: France
- Region: Bourgogne-Franche-Comté
- Department: Jura
- Arrondissement: Lons-le-Saunier
- Canton: Saint-Laurent-en-Grandvaux

Government
  - Mayor (2020–2026): Michel Bourgeois
- Area^{1}: 5.36 km^{2} (2.07 sq mi)
- Highest elevation: 940 m (3,080 ft)
- Lowest elevation: 713 m (2,339 ft)
- Population (2023): 166
  - Density: 31.0/km^{2} (80.2/sq mi)
- Time zone: UTC+01:00 (CET)
  - Summer (DST): UTC+02:00 (CEST)
- INSEE/Postal code: 39208 /39150
- ^{1} French Land Register data, which excludes lakes, ponds, glaciers > 1 km^{2} (0.386 sq mi or 247 acres) and river estuaries.

Entre-deux-Monts (French pronunciation: [ɑ̃tʁ dø mɔ̃]) is a commune in the Jura department in Bourgogne-Franche-Comté in eastern France.

== Population ==
Historical population
| Year | Pop. | ±% p.a. |
|---|---|---|
| 1968 | 139 | — |
| 1975 | 99 | −4.73% |
| 1982 | 102 | +0.43% |
| 1990 | 114 | +1.40% |
| 1999 | 123 | +0.85% |
| 2007 | 151 | +2.60% |
| 2012 | 151 | +0.00% |
| 2017 | 142 | −1.22% |
| 2023 | 166 | +2.64% |
Source: INSEE

== See also ==
- Communes of the Jura department
