= Passenans =

Commune in Bourgogne-Franche-Comté, France

- Commune
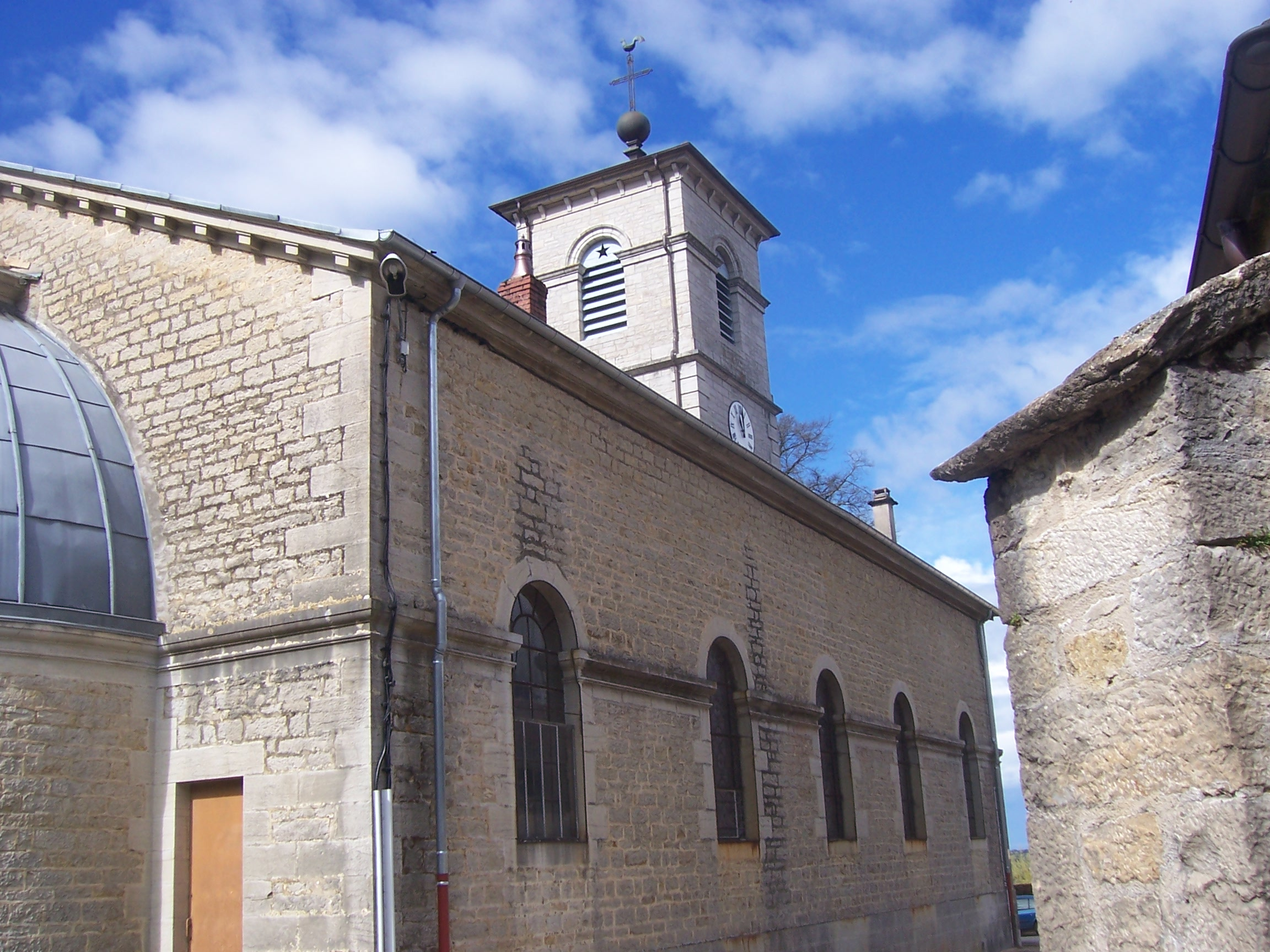
- The church in Passenans
- Location of Passenans
- Location within France Location within Bourgogne-Franche-Comté
- Coordinates: 46°47′56″N 5°37′10″E
- Country: France
- Region: Bourgogne-Franche-Comté
- Department: Jura
- Arrondissement: Lons-le-Saunier
- Canton: Bletterans

Government
  - Mayor (2020–2026): Michel Trossat
- Area^{1}: 4.94 km^{2} (1.91 sq mi)
- Highest elevation: 491 m (1,611 ft)
- Lowest elevation: 250 m (820 ft)
- Population (2023): 335
  - Density: 67.8/km^{2} (176/sq mi)
- Time zone: UTC+01:00 (CET)
  - Summer (DST): UTC+02:00 (CEST)
- INSEE/Postal code: 39407 /39230
- ^{1} French Land Register data, which excludes lakes, ponds, glaciers > 1 km^{2} (0.386 sq mi or 247 acres) and river estuaries.

Passenans (French pronunciation: [pasnɑ̃]) is a commune in the Jura department in Bourgogne-Franche-Comté in eastern France.

== Population ==
Historical population
Year	Pop.	±% p.a.
1968	324	—
1975	329	+0.22%
1982	305	−1.08%
1990	281	−1.02%
1999	296	+0.58%
2007	305	+0.38%
2012	344	+2.44%
2017	345	+0.06%
2023	335	−0.49%
Source: INSEE

== See also ==
- Communes of the Jura department
