= Largillay-Marsonnay =

Commune in Bourgogne-Franche-Comté, France

- Commune
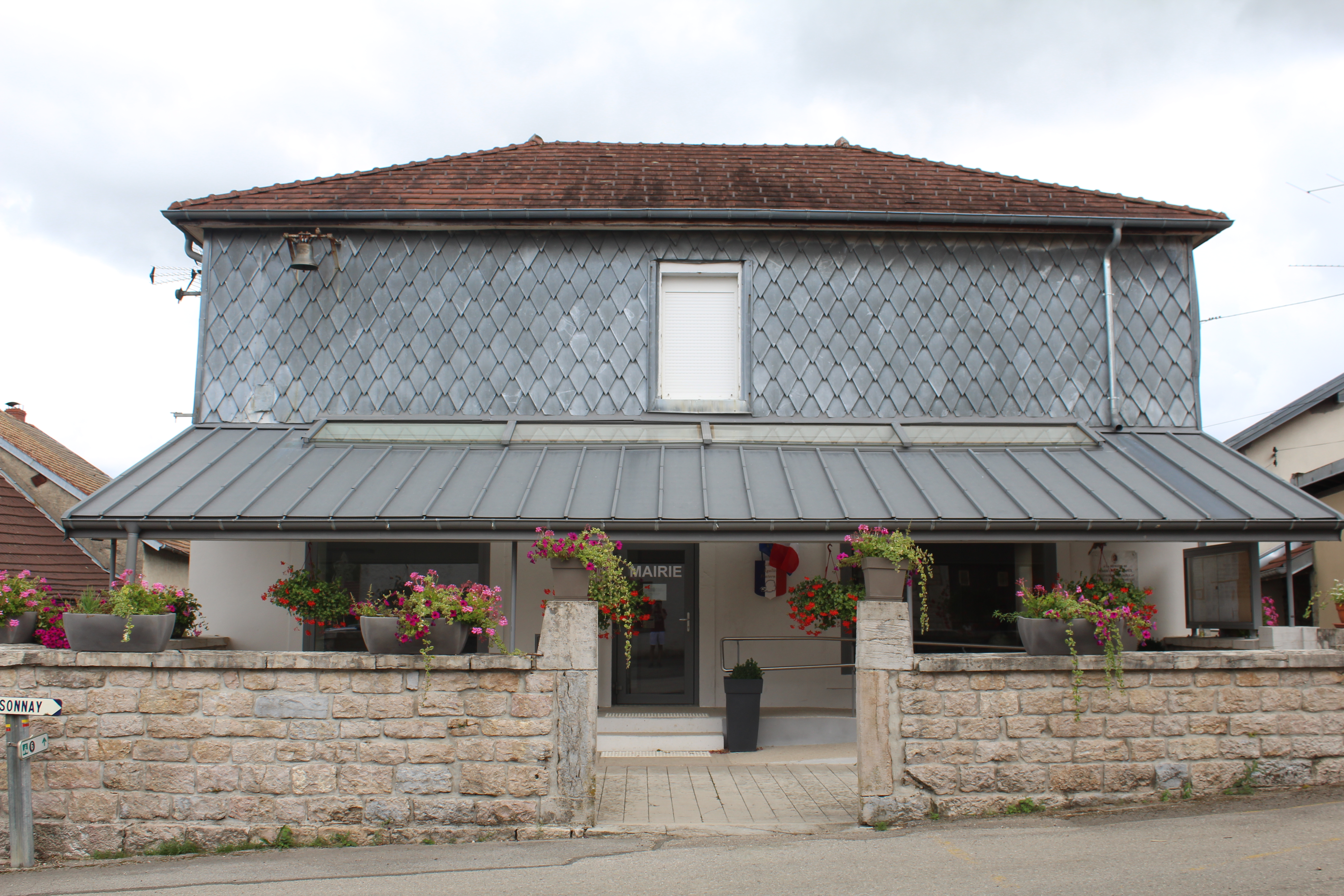
- The town hall in Largillay-Marsonnay
- Location of Largillay-Marsonnay
- Location within France Location within Bourgogne-Franche-Comté
- Coordinates: 46°33′19″N 5°40′34″E
- Country: France
- Region: Bourgogne-Franche-Comté
- Department: Jura
- Arrondissement: Lons-le-Saunier
- Canton: Saint-Laurent-en-Grandvaux

Government
  - Mayor (2020–2026): Christophe Germain
- Area^{1}: 6.98 km^{2} (2.69 sq mi)
- Highest elevation: 680 m (2,230 ft)
- Lowest elevation: 425 m (1,394 ft)
- Population (2023): 128
  - Density: 18.3/km^{2} (47.5/sq mi)
- Time zone: UTC+01:00 (CET)
  - Summer (DST): UTC+02:00 (CEST)
- INSEE/Postal code: 39278 /39130
- ^{1} French Land Register data, which excludes lakes, ponds, glaciers > 1 km^{2} (0.386 sq mi or 247 acres) and river estuaries.

Largillay-Marsonnay is a commune in the Jura department in Bourgogne-Franche-Comté in eastern France. It is near the Swiss border and is located next to the River Ain. The commune also has a shape which resembles the shape of Bulgaria.

== Economy ==
Largillay-Marsonnay has a fairly large tourism industry, with many tourists going to Les Marmites, Fruitière 1900 and Le Louisiane. Before it had an established tourism industry, it was an industrial village, with a small established factory within it.

== Population ==
Historical population
Year	Pop.	±% p.a.
1968	146	—
1975	140	−0.60%
1982	129	−1.16%
1990	121	−0.80%
1999	134	+1.14%
2007	178	+3.61%
2012	181	+0.33%
2017	153	−3.31%
2023	128	−2.93%
Source: INSEE

== See also ==
- Communes of the Jura department
- Communes of France
