= La Favière =

Commune in Bourgogne-Franche-Comté, France

- Commune
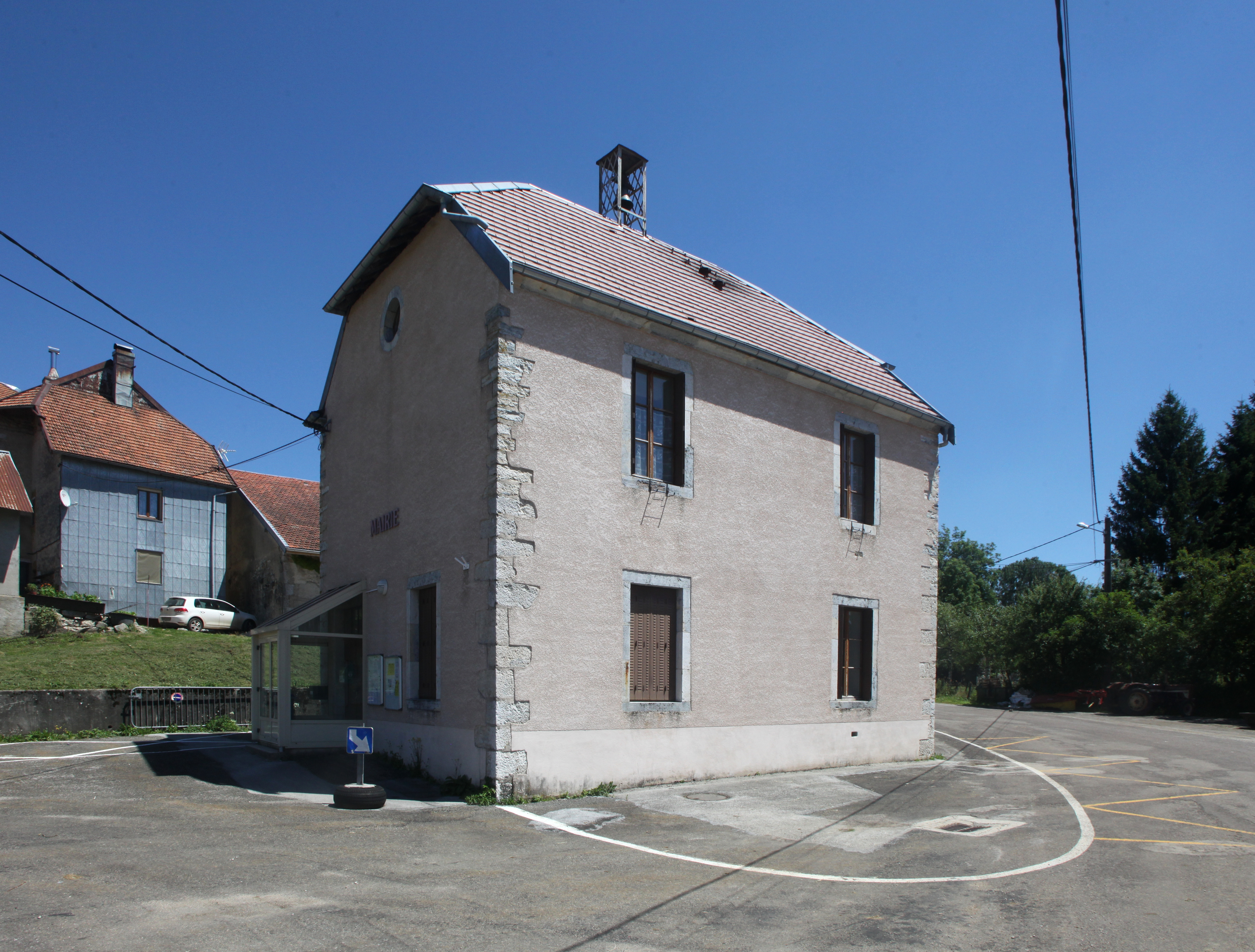
- The town hall in La Favière

- Coat of arms
- Location of La Favière
- Location within France Location within Bourgogne-Franche-Comté
- Coordinates: 46°45′13″N 6°02′02″E
- Country: France
- Region: Bourgogne-Franche-Comté
- Department: Jura
- Arrondissement: Lons-le-Saunier
- Canton: Saint-Laurent-en-Grandvaux

Government
  - Mayor (2020–2026): Christophe Petetin
- Area^{1}: 2.78 km^{2} (1.07 sq mi)
- Highest elevation: 885 m (2,904 ft)
- Lowest elevation: 725 m (2,379 ft)
- Population (2023): 33
  - Density: 12/km^{2} (31/sq mi)
- Time zone: UTC+01:00 (CET)
  - Summer (DST): UTC+02:00 (CEST)
- INSEE/Postal code: 39221 /39250
- ^{1} French Land Register data, which excludes lakes, ponds, glaciers > 1 km^{2} (0.386 sq mi or 247 acres) and river estuaries.

La Favière (French pronunciation: [la favjɛʁ]) is a commune in the Jura department in Bourgogne-Franche-Comté in eastern France.

== Population ==
Historical population
Year	Pop.	±% p.a.
1968	45	—
1975	54	+2.64%
1982	46	−2.26%
1990	30	−5.20%
1999	29	−0.38%
2007	32	+1.24%
2012	28	−2.64%
2017	28	+0.00%
2023	33	+2.78%
Source: INSEE

== See also ==
- Communes of the Jura department
