= Saffloz =

Commune in Bourgogne-Franche-Comté, France

- Commune
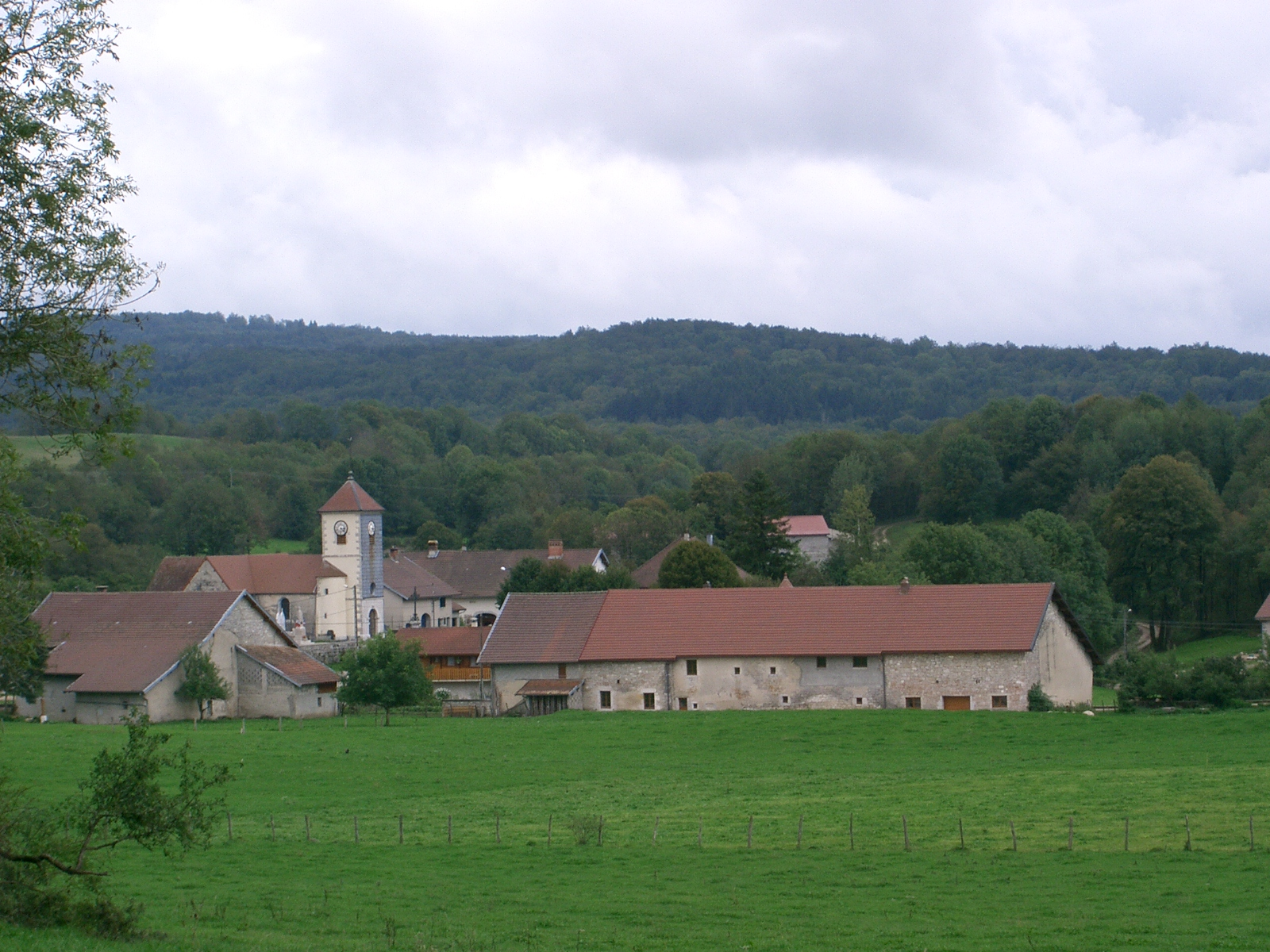
- A general view of Saffloz
- Location of Saffloz
- Location within France Location within Bourgogne-Franche-Comté
- Coordinates: 46°40′12″N 5°50′56″E
- Country: France
- Region: Bourgogne-Franche-Comté
- Department: Jura
- Arrondissement: Lons-le-Saunier
- Canton: Saint-Laurent-en-Grandvaux

Government
  - Mayor (2020–2026): Patrick Vuittenez
- Area^{1}: 8.65 km^{2} (3.34 sq mi)
- Highest elevation: 815 m (2,674 ft)
- Lowest elevation: 619 m (2,031 ft)
- Population (2023): 91
  - Density: 11/km^{2} (27/sq mi)
- Time zone: UTC+01:00 (CET)
  - Summer (DST): UTC+02:00 (CEST)
- INSEE/Postal code: 39473 /39130
- ^{1} French Land Register data, which excludes lakes, ponds, glaciers > 1 km^{2} (0.386 sq mi or 247 acres) and river estuaries.

Saffloz (French pronunciation: [saflo]; Arpitan: Saifloz) is a commune in the Jura department in the Bourgogne-Franche-Comté region in eastern France.

== Population ==
Historical population
Year	Pop.	±% p.a.
1968	98	—
1975	75	−3.75%
1982	75	+0.00%
1990	85	+1.58%
1999	87	+0.26%
2007	93	+0.84%
2012	105	+2.46%
2017	102	−0.58%
2023	91	−1.88%
Source: INSEE

== See also ==
- Communes of the Jura department
