= Lombard, Jura =

Commune in Bourgogne-Franche-Comté, France

Lombard
- Commune
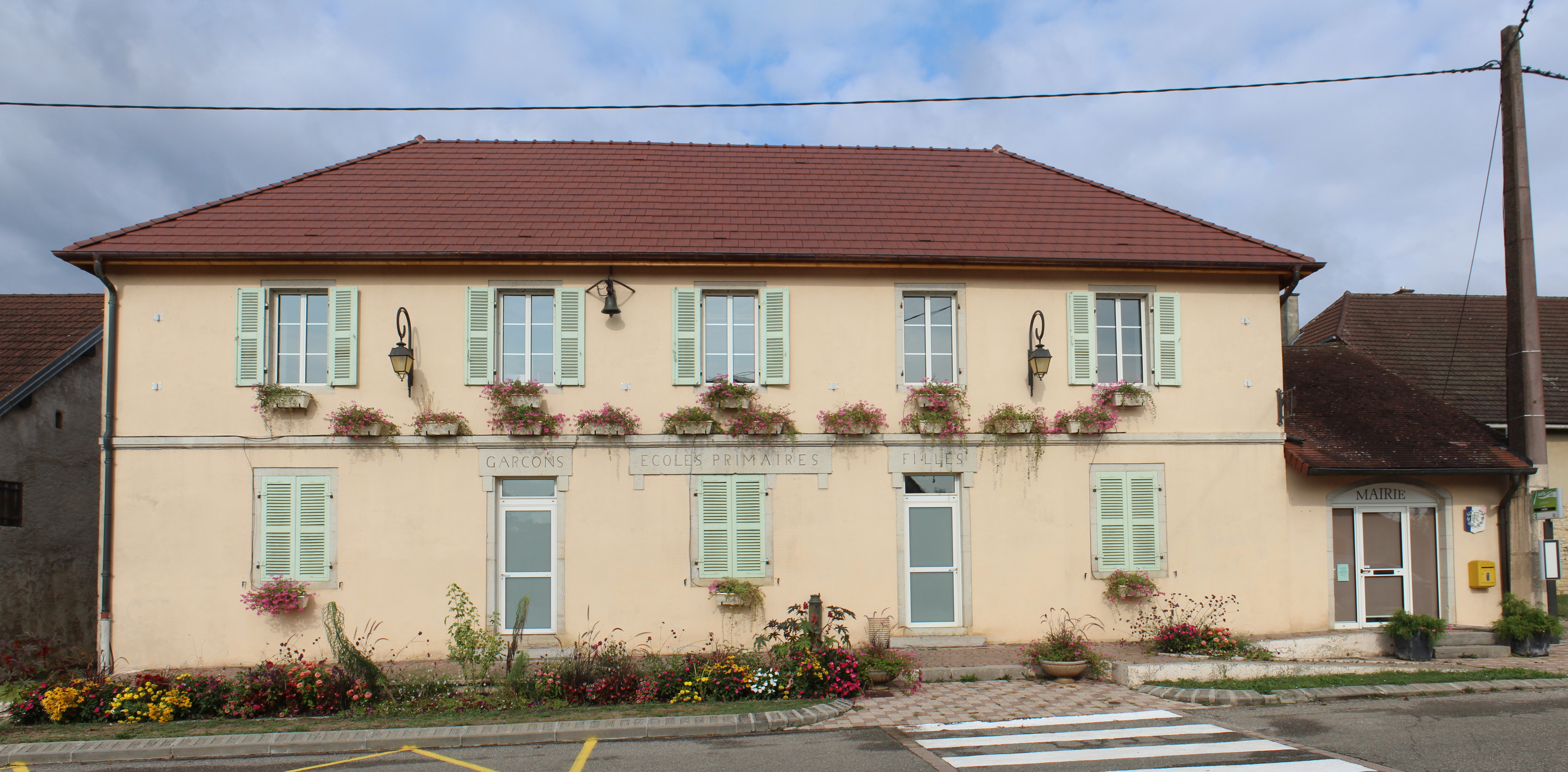
- The town hall in Lombard

- Coat of arms
- Location of Lombard
- Location within France Location within Bourgogne-Franche-Comté
- Coordinates: 46°47′11″N 5°30′30″E
- Country: France
- Region: Bourgogne-Franche-Comté
- Department: Jura
- Arrondissement: Lons-le-Saunier
- Canton: Bletterans

Government
  - Mayor (2020–2026): Sylvie Faudot
- Area^{1}: 5.41 km^{2} (2.09 sq mi)
- Highest elevation: 253 m (830 ft)
- Lowest elevation: 209 m (686 ft)
- Population (2023): 220
  - Density: 41/km^{2} (110/sq mi)
- Time zone: UTC+01:00 (CET)
  - Summer (DST): UTC+02:00 (CEST)
- INSEE/Postal code: 39296 /39230
- ^{1} French Land Register data, which excludes lakes, ponds, glaciers > 1 km^{2} (0.386 sq mi or 247 acres) and river estuaries.

Lombard (French pronunciation: [lɔ̃baʁ]) is a commune in the Jura department in Bourgogne-Franche-Comté in eastern France.

== Population ==
Historical population
Year	Pop.	±% p.a.
1968	132	—
1975	118	−1.59%
1982	125	+0.83%
1990	148	+2.13%
1999	129	−1.52%
2007	169	+3.43%
2012	192	+2.58%
2017	211	+1.91%
2023	220	+0.70%
Source: INSEE

== See also ==
- Communes of the Jura department
