= Cerniébaud =

Commune in Bourgogne-Franche-Comté, France

- Commune
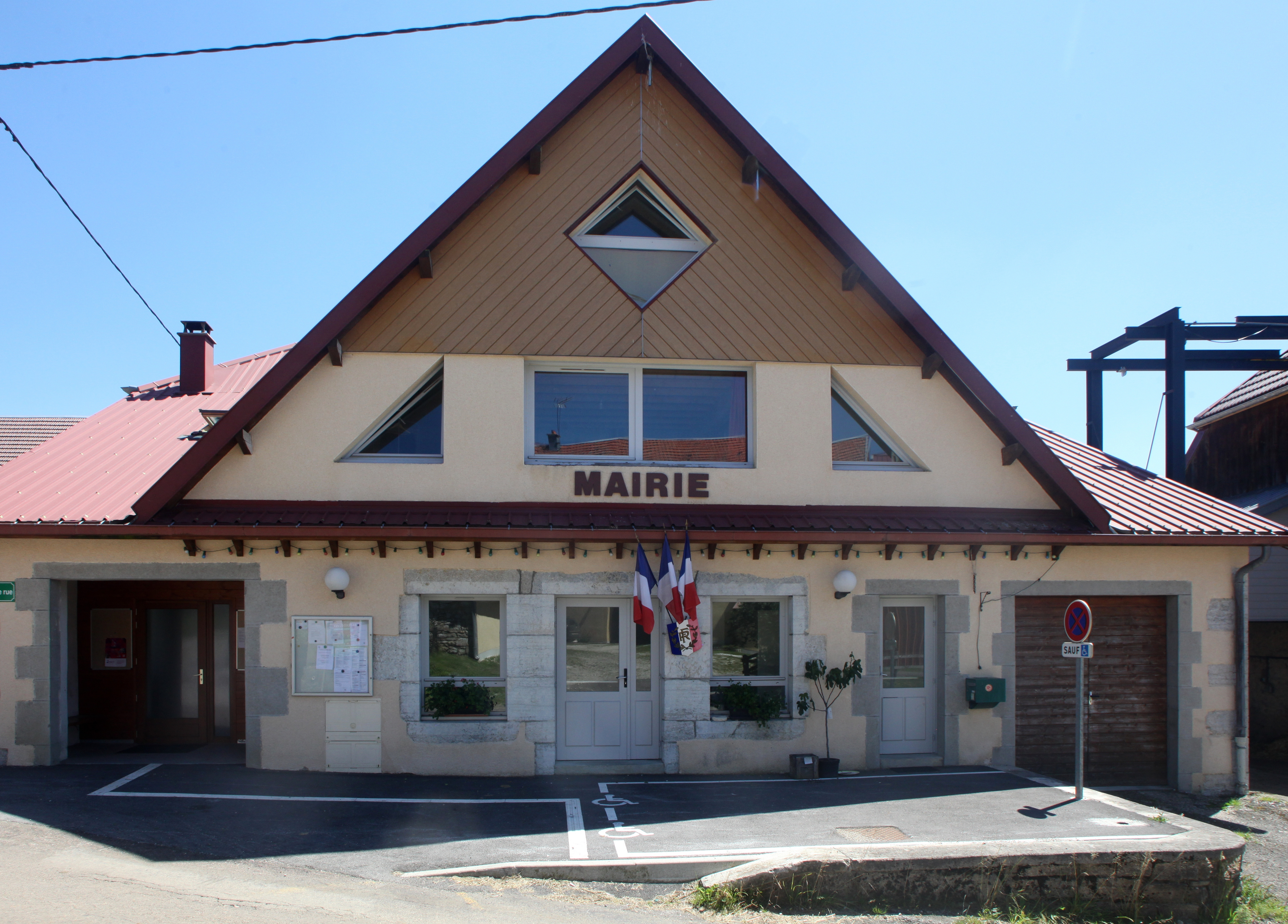
- The town hall in Cerniébaud
- Location of Cerniébaud
- Location within France Location within Bourgogne-Franche-Comté
- Coordinates: 46°44′00″N 6°06′16″E
- Country: France
- Region: Bourgogne-Franche-Comté
- Department: Jura
- Arrondissement: Lons-le-Saunier
- Canton: Saint-Laurent-en-Grandvaux

Government
  - Mayor (2020–2026): David Alpy
- Area^{1}: 10.53 km^{2} (4.07 sq mi)
- Highest elevation: 1,237 m (4,058 ft)
- Lowest elevation: 926 m (3,038 ft)
- Population (2023): 91
  - Density: 8.6/km^{2} (22/sq mi)
- Time zone: UTC+01:00 (CET)
  - Summer (DST): UTC+02:00 (CEST)
- INSEE/Postal code: 39085 /39250
- ^{1} French Land Register data, which excludes lakes, ponds, glaciers > 1 km^{2} (0.386 sq mi or 247 acres) and river estuaries.

Cerniébaud (French pronunciation: [sɛʁnjebo]) is a commune in the Jura department in Bourgogne-Franche-Comté in eastern France.

== Population ==
Historical population
| Year | Pop. | ±% p.a. |
|---|---|---|
| 1968 | 74 | — |
| 1975 | 65 | −1.84% |
| 1982 | 55 | −2.36% |
| 1990 | 49 | −1.43% |
| 1999 | 53 | +0.88% |
| 2007 | 64 | +2.39% |
| 2012 | 76 | +3.50% |
| 2017 | 88 | +2.98% |
| 2023 | 91 | +0.56% |
Source: INSEE

== See also ==
- Communes of the Jura department
