= Gillois =

Commune in Bourgogne-Franche-Comté, France

- Commune
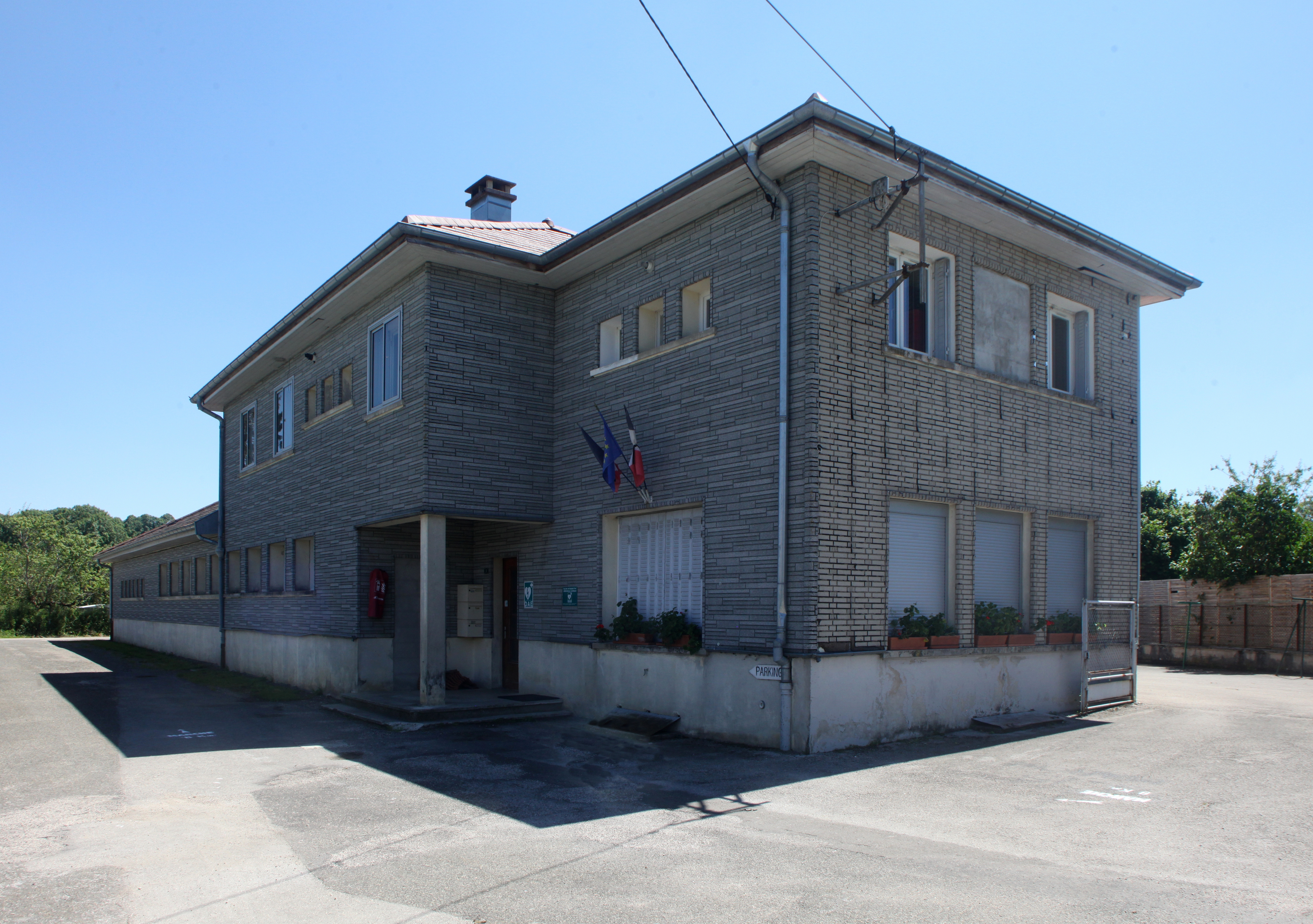
- The town hall in Gillois
- Location of Gillois
- Location within France Location within Bourgogne-Franche-Comté
- Coordinates: 46°44′07″N 6°01′10″E
- Country: France
- Region: Bourgogne-Franche-Comté
- Department: Jura
- Arrondissement: Lons-le-Saunier
- Canton: Saint-Laurent-en-Grandvaux

Government
  - Mayor (2020–2026): Emmanuel Ferreux
- Area^{1}: 9.65 km^{2} (3.73 sq mi)
- Highest elevation: 957 m (3,140 ft)
- Lowest elevation: 690 m (2,260 ft)
- Population (2023): 124
  - Density: 12.8/km^{2} (33.3/sq mi)
- Time zone: UTC+01:00 (CET)
  - Summer (DST): UTC+02:00 (CEST)
- INSEE/Postal code: 39254 /39250
- ^{1} French Land Register data, which excludes lakes, ponds, glaciers > 1 km^{2} (0.386 sq mi or 247 acres) and river estuaries.

Gillois is a commune in the Jura department in Bourgogne-Franche-Comté in eastern France.

== Population ==
Historical population
Year	Pop.	±% p.a.
1968	141	—
1975	127	−1.48%
1982	130	+0.33%
1990	115	−1.52%
1999	119	+0.38%
2007	145	+2.50%
2012	122	−3.40%
2017	136	+2.20%
2023	124	−1.53%
Source: INSEE

== See also ==
- Communes of the Jura department
