= Desnes, Jura =

Commune in Bourgogne-Franche-Comté, France

Desnes
- Commune
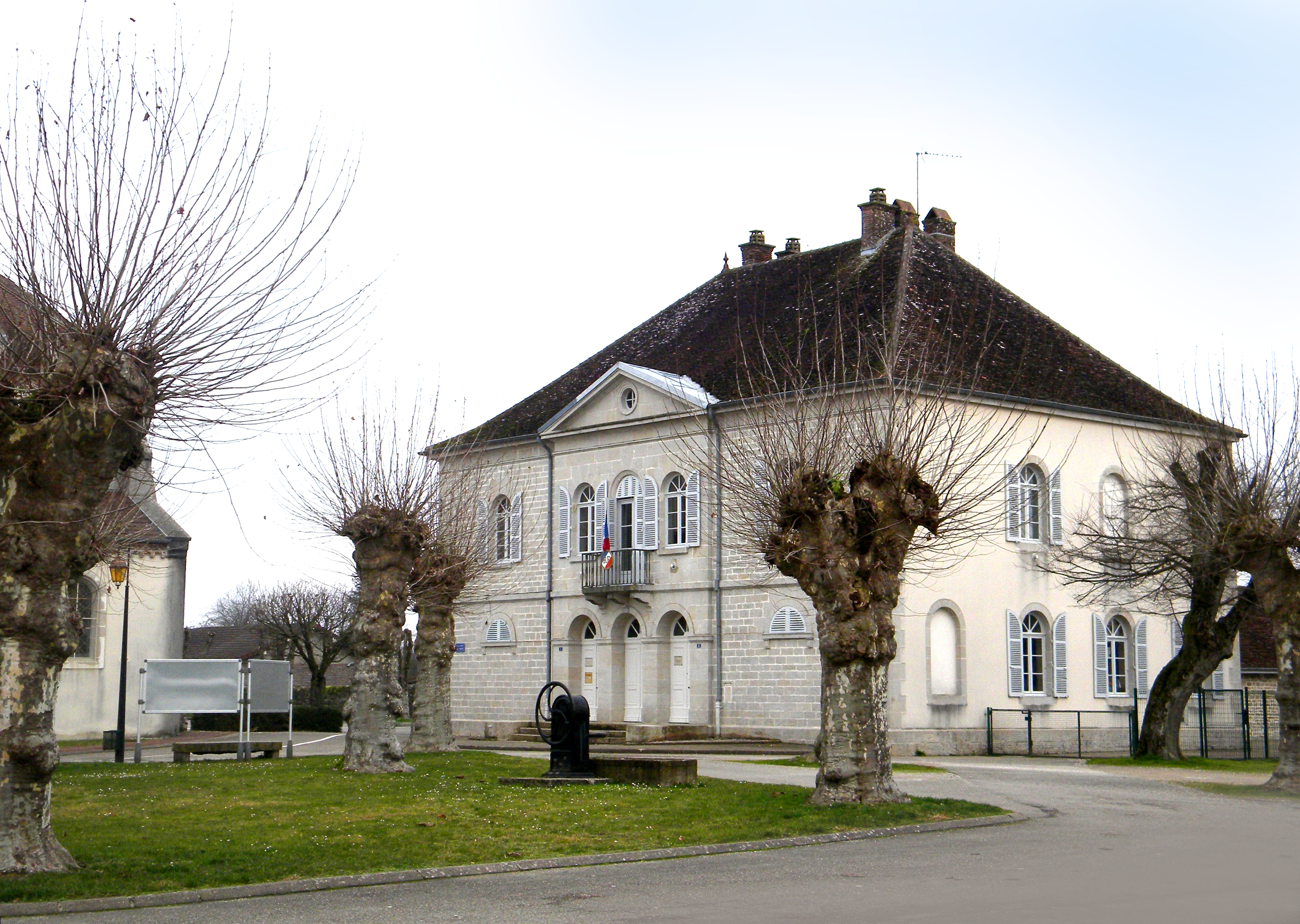
- The town hall in Desnes
- Location of Desnes
- Location within France Location within Bourgogne-Franche-Comté
- Coordinates: 46°45′54″N 5°28′27″E
- Country: France
- Region: Bourgogne-Franche-Comté
- Department: Jura
- Arrondissement: Lons-le-Saunier
- Canton: Bletterans

Government
  - Mayor (2020–2026): Fabrice Grimaut
- Area^{1}: 9.06 km^{2} (3.50 sq mi)
- Highest elevation: 226 m (741 ft)
- Lowest elevation: 201 m (659 ft)
- Population (2023): 494
  - Density: 54.5/km^{2} (141/sq mi)
- Time zone: UTC+01:00 (CET)
  - Summer (DST): UTC+02:00 (CEST)
- INSEE/Postal code: 39194 /39140
- ^{1} French Land Register data, which excludes lakes, ponds, glaciers > 1 km^{2} (0.386 sq mi or 247 acres) and river estuaries.

Desnes (French pronunciation: [dɛn]) is a commune in the Jura department in Bourgogne-Franche-Comté in eastern France.

== See also ==
- Communes of the Jura department
