= Doye =

Commune in Bourgogne-Franche-Comté, France

- Commune
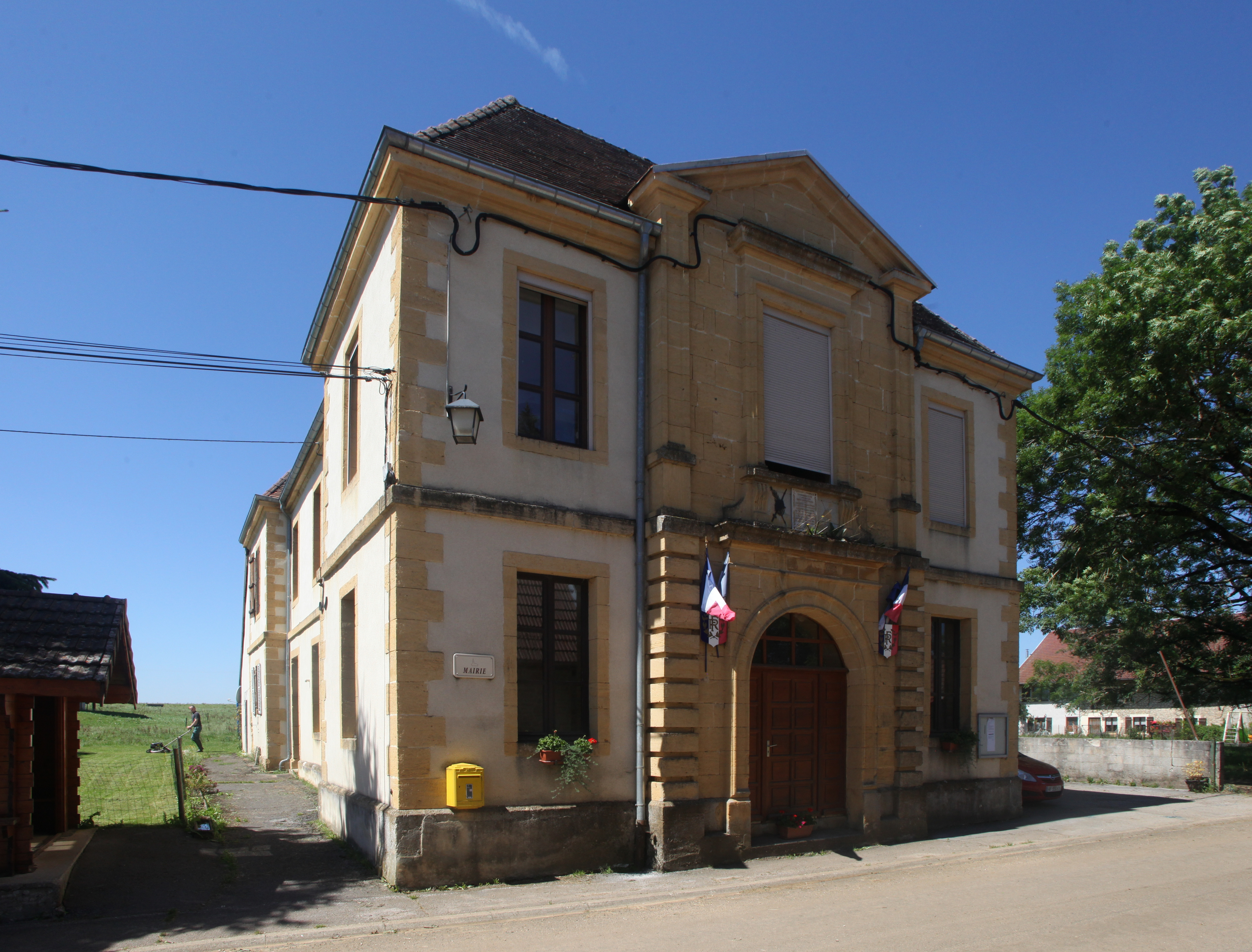
- The town hall in Doye
- Location of Doye
- Location within France Location within Bourgogne-Franche-Comté
- Coordinates: 46°46′02″N 6°01′01″E
- Country: France
- Region: Bourgogne-Franche-Comté
- Department: Jura
- Arrondissement: Lons-le-Saunier
- Canton: Saint-Laurent-en-Grandvaux

Government
  - Mayor (2020–2026): Jean-Paul Leblond
- Area^{1}: 3.56 km^{2} (1.37 sq mi)
- Highest elevation: 801 m (2,628 ft)
- Lowest elevation: 630 m (2,070 ft)
- Population (2023): 110
  - Density: 31/km^{2} (80/sq mi)
- Time zone: UTC+01:00 (CET)
  - Summer (DST): UTC+02:00 (CEST)
- INSEE/Postal code: 39203 /39250
- ^{1} French Land Register data, which excludes lakes, ponds, glaciers > 1 km^{2} (0.386 sq mi or 247 acres) and river estuaries.

Doye (French pronunciation: [dwa]) is a commune in the Jura department in Bourgogne-Franche-Comté in eastern France.

== Population ==
Historical population
Year	Pop.	±% p.a.
1968	106	—
1975	94	−1.70%
1982	87	−1.10%
1990	76	−1.68%
1999	69	−1.07%
2007	79	+1.71%
2012	105	+5.86%
2017	101	−0.77%
2023	110	+1.43%
Source: INSEE

== See also ==
- Communes of the Jura department
