= Nance, Jura =

Commune in Bourgogne-Franche-Comté, France

Nance
- Commune
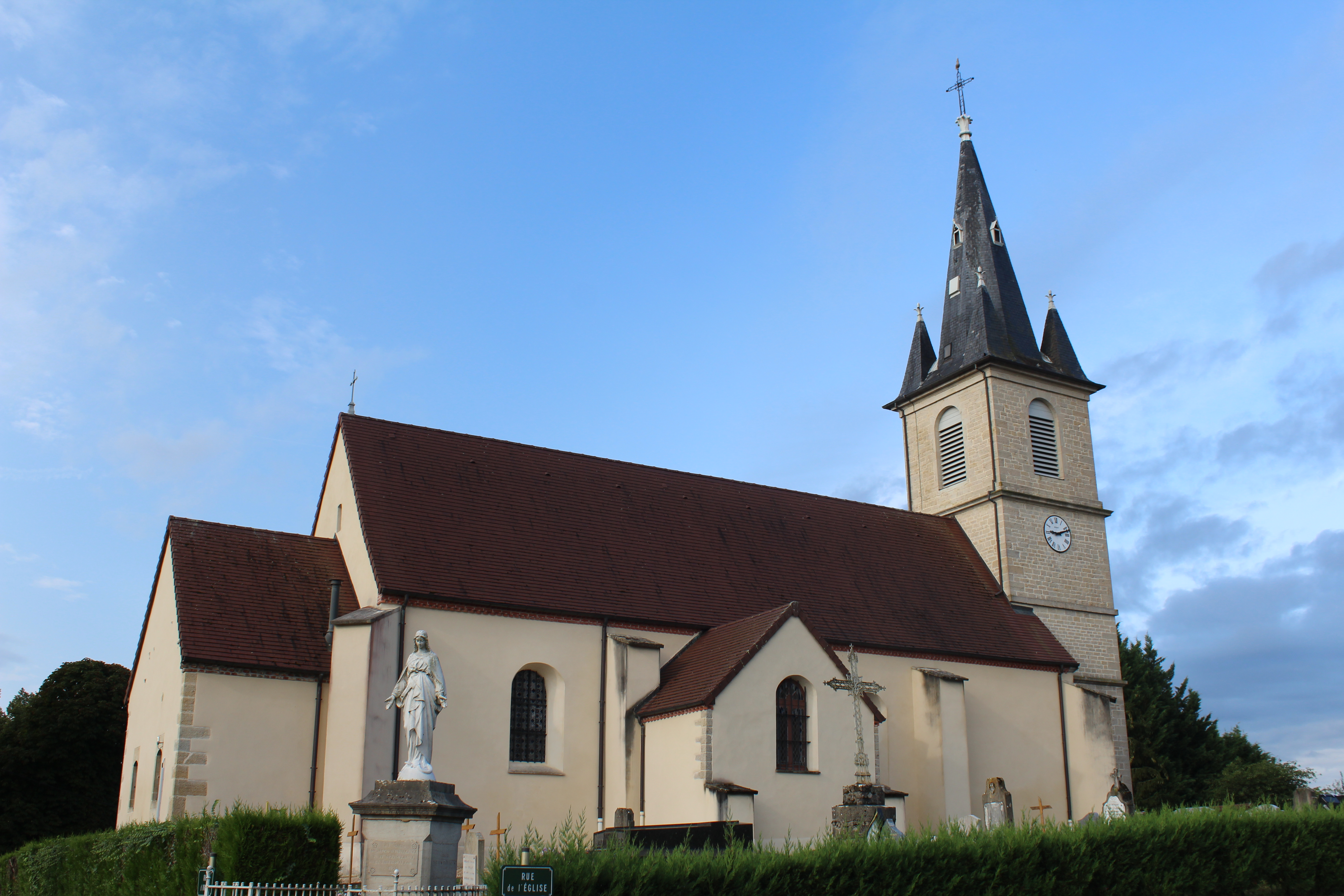
- The church in Nance
- Location of Nance
- Location within France Location within Bourgogne-Franche-Comté
- Coordinates: 46°44′26″N 5°25′37″E
- Country: France
- Region: Bourgogne-Franche-Comté
- Department: Jura
- Arrondissement: Lons-le-Saunier
- Canton: Bletterans

Government
  - Mayor (2020–2026): Pierre Roy
- Area^{1}: 7.34 km^{2} (2.83 sq mi)
- Highest elevation: 222 m (728 ft)
- Lowest elevation: 191 m (627 ft)
- Population (2023): 544
  - Density: 74.1/km^{2} (192/sq mi)
- Time zone: UTC+01:00 (CET)
  - Summer (DST): UTC+02:00 (CEST)
- INSEE/Postal code: 39379 /39140
- ^{1} French Land Register data, which excludes lakes, ponds, glaciers > 1 km^{2} (0.386 sq mi or 247 acres) and river estuaries.

Nance (French pronunciation: [nɑ̃s]) is a commune in the Jura department in Bourgogne-Franche-Comté in eastern France.

== Population ==
Historical population
Year	Pop.	±% p.a.
1968	247	—
1975	280	+1.81%
1982	330	+2.37%
1990	395	+2.27%
1999	429	+0.92%
2007	467	+1.07%
2012	497	+1.25%
2017	519	+0.87%
2023	544	+0.79%
Source: INSEE

== See also ==
- Communes of the Jura department
