= Barésia-sur-l'Ain =

Commune in Bourgogne-Franche-Comté, France

- Commune
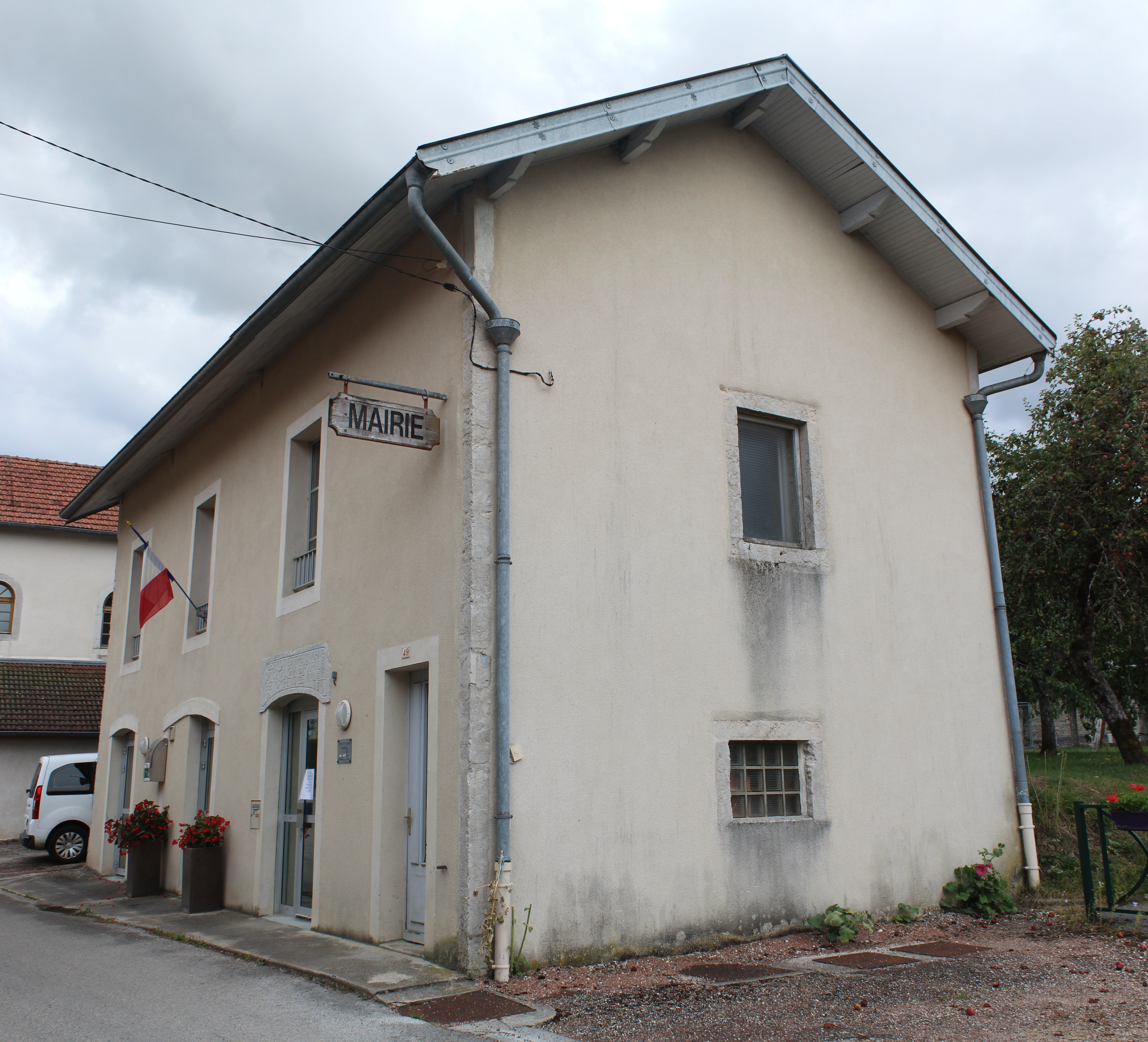
- The town hall in Barésia-sur-l'Ain
- Location of Barésia-sur-l'Ain
- Location within France Location within Bourgogne-Franche-Comté
- Coordinates: 46°33′00″N 5°42′43″E
- Country: France
- Region: Bourgogne-Franche-Comté
- Department: Jura
- Arrondissement: Lons-le-Saunier
- Canton: Saint-Laurent-en-Grandvaux

Government
  - Mayor (2020–2026): Franck Hugonnet
- Area^{1}: 9.39 km^{2} (3.63 sq mi)
- Highest elevation: 567 m (1,860 ft)
- Lowest elevation: 423 m (1,388 ft)
- Population (2023): 163
  - Density: 17.4/km^{2} (45.0/sq mi)
- Time zone: UTC+01:00 (CET)
  - Summer (DST): UTC+02:00 (CEST)
- INSEE/Postal code: 39038 /39130
- ^{1} French Land Register data, which excludes lakes, ponds, glaciers > 1 km^{2} (0.386 sq mi or 247 acres) and river estuaries.

Barésia-sur-l'Ain (French pronunciation: [baʁezja syʁ lɛ̃], literally Barésia on the Ain) is a commune in the Jura department in the region of Bourgogne-Franche-Comté in eastern France.

== Population ==
Historical population
Year	Pop.	±% p.a.
1968	83	—
1975	55	−5.71%
1982	49	−1.64%
1990	62	+2.99%
1999	98	+5.22%
2007	140	+4.56%
2012	152	+1.66%
2017	150	−0.26%
2023	163	+1.39%
Source: INSEE

== See also ==
- Communes of the Jura department
