= Conte, Jura =

Commune in Bourgogne-Franche-Comté, France

Conte
- Commune
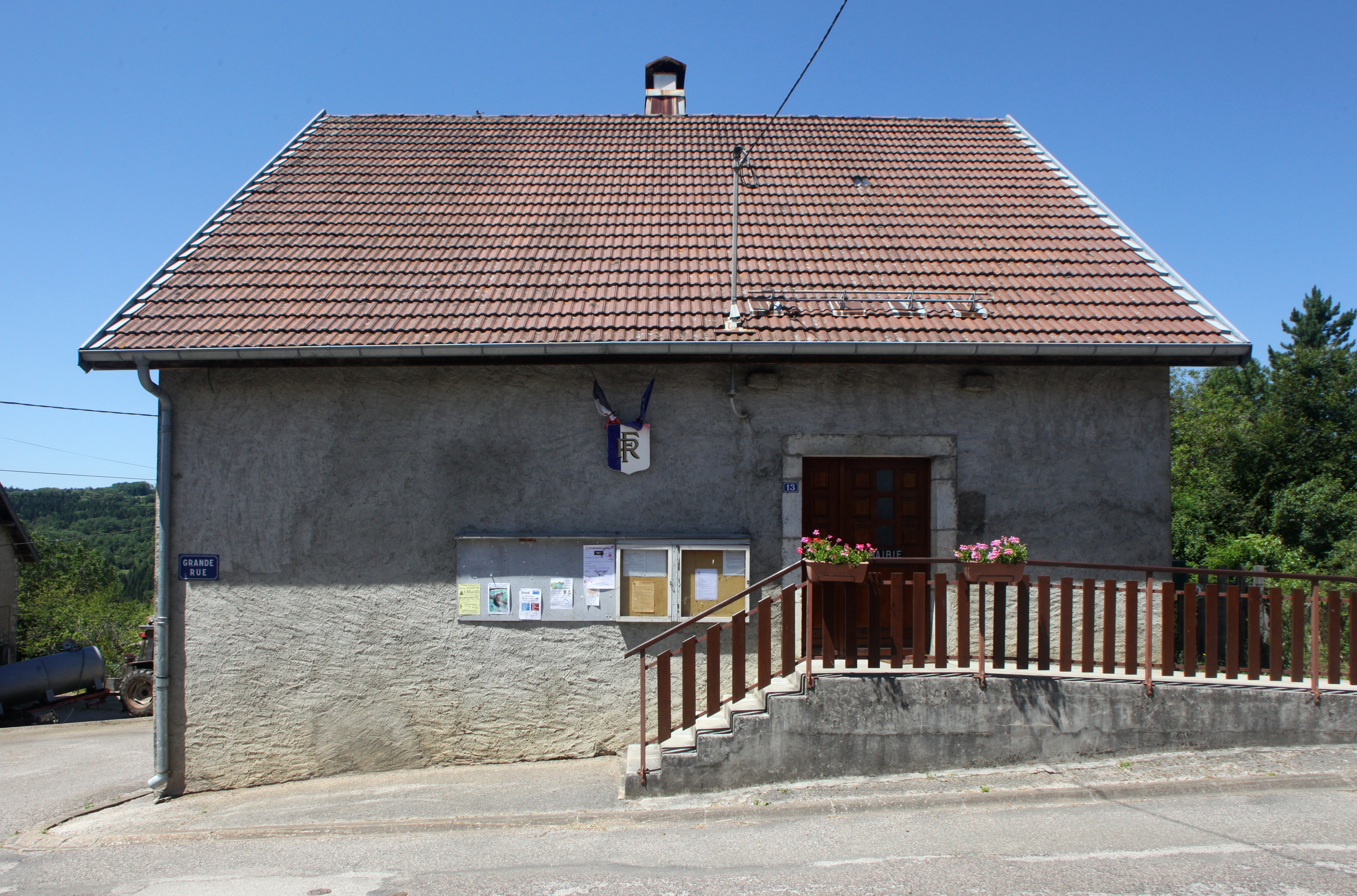
- The town hall in Conte
- Location of Conte
- Location within France Location within Bourgogne-Franche-Comté
- Coordinates: 46°44′57″N 6°00′05″E
- Country: France
- Region: Bourgogne-Franche-Comté
- Department: Jura
- Arrondissement: Lons-le-Saunier
- Canton: Saint-Laurent-en-Grandvaux

Government
  - Mayor (2020–2026): Alexandre Gobet
- Area^{1}: 3.32 km^{2} (1.28 sq mi)
- Highest elevation: 801 m (2,628 ft)
- Lowest elevation: 614 m (2,014 ft)
- Population (2023): 58
  - Density: 17/km^{2} (45/sq mi)
- Time zone: UTC+01:00 (CET)
  - Summer (DST): UTC+02:00 (CEST)
- INSEE/Postal code: 39165 /39300
- ^{1} French Land Register data, which excludes lakes, ponds, glaciers > 1 km^{2} (0.386 sq mi or 247 acres) and river estuaries.

Conte (French pronunciation: [kɔ̃t]) is a commune in the Jura department in Bourgogne-Franche-Comté in eastern France.

== Population ==
Historical population
Year	Pop.	±% p.a.
1968	39	—
1975	44	+1.74%
1982	51	+2.13%
1990	48	−0.75%
1999	56	+1.73%
2007	62	+1.28%
2012	61	−0.32%
2017	56	−1.70%
2023	58	+0.59%
Source: INSEE

== See also ==
- Communes of the Jura department
