= Chêne-Sec =

Commune in Bourgogne-Franche-Comté, France

- Commune
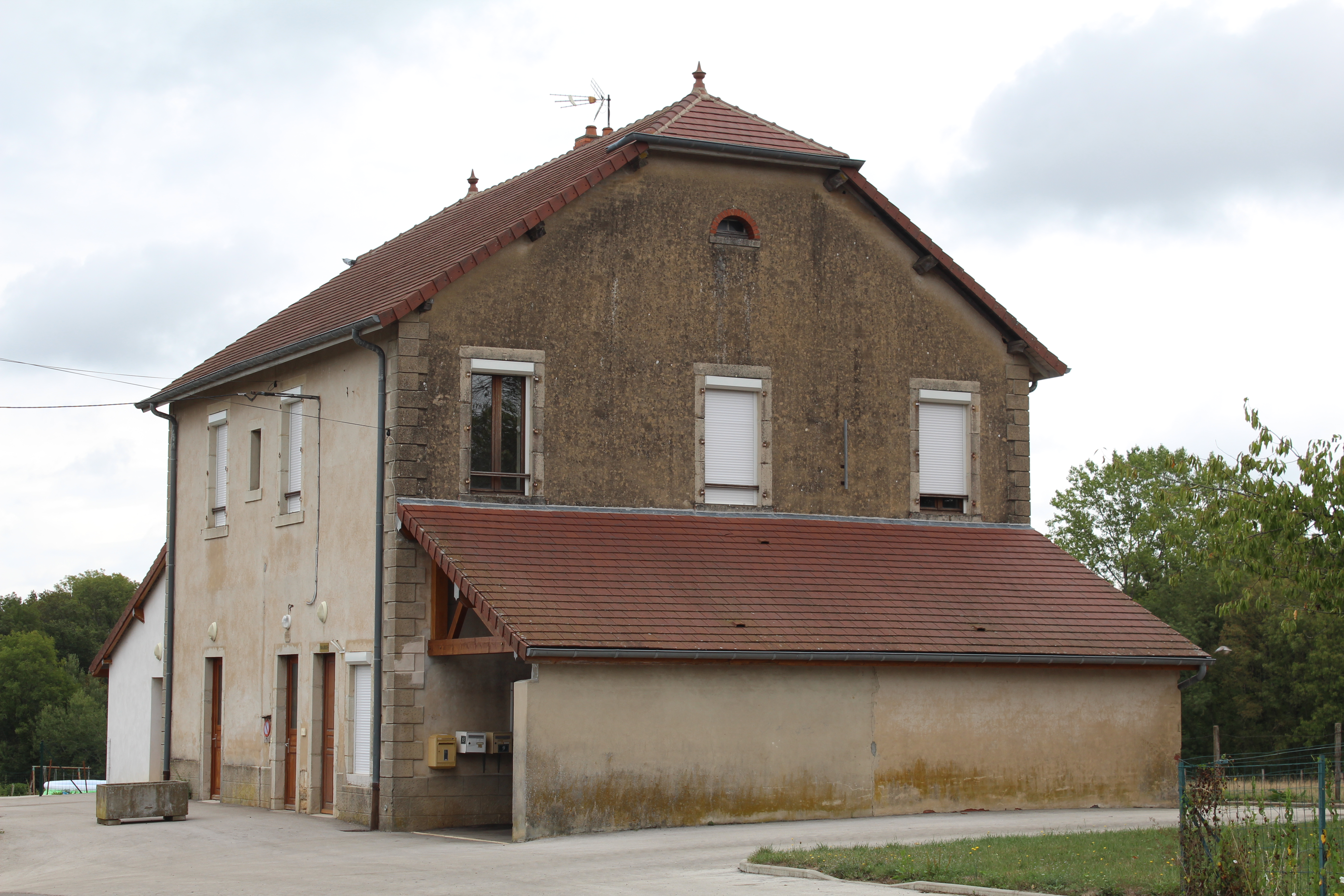
- The town hall in Chêne-Sec
- Location of Chêne-Sec
- Location within France Location within Bourgogne-Franche-Comté
- Coordinates: 46°51′05″N 5°26′30″E
- Country: France
- Region: Bourgogne-Franche-Comté
- Department: Jura
- Arrondissement: Lons-le-Saunier
- Canton: Bletterans

Government
  - Mayor (2020–2026): Pierre Chanois
- Area^{1}: 0.76 km^{2} (0.29 sq mi)
- Highest elevation: 216 m (709 ft)
- Lowest elevation: 193 m (633 ft)
- Population (2023): 39
  - Density: 51/km^{2} (130/sq mi)
- Time zone: UTC+01:00 (CET)
  - Summer (DST): UTC+02:00 (CEST)
- INSEE/Postal code: 39140 /39230
- ^{1} French Land Register data, which excludes lakes, ponds, glaciers > 1 km^{2} (0.386 sq mi or 247 acres) and river estuaries.

Chêne-Sec (French pronunciation: [ʃɛːn sɛk]) is a commune in the Jura department in Bourgogne-Franche-Comté in eastern France.

== Population ==
Historical population
Year	Pop.	±% p.a.
1968	56	—
1975	40	−4.69%
1982	43	+1.04%
1990	50	+1.90%
1999	53	+0.65%
2007	39	−3.76%
2012	34	−2.71%
2017	36	+1.15%
2023	39	+1.34%
Source: INSEE

== See also ==
- Communes of the Jura department
