= Vers-sous-Sellières =

- Commune
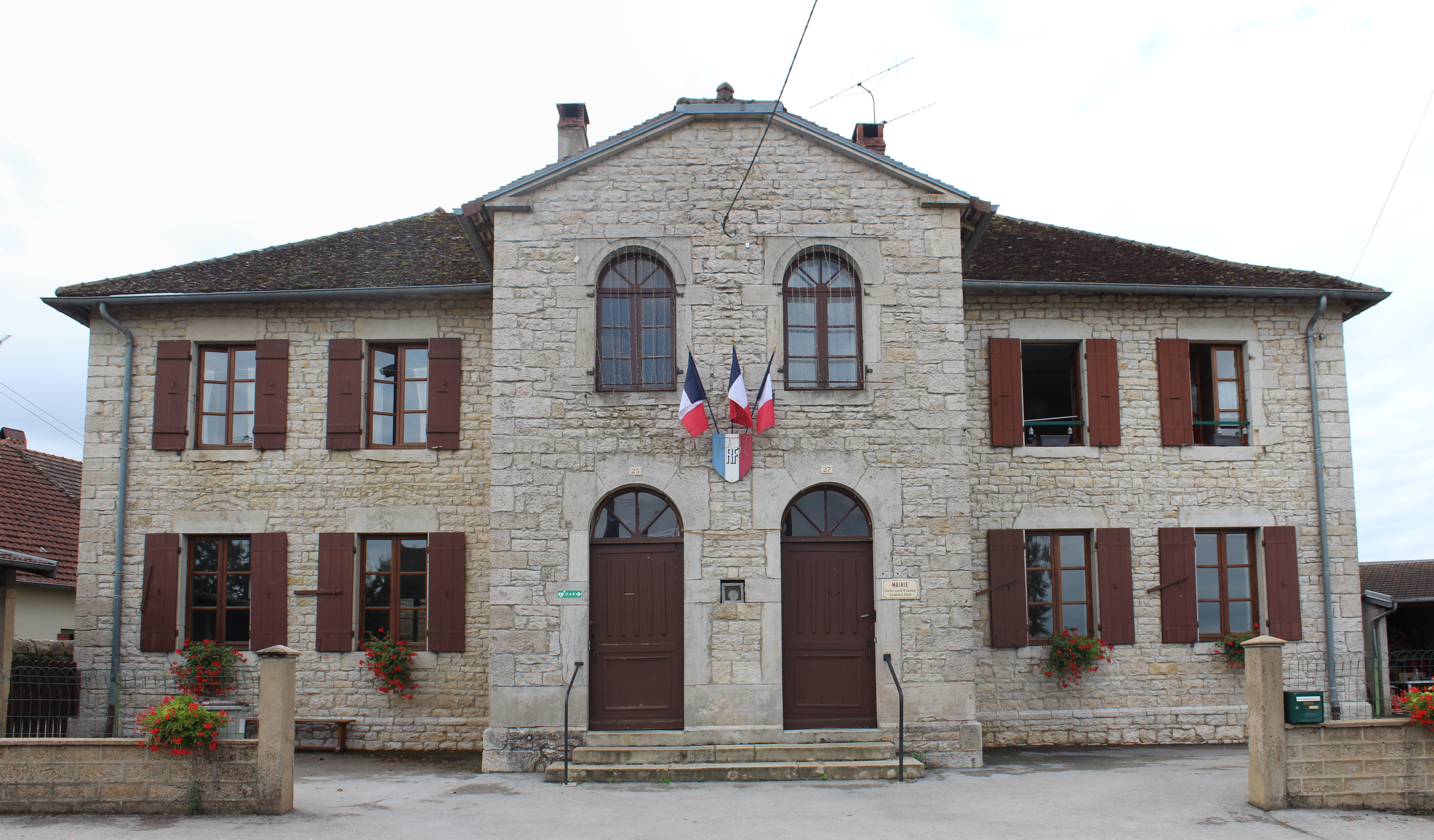
- The town hall in Vers-sous-Sellières
- Location of Vers-sous-Sellières
- Location within France Location within Bourgogne-Franche-Comté
- Coordinates: 46°49′34″N 5°32′09″E
- Country: France
- Region: Bourgogne-Franche-Comté
- Department: Jura
- Arrondissement: Lons-le-Saunier
- Canton: Bletterans

Government
  - Mayor (2020–2026): Jean-Louis Brulebois
- Area^{1}: 8.48 km^{2} (3.27 sq mi)
- Highest elevation: 229 m (751 ft)
- Lowest elevation: 205 m (673 ft)
- Population (2023): 223
  - Density: 26.3/km^{2} (68.1/sq mi)
- Time zone: UTC+01:00 (CET)
  - Summer (DST): UTC+02:00 (CEST)
- INSEE/Postal code: 39555 /39230
- ^{1} French Land Register data, which excludes lakes, ponds, glaciers > 1 km^{2} (0.386 sq mi or 247 acres) and river estuaries.

Vers-sous-Sellières is a commune in the Jura department in the Bourgogne-Franche-Comté region in eastern France.

== Population ==
Historical population
Year	Pop.	±% p.a.
1968	200	—
1975	160	−3.14%
1982	153	−0.64%
1990	163	+0.79%
1999	158	−0.35%
2007	208	+3.50%
2012	230	+2.03%
2017	238	+0.69%
2023	223	−1.08%
Source: INSEE

== See also ==
- Communes of the Jura department
