= Saint-Maurice-Crillat =

Commune in Bourgogne-Franche-Comté, France

- Commune
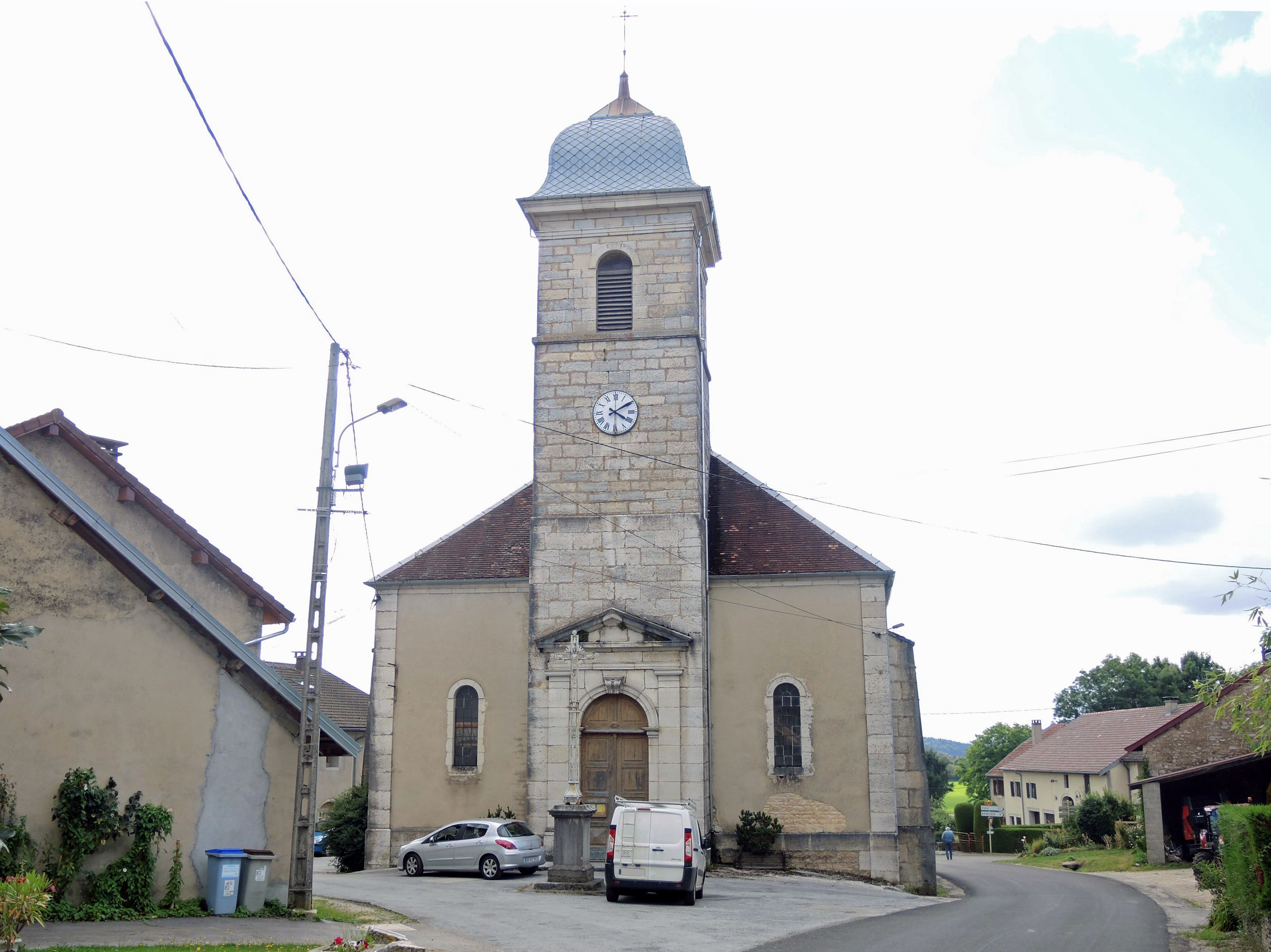
- The church in Saint-Maurice-Crillat

- Coat of arms
- Location of Saint-Maurice-Crillat
- Location within France Location within Bourgogne-Franche-Comté
- Coordinates: 46°34′14″N 5°50′00″E
- Country: France
- Region: Bourgogne-Franche-Comté
- Department: Jura
- Arrondissement: Lons-le-Saunier
- Canton: Saint-Laurent-en-Grandvaux

Government
  - Mayor (2020–2026): Jacqueline Millet
- Area^{1}: 20.79 km^{2} (8.03 sq mi)
- Highest elevation: 1,135 m (3,724 ft)
- Lowest elevation: 579 m (1,900 ft)
- Population (2023): 247
  - Density: 11.9/km^{2} (30.8/sq mi)
- Time zone: UTC+01:00 (CET)
  - Summer (DST): UTC+02:00 (CEST)
- INSEE/Postal code: 39493 /39130
- ^{1} French Land Register data, which excludes lakes, ponds, glaciers > 1 km^{2} (0.386 sq mi or 247 acres) and river estuaries.

Saint-Maurice-Crillat (French pronunciation: [sɛ̃ mɔʁis kʁija]) is a commune in the Jura department in the Bourgogne-Franche-Comté region in eastern France. It was created in 1973 by the merger of two former communes: Saint-Maurice-en-Montagne and Crillat.

== Population ==
Historical population
Year	Pop.	±% p.a.
1968	259	—
1975	220	−2.30%
1982	212	−0.53%
1990	225	+0.75%
1999	209	−0.82%
2007	208	−0.06%
2012	231	+2.12%
2017	242	+0.93%
2023	247	+0.34%
Source: INSEE

== See also ==
- Communes of the Jura department
