= Crans, Jura =

Commune in Bourgogne-Franche-Comté, France

Crans
- Commune
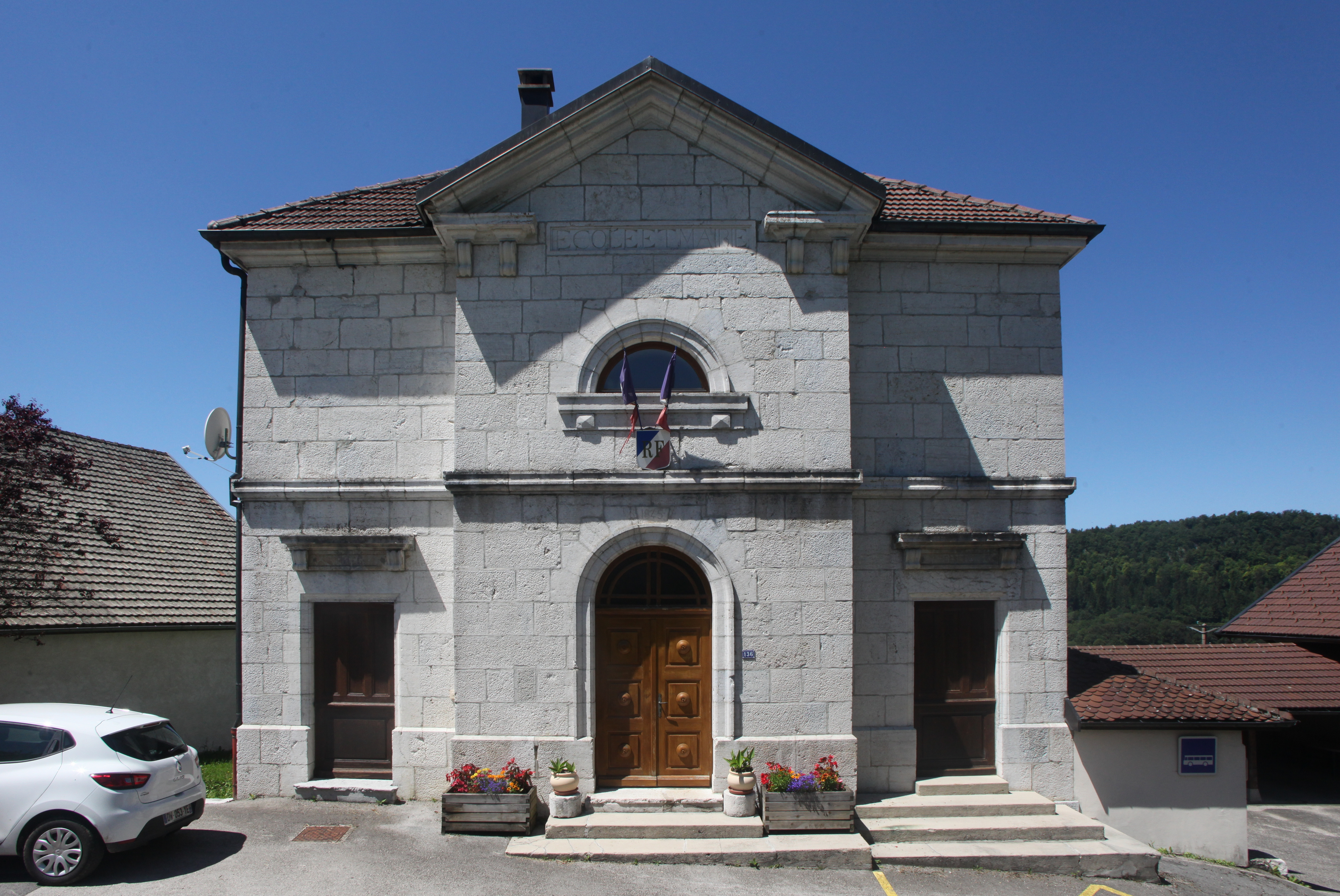
- The town hall in Crans
- Location of Crans
- Location within France Location within Bourgogne-Franche-Comté
- Coordinates: 46°42′19″N 5°58′24″E
- Country: France
- Region: Bourgogne-Franche-Comté
- Department: Jura
- Arrondissement: Lons-le-Saunier
- Canton: Saint-Laurent-en-Grandvaux

Government
  - Mayor (2020–2026): Daniel Roz
- Area^{1}: 9.03 km^{2} (3.49 sq mi)
- Highest elevation: 895 m (2,936 ft)
- Lowest elevation: 624 m (2,047 ft)
- Population (2023): 87
  - Density: 9.6/km^{2} (25/sq mi)
- Time zone: UTC+01:00 (CET)
  - Summer (DST): UTC+02:00 (CEST)
- INSEE/Postal code: 39178 /39300
- ^{1} French Land Register data, which excludes lakes, ponds, glaciers > 1 km^{2} (0.386 sq mi or 247 acres) and river estuaries.

Crans (French pronunciation: [kʁɑ̃]) is a commune in the Jura department in Bourgogne-Franche-Comté in eastern France. As of 2014 estimates, the village has a population of approximately 68 residents.

== Population ==
Historical population
| Year | Pop. | ±% p.a. |
|---|---|---|
| 1968 | 84 | — |
| 1975 | 95 | +1.77% |
| 1982 | 85 | −1.58% |
| 1990 | 72 | −2.05% |
| 1999 | 72 | +0.00% |
| 2007 | 69 | −0.53% |
| 2012 | 66 | −0.89% |
| 2017 | 74 | +2.31% |
| 2023 | 87 | +2.73% |
Source: INSEE

== See also ==
- Communes of the Jura department
