= Rix, Jura =

Commune in Bourgogne-Franche-Comté, France

Rix
- Commune
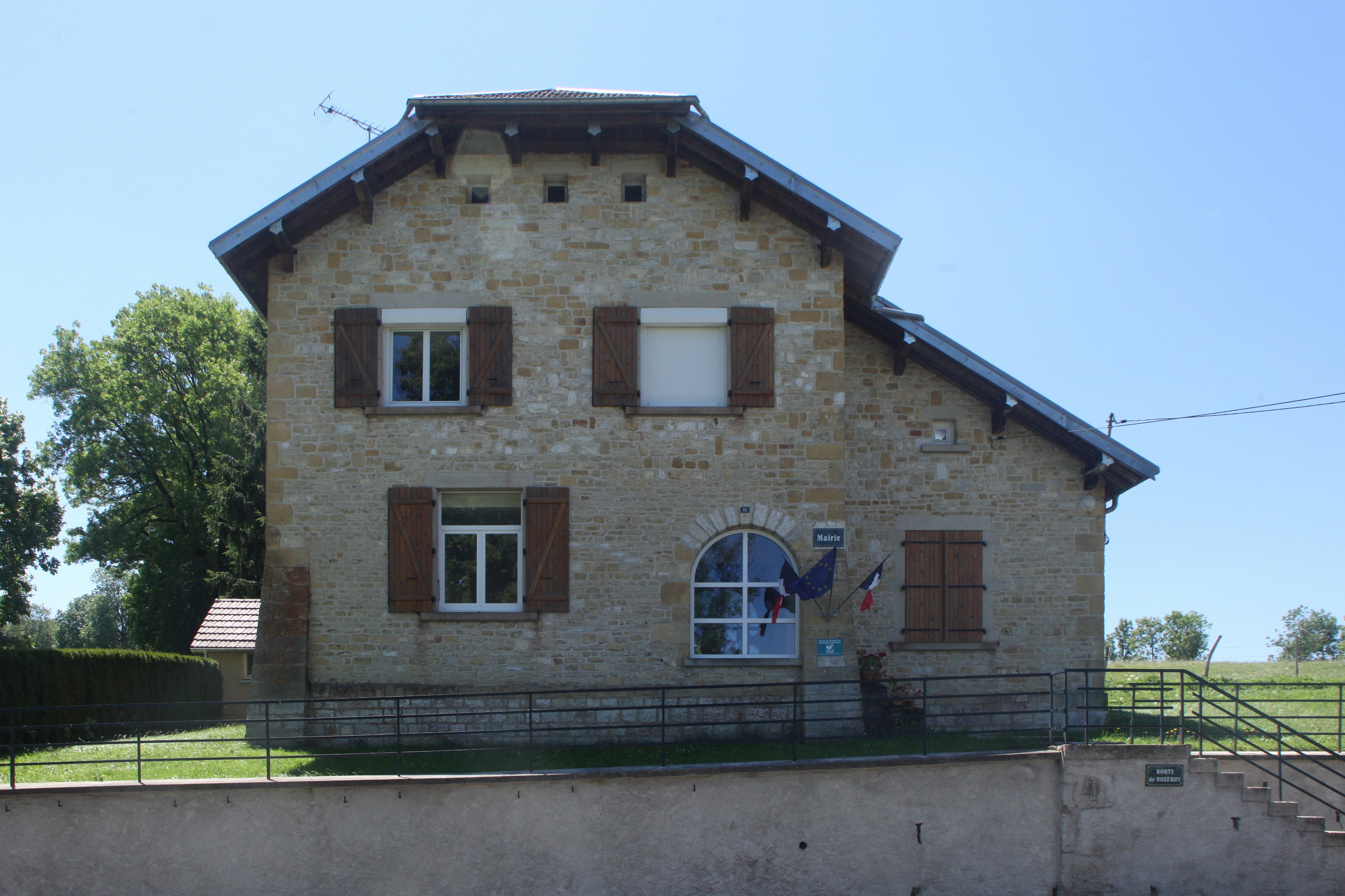
- The town hall in Rix
- Location of Rix
- Location within France Location within Bourgogne-Franche-Comté
- Coordinates: 46°46′00″N 6°03′11″E
- Country: France
- Region: Bourgogne-Franche-Comté
- Department: Jura
- Arrondissement: Lons-le-Saunier
- Canton: Saint-Laurent-en-Grandvaux

Government
  - Mayor (2020–2026): Pierre Triboulet
- Area^{1}: 5.17 km^{2} (2.00 sq mi)
- Elevation: 775 m (2,543 ft)
- Highest elevation: 923 m (3,028 ft)
- Lowest elevation: 721 m (2,365 ft)
- Population (2023): 76
  - Density: 15/km^{2} (38/sq mi)
- Time zone: UTC+01:00 (CET)
  - Summer (DST): UTC+02:00 (CEST)
- INSEE/Postal code: 39461 /39250
- ^{1} French Land Register data, which excludes lakes, ponds, glaciers > 1 km^{2} (0.386 sq mi or 247 acres) and river estuaries.

Rix, often called Rix-Trébief, is a commune in the Jura department in the region of Bourgogne-Franche-Comté in eastern France.

== Geography ==
Rix-Trébief is located 11 kilometres east of Champagnole.

It is composed of the villages of Rix and Trébief, as well as the farm of Le Barbillon.

== Population ==
Historical population
Year	Pop.	±% p.a.
1968	88	—
1975	72	−2.83%
1982	79	+1.33%
1990	84	+0.77%
1999	73	−1.55%
2007	67	−1.07%
2012	84	+4.63%
2017	78	−1.47%
2023	76	−0.43%
Source: INSEE

== See also ==
- Communes of the Jura department
