= Bonlieu =

Commune in Bourgogne-Franche-Comté, France

- Commune
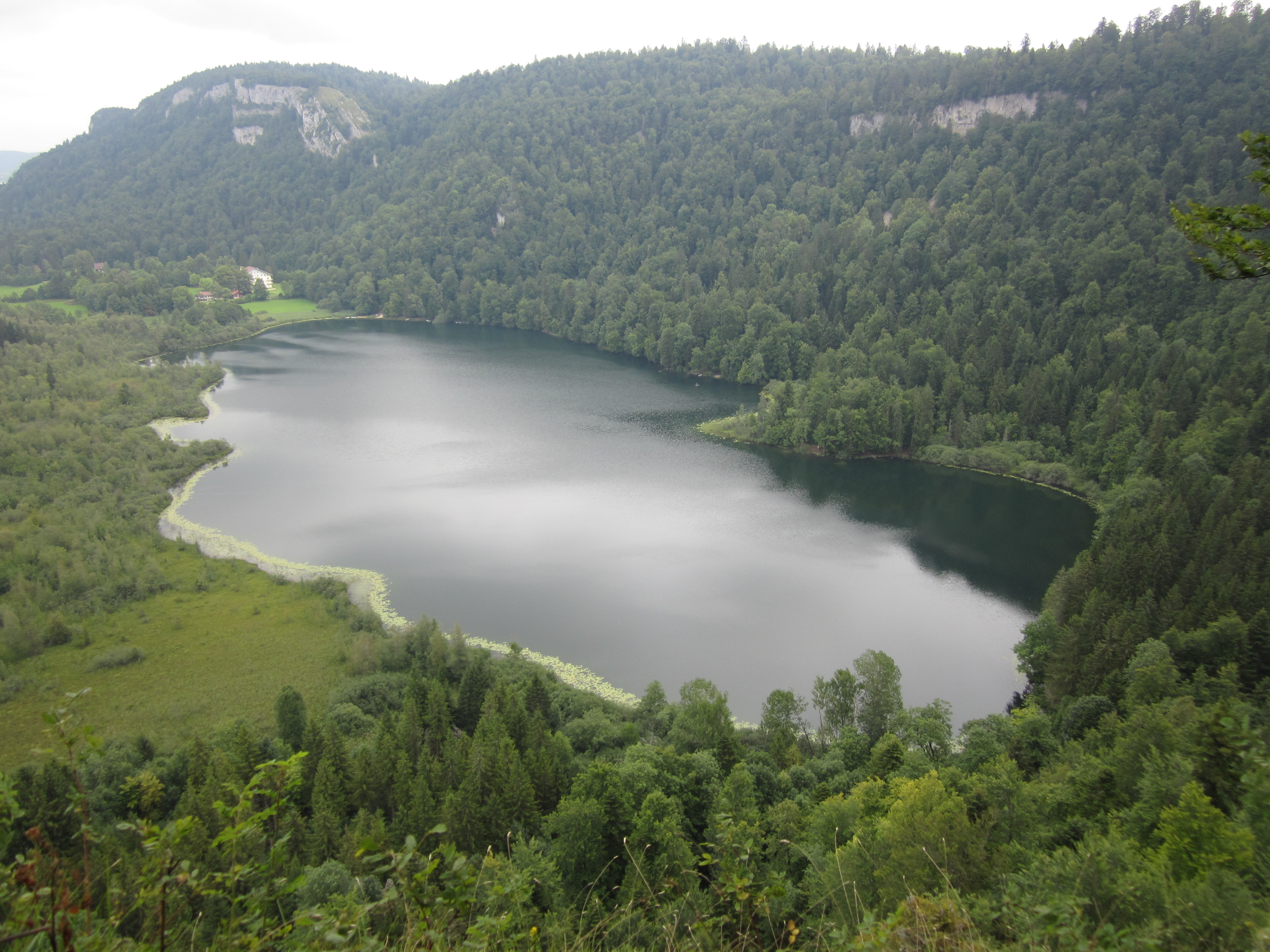
- Lac de Bonlieu
- Location of Bonlieu
- Location within France Location within Bourgogne-Franche-Comté
- Coordinates: 46°36′06″N 5°51′15″E
- Country: France
- Region: Bourgogne-Franche-Comté
- Department: Jura
- Arrondissement: Lons-le-Saunier
- Canton: Saint-Laurent-en-Grandvaux

Government
  - Mayor (2020–2026): Hervé Revol
- Area^{1}: 13.05 km^{2} (5.04 sq mi)
- Highest elevation: 1,023 m (3,356 ft)
- Lowest elevation: 620 m (2,030 ft)
- Population (2023): 223
  - Density: 17.1/km^{2} (44.3/sq mi)
- Time zone: UTC+01:00 (CET)
  - Summer (DST): UTC+02:00 (CEST)
- INSEE/Postal code: 39063 /39130
- ^{1} French Land Register data, which excludes lakes, ponds, glaciers > 1 km^{2} (0.386 sq mi or 247 acres) and river estuaries.

Bonlieu (French pronunciation: [bɔ̃ljø]) is a commune in the Jura department in Bourgogne-Franche-Comté in eastern France.

== Population ==
Historical population
Year	Pop.	±% p.a.
1968	195	—
1975	170	−1.94%
1982	158	−1.04%
1990	206	+3.37%
1999	225	+0.99%
2007	241	+0.86%
2012	273	+2.52%
2017	261	−0.89%
2023	223	−2.59%
Source: INSEE

== See also ==
- Communes of the Jura department
