= Longcochon =

Commune in Bourgogne-Franche-Comté, France

- Commune
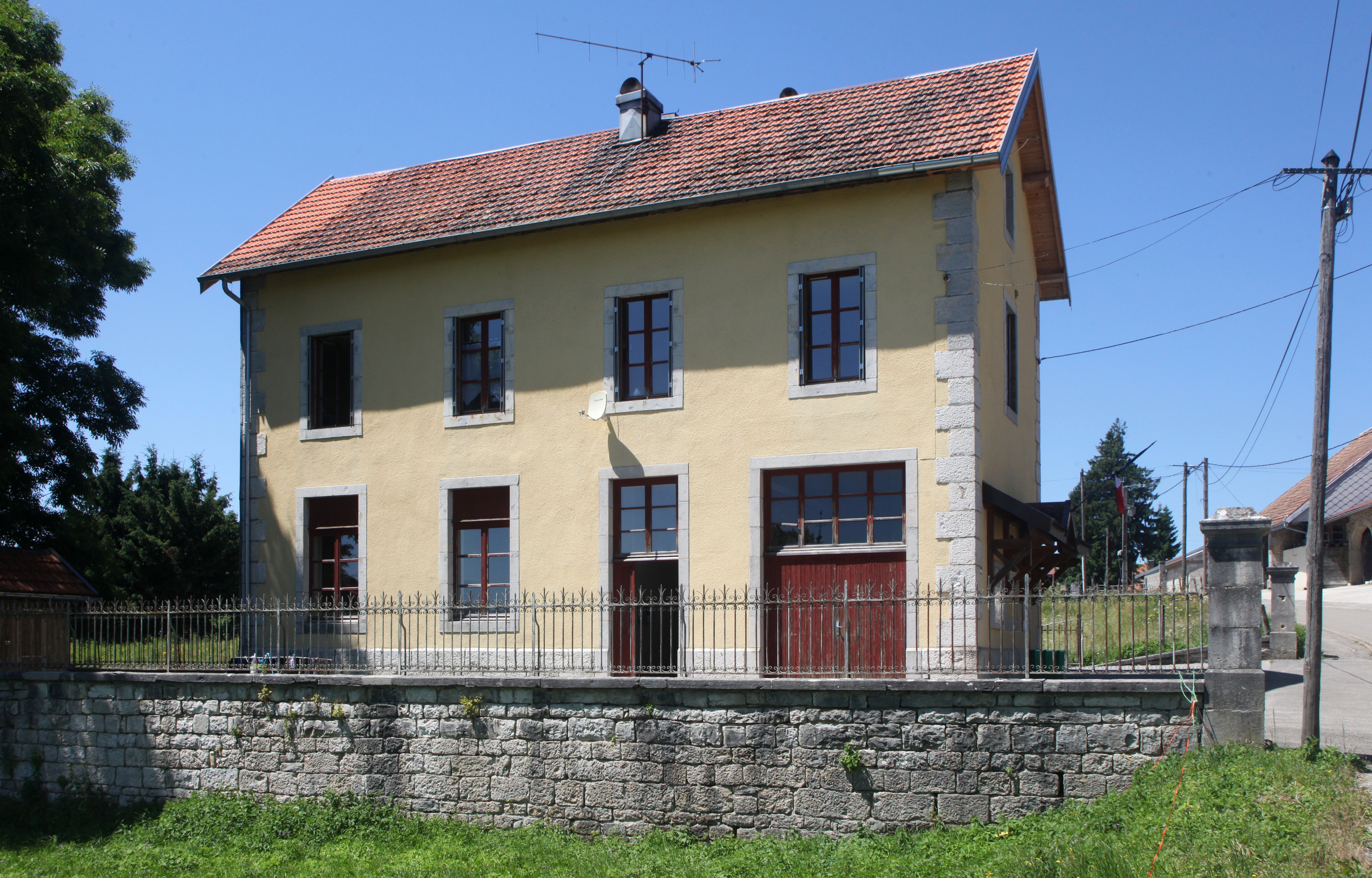
- The town hall in Longcochon
- Location of Longcochon
- Location within France Location within Bourgogne-Franche-Comté
- Coordinates: 46°46′30″N 6°04′14″E
- Country: France
- Region: Bourgogne-Franche-Comté
- Department: Jura
- Arrondissement: Lons-le-Saunier
- Canton: Saint-Laurent-en-Grandvaux

Government
  - Mayor (2020–2026): Thierry David
- Area^{1}: 3.64 km^{2} (1.41 sq mi)
- Highest elevation: 886 m (2,907 ft)
- Lowest elevation: 758 m (2,487 ft)
- Population (2023): 59
  - Density: 16/km^{2} (42/sq mi)
- Time zone: UTC+01:00 (CET)
  - Summer (DST): UTC+02:00 (CEST)
- INSEE/Postal code: 39298 /39250
- ^{1} French Land Register data, which excludes lakes, ponds, glaciers > 1 km^{2} (0.386 sq mi or 247 acres) and river estuaries.

Longcochon (French pronunciation: [lɔ̃kɔʃɔ̃]) is a commune in the Jura department in Bourgogne-Franche-Comté in eastern France.

== Population ==
Historical population
Year	Pop.	±% p.a.
1968	54	—
1975	42	−3.53%
1982	40	−0.69%
1990	49	+2.57%
1999	51	+0.45%
2007	37	−3.93%
2012	49	+5.78%
2017	63	+5.15%
2023	59	−1.09%
Source: INSEE

== See also ==
- Communes of the Jura department
