= La Chassagne =

Commune in Bourgogne-Franche-Comté, France

- Commune
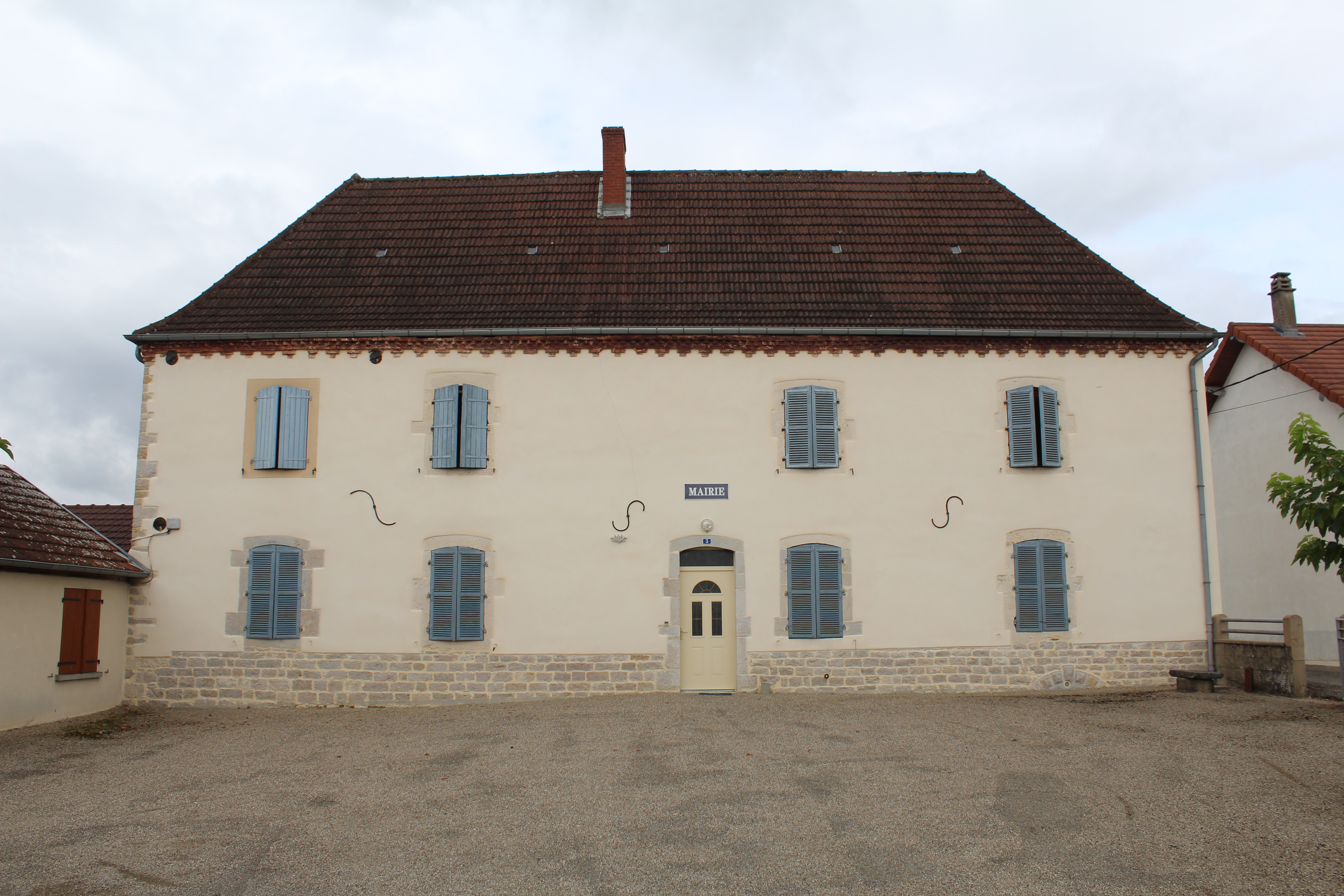
- The town hall in La Chassagne
- Location of La Chassagne
- Location within France Location within Bourgogne-Franche-Comté
- Coordinates: 46°51′52″N 5°27′10″E
- Country: France
- Region: Bourgogne-Franche-Comté
- Department: Jura
- Arrondissement: Lons-le-Saunier
- Canton: Bletterans

Government
  - Mayor (2020–2026): Jean-Louis Trossat
- Area^{1}: 5.67 km^{2} (2.19 sq mi)
- Highest elevation: 218 m (715 ft)
- Lowest elevation: 193 m (633 ft)
- Population (2023): 110
  - Density: 19/km^{2} (50/sq mi)
- Time zone: UTC+01:00 (CET)
  - Summer (DST): UTC+02:00 (CEST)
- INSEE/Postal code: 39112 /39230
- ^{1} French Land Register data, which excludes lakes, ponds, glaciers > 1 km^{2} (0.386 sq mi or 247 acres) and river estuaries.

La Chassagne (French pronunciation: [la ʃasaɲ]) is a commune in the Jura department in Bourgogne-Franche-Comté in eastern France.

== Population ==
Historical population
Year	Pop.	±% p.a.
1968	140	—
1975	104	−4.16%
1982	90	−2.04%
1990	85	−0.71%
1999	92	+0.88%
2007	118	+3.16%
2012	120	+0.34%
2017	119	−0.17%
2023	110	−1.30%
Source: INSEE

== See also ==
- Communes of the Jura department
