= Censeau =

Commune in Bourgogne-Franche-Comté, France

- Commune
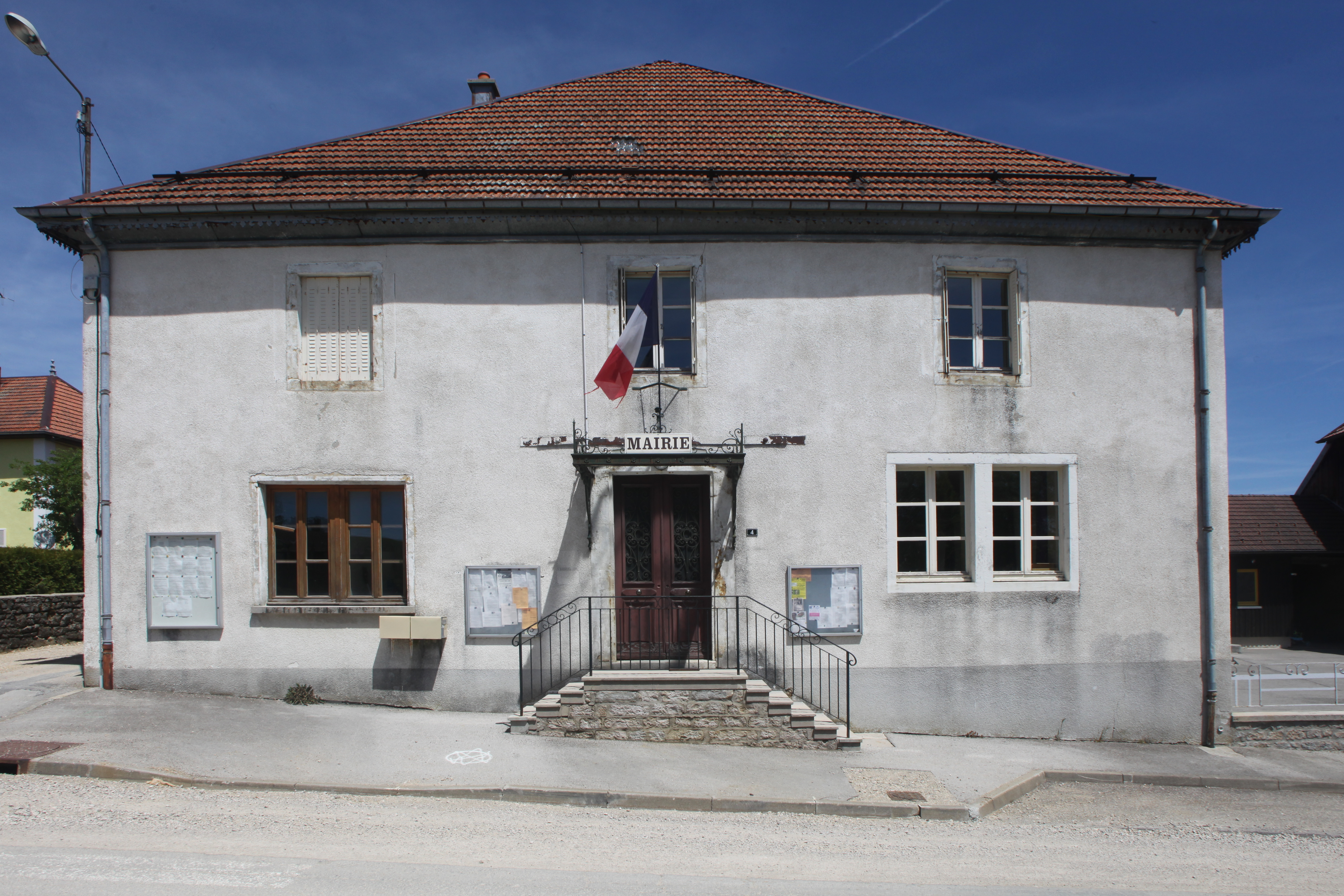
- The town hall in Censeau
- Location of Censeau
- Location within France Location within Bourgogne-Franche-Comté
- Coordinates: 46°48′52″N 6°04′07″E
- Country: France
- Region: Bourgogne-Franche-Comté
- Department: Jura
- Arrondissement: Lons-le-Saunier
- Canton: Saint-Laurent-en-Grandvaux

Government
  - Mayor (2020–2026): Jean-Marc Gresset-Bourgeois
- Area^{1}: 9.86 km^{2} (3.81 sq mi)
- Highest elevation: 882 m (2,894 ft)
- Lowest elevation: 770 m (2,530 ft)
- Population (2023): 333
  - Density: 33.8/km^{2} (87.5/sq mi)
- Time zone: UTC+01:00 (CET)
  - Summer (DST): UTC+02:00 (CEST)
- INSEE/Postal code: 39083 /39250
- ^{1} French Land Register data, which excludes lakes, ponds, glaciers > 1 km^{2} (0.386 sq mi or 247 acres) and river estuaries.

Censeau (French pronunciation: [sɑ̃so]) is a commune in the Jura department in Bourgogne-Franche-Comté in eastern France.

== Population ==
Historical population
Year	Pop.	±% p.a.
1968	305	—
1975	274	−1.52%
1982	270	−0.21%
1990	282	+0.55%
1999	292	+0.39%
2007	301	+0.38%
2012	307	+0.40%
2017	301	−0.39%
2023	333	+1.70%
Source: INSEE

== See also ==
- Communes of the Jura department
