= Relans =

Commune in Bourgogne-Franche-Comté, France

- Commune
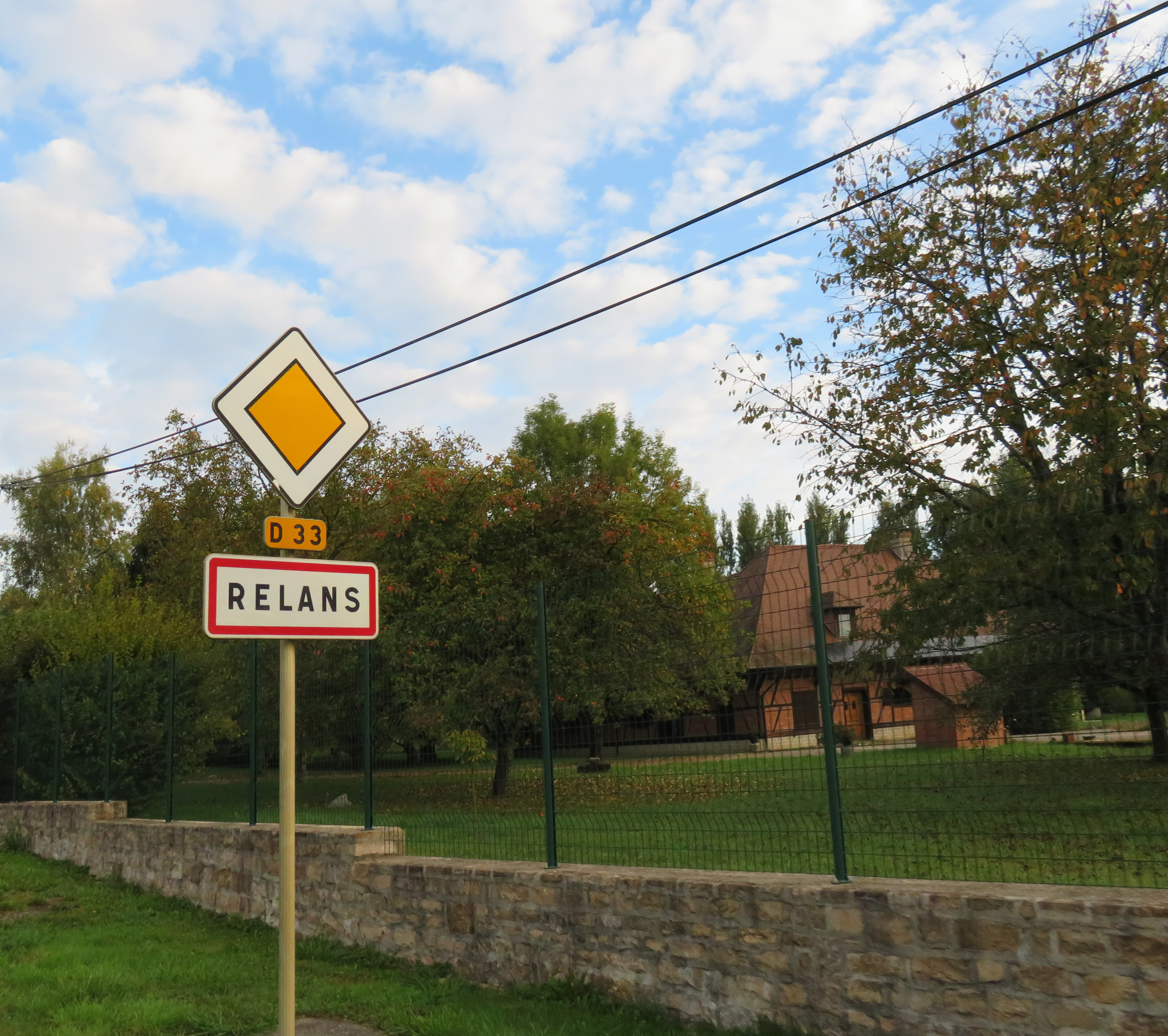
- The road into Relans
- Location of Relans
- Location within France Location within Bourgogne-Franche-Comté
- Coordinates: 46°45′48″N 5°26′51″E
- Country: France
- Region: Bourgogne-Franche-Comté
- Department: Jura
- Arrondissement: Lons-le-Saunier
- Canton: Bletterans

Government
  - Mayor (2020–2026): Robert Bailly
- Area^{1}: 4.74 km^{2} (1.83 sq mi)
- Highest elevation: 222 m (728 ft)
- Lowest elevation: 199 m (653 ft)
- Population (2023): 348
  - Density: 73.4/km^{2} (190/sq mi)
- Time zone: UTC+01:00 (CET)
  - Summer (DST): UTC+02:00 (CEST)
- INSEE/Postal code: 39456 /39140
- ^{1} French Land Register data, which excludes lakes, ponds, glaciers > 1 km^{2} (0.386 sq mi or 247 acres) and river estuaries.

Relans (French pronunciation: [ʁəlɑ̃]) is a commune in the Jura department in the region of Bourgogne-Franche-Comté in eastern France.

== Population ==
Historical population
Year	Pop.	±% p.a.
1968	148	—
1975	167	+1.74%
1982	171	+0.34%
1990	225	+3.49%
1999	248	+1.09%
2007	313	+2.95%
2012	346	+2.02%
2017	341	−0.29%
2023	348	+0.34%
Source: INSEE

== See also ==
- Communes of the Jura department
