= Bourcia =

- Part of Val Suran
- Location of Bourcia
- Location within France Location within Bourgogne-Franche-Comté
- Coordinates: 46°21′16″N 5°24′32″E
- Country: France
- Region: Bourgogne-Franche-Comté
- Department: Jura
- Arrondissement: Lons-le-Saunier
- Canton: Saint-Amour
- Commune: Val Suran
- Area^{1}: 11.13 km^{2} (4.30 sq mi)
- Highest elevation: 770 m (2,530 ft)
- Lowest elevation: 348 m (1,142 ft)
- Population (2019): 106
  - Density: 9.52/km^{2} (24.7/sq mi)
- Time zone: UTC+01:00 (CET)
  - Summer (DST): UTC+02:00 (CEST)
- Postal code: 39320
- ^{1} French Land Register data, which excludes lakes, ponds, glaciers > 1 km^{2} (0.386 sq mi or 247 acres) and river estuaries.

Bourcia (French pronunciation: [buʁsja]) is a former commune in the Jura department in Bourgogne-Franche-Comté in eastern France. On 1 January 2017, it was merged into the new commune Val Suran.

== See also ==
- Communes of the Jura department
