= Dessia =

- Part of Montlainsia
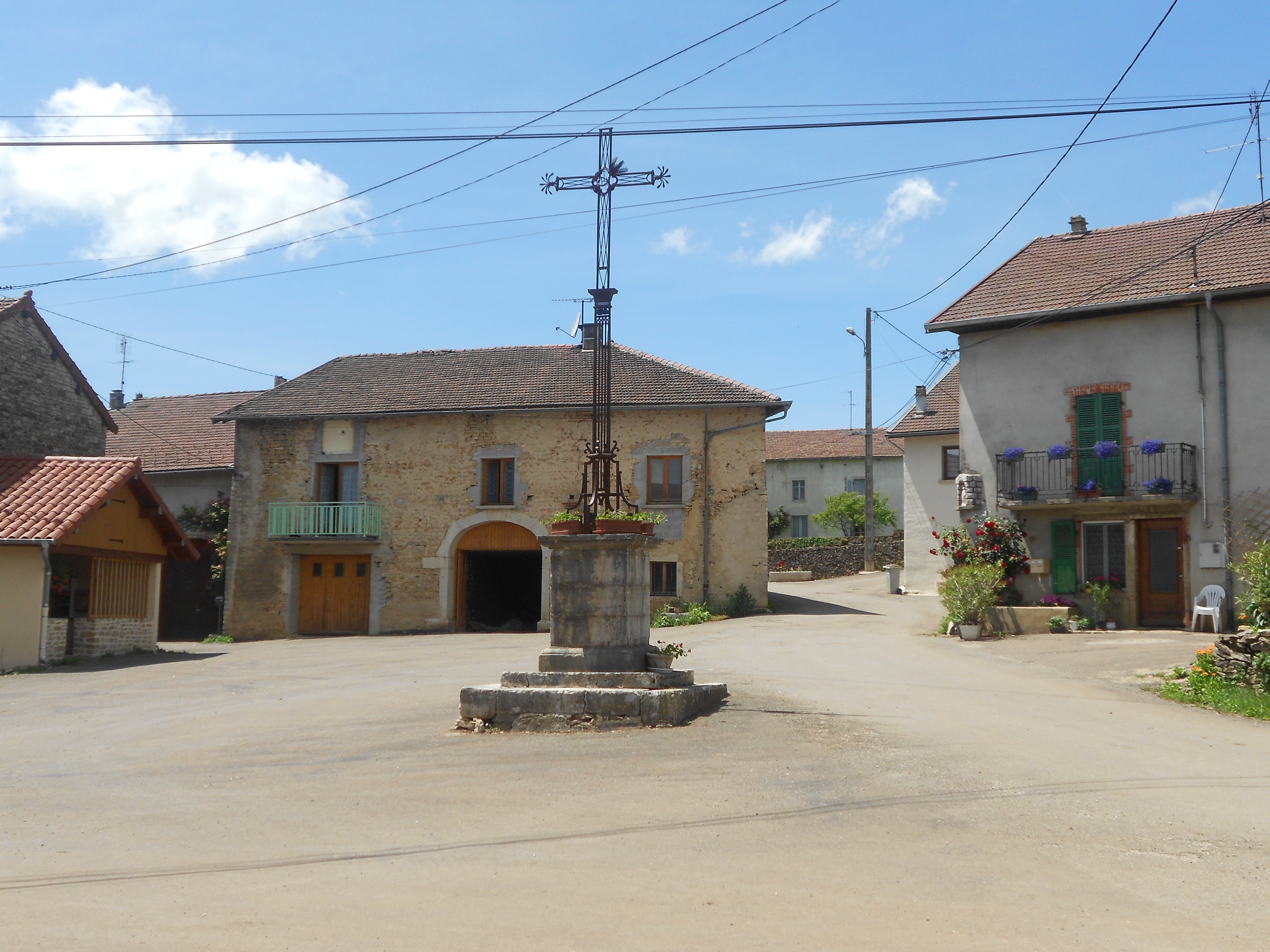
- Location of Dessia
- Location within France Location within Bourgogne-Franche-Comté
- Coordinates: 46°23′09″N 5°30′08″E
- Country: France
- Region: Bourgogne-Franche-Comté
- Department: Jura
- Arrondissement: Lons-le-Saunier
- Canton: Saint-Amour
- Commune: Montlainsia
- Area^{1}: 4.64 km^{2} (1.79 sq mi)
- Highest elevation: 671 m (2,201 ft)
- Lowest elevation: 510 m (1,670 ft)
- Population (2023): 63
  - Density: 14/km^{2} (35/sq mi)
- Time zone: UTC+01:00 (CET)
  - Summer (DST): UTC+02:00 (CEST)
- Postal code: 39320
- ^{1} French Land Register data, which excludes lakes, ponds, glaciers > 1 km^{2} (0.386 sq mi or 247 acres) and river estuaries.

Dessia (French pronunciation: [desja]) is a former commune in the Jura department in Bourgogne-Franche-Comté in eastern France. On 1 January 2017, it was merged into the new commune Montlainsia.

== See also ==
- Communes of the Jura department
