= Digna =

Digna can refer to:

- Osman Digna
- Digna Ochoa
- Digna, Jura, a French commune in the Jura department
- Digna, Tibet

Saint Digna can refer to:

- Roman martyr (see Digna and Emerita)
- One of the Martyrs of Córdoba (9th century).
- In Latin, digna means "worthy".
