= Orbagna =

Commune in Jura, France

- Part of Beaufort-Orbagna
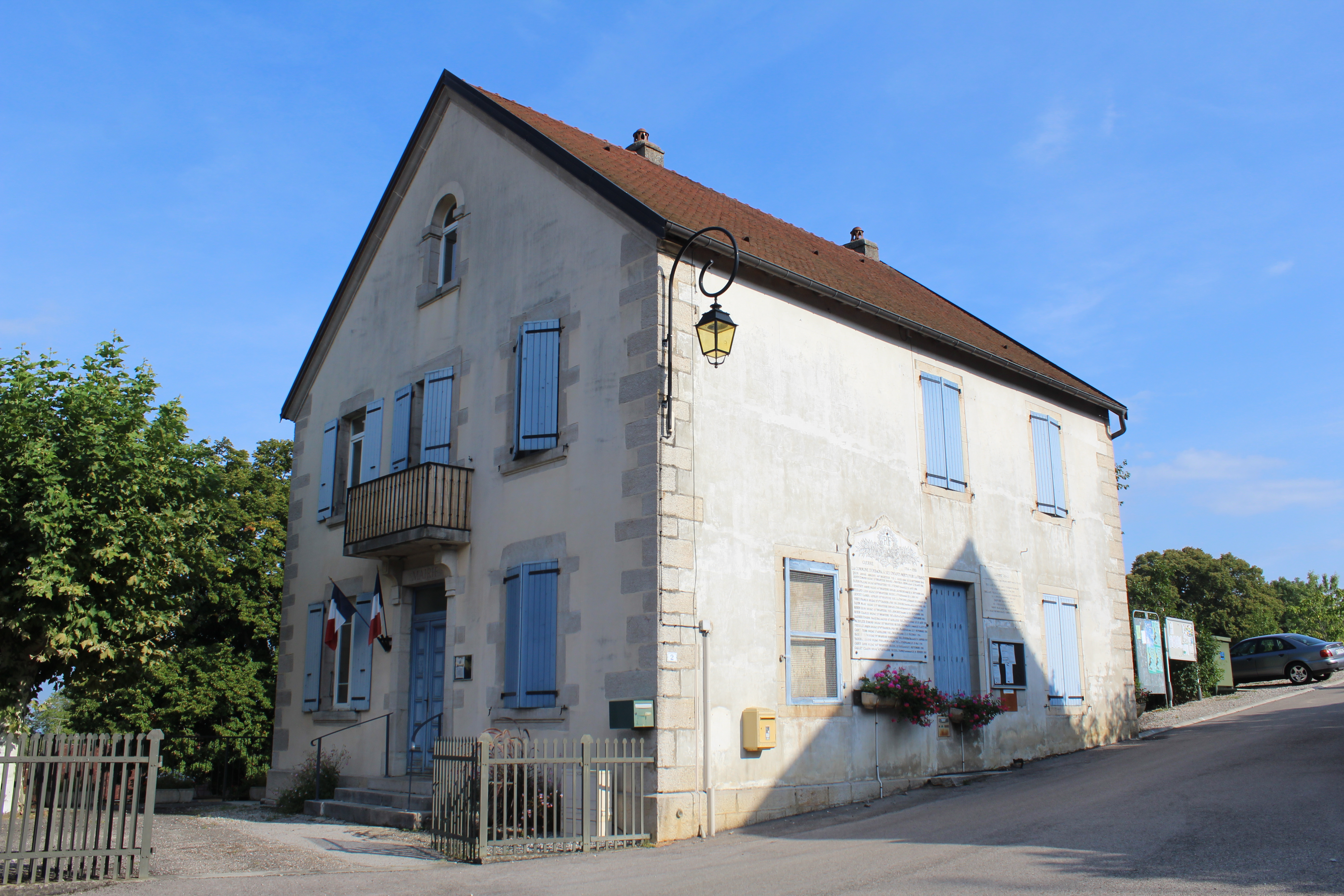
- Orbagna Town hall
- Location of Orbagna
- Location within France Location within Bourgogne-Franche-Comté
- Coordinates: 46°34′56″N 5°27′06″E
- Country: France
- Region: Bourgogne-Franche-Comté
- Department: Jura
- Arrondissement: Lons-le-Saunier
- Canton: Saint-Amour
- Commune: Beaufort-Orbagna
- Area^{1}: 4.11 km^{2} (1.59 sq mi)
- Highest elevation: 572 m (1,877 ft)
- Lowest elevation: 199 m (653 ft)
- Population (2019): 244
  - Density: 59.4/km^{2} (154/sq mi)
- Time zone: UTC+01:00 (CET)
  - Summer (DST): UTC+02:00 (CEST)
- Postal code: 39190
- ^{1} French Land Register data, which excludes lakes, ponds, glaciers > 1 km^{2} (0.386 sq mi or 247 acres) and river estuaries.

Orbagna (French pronunciation: [ɔʁbaɲa]) is a former commune in the Jura department in Bourgogne-Franche-Comté in eastern France. On 1 January 2019, it was merged into the new commune Beaufort-Orbagna.

== See also ==
- Communes of the Jura department
