= Veria (disambiguation) =

Veria may refer to:

- Veria, a town in northern Greece, also known as Veroia and (in classical antiquity) Beroea
- Veria, Laconia, a village in the municipality Oinountas, Laconia, Greece
- Véria, Jura, a commune in eastern France
- Beroea, the ancient Greek name for Aleppo, Syria
- Veria Living, a former name for the television network Z Living
