= Morval =

Morval may refer to:

- Morval, Cornwall, England
- Morval, Jura, in the commune of Andelot-Morval, France
- Morval, Pas-de-Calais, France
