= Lains =

Commune in Jura, France

- Part of Montlainsia
- Location of Lains
- Location within France Location within Bourgogne-Franche-Comté
- Coordinates: 46°23′29″N 5°29′16″E
- Country: France
- Region: Bourgogne-Franche-Comté
- Department: Jura
- Arrondissement: Lons-le-Saunier
- Canton: Saint-Amour
- Commune: Montlainsia
- Area^{1}: 9.81 km^{2} (3.79 sq mi)
- Highest elevation: 660 m (2,170 ft)
- Lowest elevation: 365 m (1,198 ft)
- Population (2023): 62
  - Density: 6.3/km^{2} (16/sq mi)
- Time zone: UTC+01:00 (CET)
  - Summer (DST): UTC+02:00 (CEST)
- Postal code: 39320
- ^{1} French Land Register data, which excludes lakes, ponds, glaciers > 1 km^{2} (0.386 sq mi or 247 acres) and river estuaries.

Lains (French pronunciation: [lɛ̃]) is a former commune in the Jura department in Bourgogne-Franche-Comté in eastern France. On 1 January 2017, it was merged into the new commune Montlainsia.

== See also ==
- Communes of the Jura department
