= Montagna-le-Templier =

- Part of Montlainsia
- Location of Montagna-le-Templier
- Location within France Location within Bourgogne-Franche-Comté
- Coordinates: 46°21′16″N 5°27′20″E
- Country: France
- Region: Bourgogne-Franche-Comté
- Department: Jura
- Arrondissement: Lons-le-Saunier
- Canton: Saint-Amour
- Commune: Montlainsia
- Area^{1}: 7.05 km^{2} (2.72 sq mi)
- Highest elevation: 571 m (1,873 ft)
- Lowest elevation: 340 m (1,120 ft)
- Population (2022): 85
  - Density: 12/km^{2} (31/sq mi)
- Time zone: UTC+01:00 (CET)
  - Summer (DST): UTC+02:00 (CEST)
- Postal code: 39320
- ^{1} French Land Register data, which excludes lakes, ponds, glaciers > 1 km^{2} (0.386 sq mi or 247 acres) and river estuaries.

Montagna-le-Templier (French pronunciation: [mɔ̃taɲa lə tɑ̃plije]) is a former commune in the Jura department in Bourgogne-Franche-Comté in eastern France. On 1 January 2017, it was merged into the new commune Montlainsia.

== See also ==
- Communes of the Jura department
