= Beaufort, Jura =

Beaufort
- Part of Beaufort-Orbagna
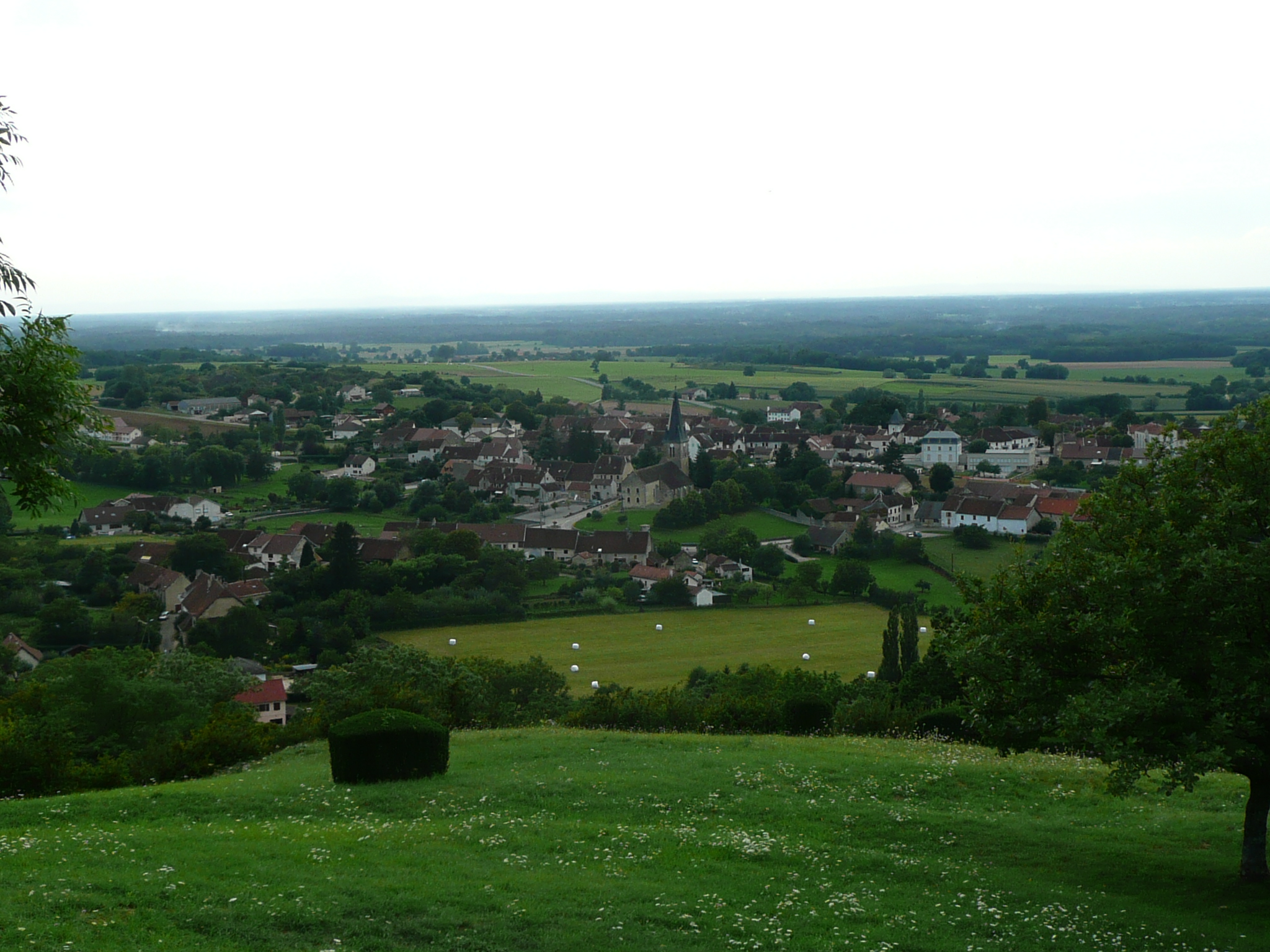

- Coat of arms
- Location of Beaufort
- Location within France Location within Bourgogne-Franche-Comté
- Coordinates: 46°34′27″N 5°26′22″E
- Country: France
- Region: Bourgogne-Franche-Comté
- Department: Jura
- Arrondissement: Lons-le-Saunier
- Canton: Saint-Amour
- Commune: Beaufort-Orbagna
- Area^{1}: 13.11 km^{2} (5.06 sq mi)
- Highest elevation: 574 m (1,883 ft)
- Lowest elevation: 191 m (627 ft)
- Population (2019): 1,154
  - Density: 88.02/km^{2} (228.0/sq mi)
- Time zone: UTC+01:00 (CET)
  - Summer (DST): UTC+02:00 (CEST)
- Postal code: 39190
- ^{1} French Land Register data, which excludes lakes, ponds, glaciers > 1 km^{2} (0.386 sq mi or 247 acres) and river estuaries.

Beaufort (French pronunciation: [bofɔʁ]) is a former commune in the Jura department in the region of Bourgogne-Franche-Comté in eastern France. On 1 January 2019, it was merged into the new commune Beaufort-Orbagna.

== Population ==
Historical population

Year	Pop.	±% p.a.
1831	1,178	—
1846	1,215	+0.21%
1872	1,359	+0.43%
1901	1,164	−0.53%
1926	1,022	−0.52%
1946	804	−1.19%
1962	841	+0.28%

Year	Pop.	±% p.a.
1968	781	−1.23%
1975	779	−0.04%
1982	896	+2.02%
1990	936	+0.55%
1999	965	+0.34%
2006	1,011	+0.67%
2019	1,154	+1.02%

Source: EHESS and INSEE

== See also ==
- Communes of the Jura department
