= Saint-Julien, Jura =

Saint-Julien
- Part of Val Suran
- Coat of arms
- Location of Saint-Julien
- Location within France Location within Bourgogne-Franche-Comté
- Coordinates: 46°23′43″N 5°27′14″E
- Country: France
- Region: Bourgogne-Franche-Comté
- Department: Jura
- Arrondissement: Lons-le-Saunier
- Canton: Saint-Amour
- Commune: Val Suran
- Area^{1}: 12.28 km^{2} (4.74 sq mi)
- Highest elevation: 591 m (1,939 ft)
- Lowest elevation: 346 m (1,135 ft)
- Population (2019): 431
  - Density: 35.1/km^{2} (90.9/sq mi)
- Time zone: UTC+01:00 (CET)
  - Summer (DST): UTC+02:00 (CEST)
- Postal code: 39320
- ^{1} French Land Register data, which excludes lakes, ponds, glaciers > 1 km^{2} (0.386 sq mi or 247 acres) and river estuaries.

Saint-Julien (French pronunciation: [sɛ̃ ʒyljɛ̃]) is a former commune in the Jura department in the Bourgogne-Franche-Comté region in eastern France. On 1 January 2017, it was merged into the new commune Val Suran.

== Population ==
Historical population

Year	Pop.	±% p.a.
1793	808	—
1821	765	−0.20%
1846	767	+0.01%
1872	725	−0.22%
1901	717	−0.04%
1926	514	−1.32%
1946	441	−0.76%
1962	474	+0.45%

Year	Pop.	±% p.a.
1968	420	−2.00%
1975	415	−0.17%
1982	459	+1.45%
1990	464	+0.14%
1999	409	−1.39%
2006	439	+1.02%
2019	431	−0.14%

Source: EHESS and INSEE

== See also ==
- Communes of the Jura department
