= Rosay =

Rosay may refer to the following communes in France:

- Rosay, Jura, in the Jura département
- Rosay, Seine-Maritime, in the Seine-Maritime département
- Rosay, Yvelines, in the Yvelines département
- Rosay-sur-Lieure, in the Eure département
- Rosay, the nickname of Rose Dougall of the British band The Pipettes
- Rosay, the nickname of Miami native rapper Rick Ross.

== See also ==
- Rosé
