= Villechantria =

- Part of Val Suran
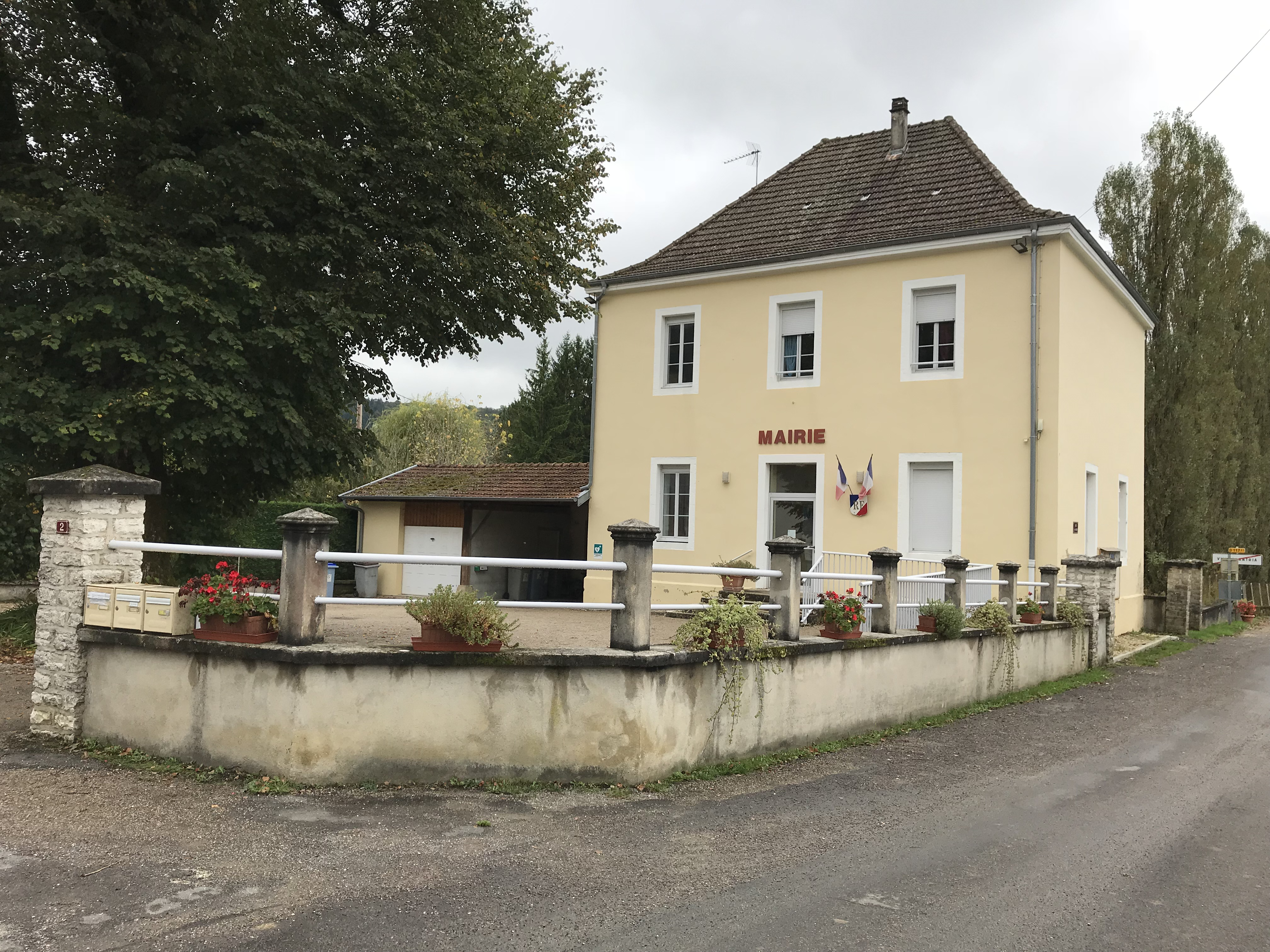
- Town hall
- Location of Villechantria
- Location within France Location within Bourgogne-Franche-Comté
- Coordinates: 46°22′28″N 5°26′25″E
- Country: France
- Region: Bourgogne-Franche-Comté
- Department: Jura
- Arrondissement: Lons-le-Saunier
- Canton: Saint-Amour
- Commune: Val Suran
- Area^{1}: 6.28 km^{2} (2.42 sq mi)
- Highest elevation: 556 m (1,824 ft)
- Lowest elevation: 336 m (1,102 ft)
- Population (2019): 119
  - Density: 18.9/km^{2} (49.1/sq mi)
- Time zone: UTC+01:00 (CET)
  - Summer (DST): UTC+02:00 (CEST)
- Postal code: 39320
- ^{1} French Land Register data, which excludes lakes, ponds, glaciers > 1 km^{2} (0.386 sq mi or 247 acres) and river estuaries.

Villechantria (French pronunciation: [vilʃɑ̃tʁija]) is a former commune in the Jura department in the Bourgogne-Franche-Comté region in eastern France. On 1 January 2017, it was merged into the new commune Val Suran.

== See also ==
- Communes of the Jura department
