= Thoissia =

- Commune
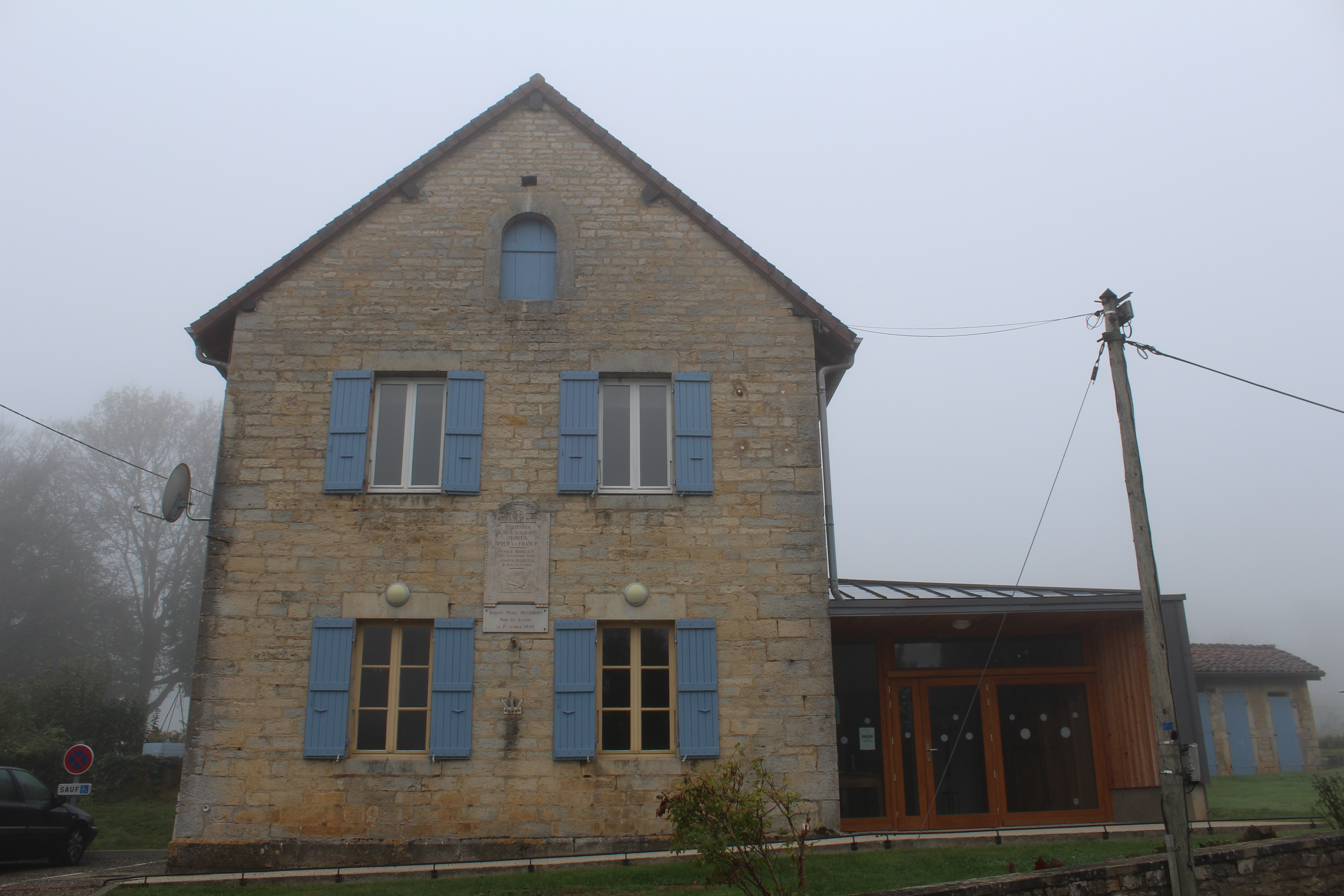
- The town hall in Thoissia
- Location of Thoissia
- Location within France Location within Bourgogne-Franche-Comté
- Coordinates: 46°25′27″N 5°23′45″E
- Country: France
- Region: Bourgogne-Franche-Comté
- Department: Jura
- Arrondissement: Lons-le-Saunier
- Canton: Saint-Amour

Government
  - Mayor (2020–2026): Claude Gandillet
- Area^{1}: 3.89 km^{2} (1.50 sq mi)
- Highest elevation: 605 m (1,985 ft)
- Lowest elevation: 427 m (1,401 ft)
- Population (2023): 34
  - Density: 8.7/km^{2} (23/sq mi)
- Time zone: UTC+01:00 (CET)
  - Summer (DST): UTC+02:00 (CEST)
- INSEE/Postal code: 39532 /39160
- ^{1} French Land Register data, which excludes lakes, ponds, glaciers > 1 km^{2} (0.386 sq mi or 247 acres) and river estuaries.

Thoissia (French pronunciation: [twasja]) is a commune in the Jura department in the Bourgogne-Franche-Comté region in eastern France.

== Population ==
Historical population
Year	Pop.	±% p.a.
1968	36	—
1975	30	−2.57%
1982	26	−2.02%
1990	27	+0.47%
1999	24	−1.30%
2007	31	+3.25%
2012	43	+6.76%
2017	36	−3.49%
2023	34	−0.95%
Source: INSEE

== See also ==
- Communes of the Jura department
