= Beaufort-Orbagna =

Commune in Bourgogne-Franche-Comté, France

- Commune
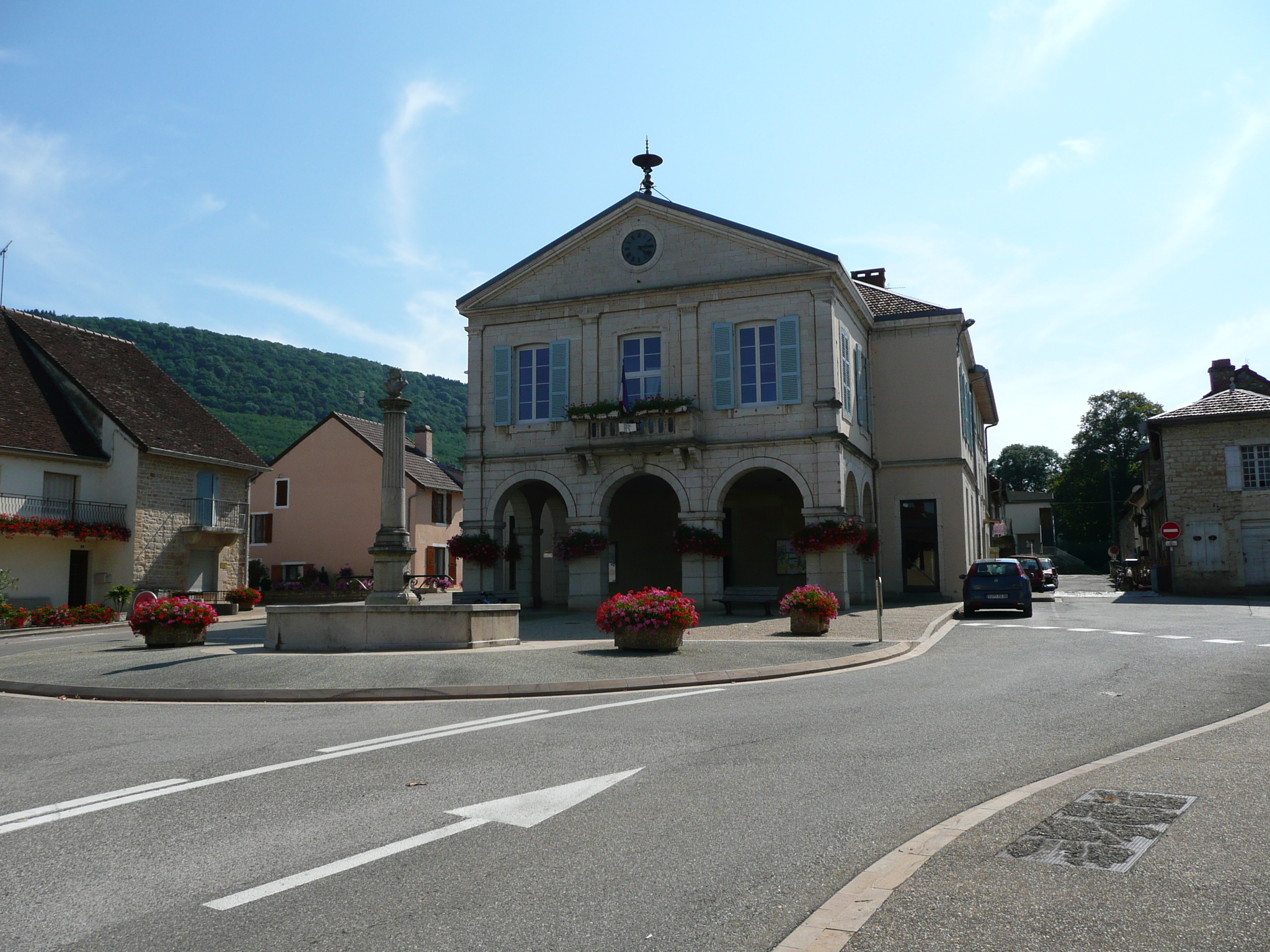
- The town hall in Beaufort
- Location of Beaufort-Orbagna
- Location within France Location within Bourgogne-Franche-Comté
- Coordinates: 46°34′27″N 5°26′22″E
- Country: France
- Region: Bourgogne-Franche-Comté
- Department: Jura
- Arrondissement: Lons-le-Saunier
- Canton: Saint-Amour
- Intercommunality: Porte du Jura

Government
  - Mayor (2020–2026): Emmanuel Klinguer
- Area^{1}: 13.11 km^{2} (5.06 sq mi)
- Highest elevation: 574 m (1,883 ft)
- Lowest elevation: 191 m (627 ft)
- Population (2023): 1,481
  - Density: 113.0/km^{2} (292.6/sq mi)
- Time zone: UTC+01:00 (CET)
  - Summer (DST): UTC+02:00 (CEST)
- INSEE/Postal code: 39043 /39190
- ^{1} French Land Register data, which excludes lakes, ponds, glaciers > 1 km^{2} (0.386 sq mi or 247 acres) and river estuaries.

Beaufort-Orbagna (French pronunciation: [bofɔʁ ɔʁbaɲa]) is a commune in the Jura department in the region of Bourgogne-Franche-Comté in eastern France. It was established on 1 January 2019 by merger of the former communes of Beaufort (the seat) and Orbagna.

== See also ==
- Communes of the Jura department
