= Cuisia =

Commune in Bourgogne-Franche-Comté, France

- Commune
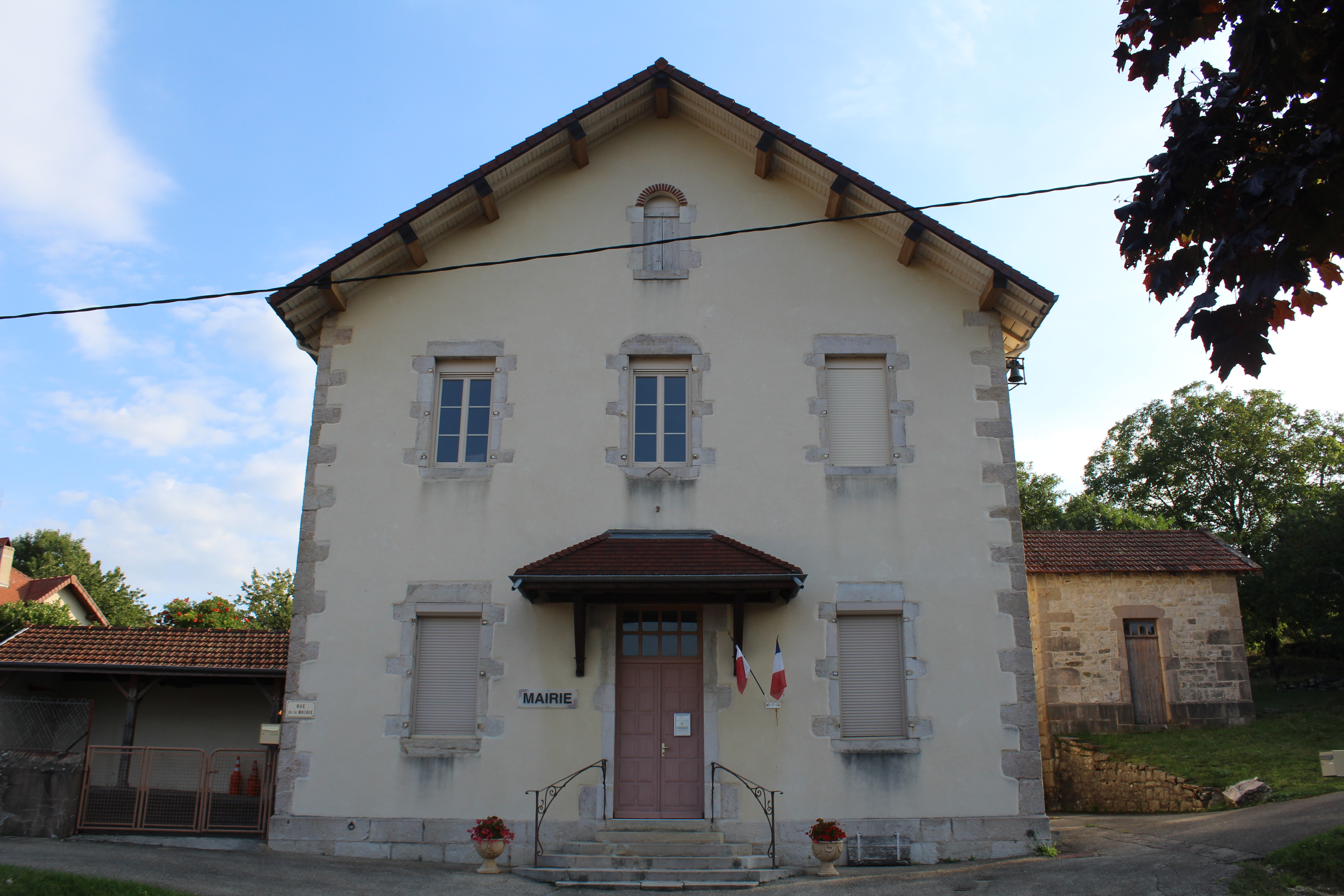
- The town hall in Cuisia
- Location of Cuisia
- Location within France Location within Bourgogne-Franche-Comté
- Coordinates: 46°32′18″N 5°24′10″E
- Country: France
- Region: Bourgogne-Franche-Comté
- Department: Jura
- Arrondissement: Lons-le-Saunier
- Canton: Saint-Amour

Government
  - Mayor (2020–2026): Renaud Poncelin
- Area^{1}: 10.16 km^{2} (3.92 sq mi)
- Highest elevation: 554 m (1,818 ft)
- Lowest elevation: 193 m (633 ft)
- Population (2023): 386
  - Density: 38.0/km^{2} (98.4/sq mi)
- Time zone: UTC+01:00 (CET)
  - Summer (DST): UTC+02:00 (CEST)
- INSEE/Postal code: 39185 /39190
- ^{1} French Land Register data, which excludes lakes, ponds, glaciers > 1 km^{2} (0.386 sq mi or 247 acres) and river estuaries.

Cuisia (French pronunciation: [kɥizja]) is a commune in the Jura department in Bourgogne-Franche-Comté in eastern France.

== Population ==
Historical population
| Year | Pop. | ±% p.a. |
|---|---|---|
| 1968 | 373 | — |
| 1975 | 378 | +0.19% |
| 1982 | 401 | +0.85% |
| 1990 | 411 | +0.31% |
| 1999 | 364 | −1.34% |
| 2007 | 400 | +1.19% |
| 2012 | 399 | −0.05% |
| 2017 | 392 | −0.35% |
| 2023 | 386 | −0.26% |
Source: INSEE

== See also ==
- Communes of the Jura department
