= Val Suran =

- Commune
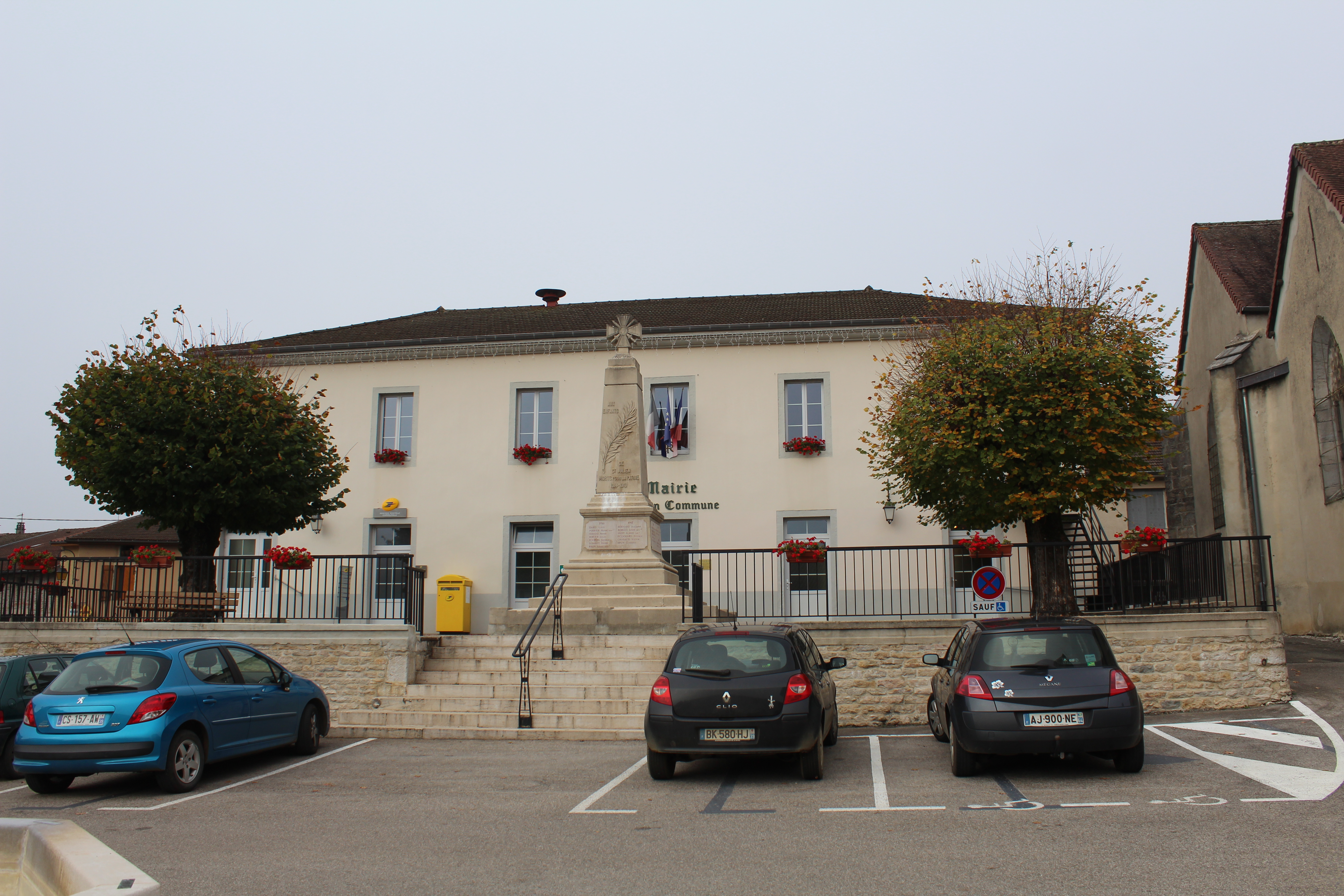
- The town hall in Val Suran
- Location of Val Suran
- Location within France Location within Bourgogne-Franche-Comté
- Coordinates: 46°23′42″N 5°27′14″E
- Country: France
- Region: Bourgogne-Franche-Comté
- Department: Jura
- Arrondissement: Lons-le-Saunier
- Canton: Saint-Amour
- Area^{1}: 37.49 km^{2} (14.47 sq mi)
- Population (2023): 777
  - Density: 20.7/km^{2} (53.7/sq mi)
- Time zone: UTC+01:00 (CET)
  - Summer (DST): UTC+02:00 (CEST)
- INSEE/Postal code: 39485 /39320
- ^{1} French Land Register data, which excludes lakes, ponds, glaciers > 1 km^{2} (0.386 sq mi or 247 acres) and river estuaries.

Val Suran is a commune in the department of Jura, eastern France. The municipality was established on 1 January 2017 by merger of the former communes of Saint-Julien (the seat), Bourcia, Louvenne and Villechantria.

== See also ==
- Communes of the Jura department
