= Montagna-le-Reconduit =

Commune in Bourgogne-Franche-Comté, France

- Commune
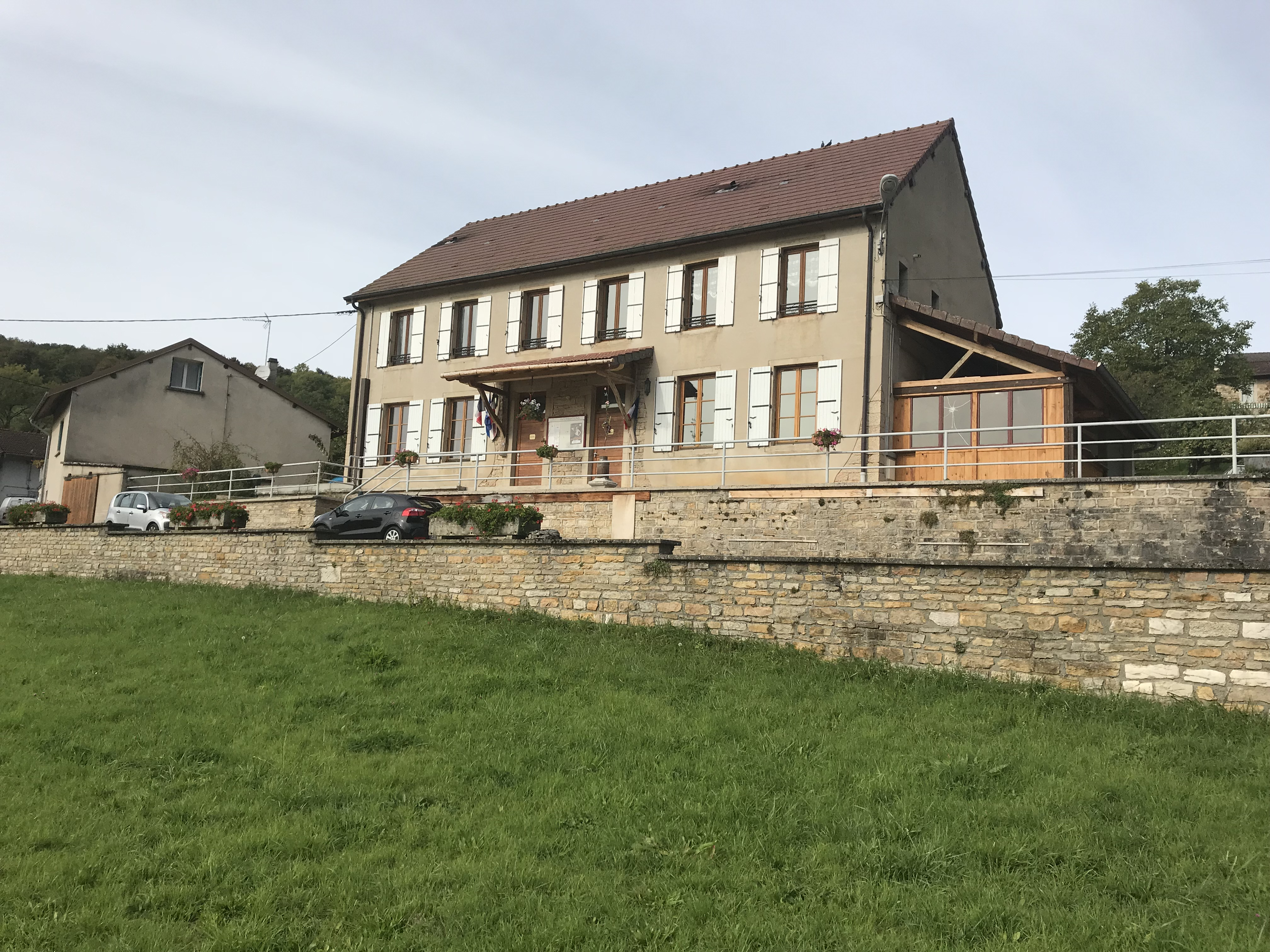
- The town hall in Montagna-le-Reconduit
- Location of Montagna-le-Reconduit
- Location within France Location within Bourgogne-Franche-Comté
- Coordinates: 46°27′33″N 5°23′11″E
- Country: France
- Region: Bourgogne-Franche-Comté
- Department: Jura
- Arrondissement: Lons-le-Saunier
- Canton: Saint-Amour

Government
  - Mayor (2020–2026): Maryvonne Yonnet
- Area^{1}: 5.43 km^{2} (2.10 sq mi)
- Highest elevation: 553 m (1,814 ft)
- Lowest elevation: 270 m (890 ft)
- Population (2023): 108
  - Density: 19.9/km^{2} (51.5/sq mi)
- Time zone: UTC+01:00 (CET)
  - Summer (DST): UTC+02:00 (CEST)
- INSEE/Postal code: 39346 /39160
- ^{1} French Land Register data, which excludes lakes, ponds, glaciers > 1 km^{2} (0.386 sq mi or 247 acres) and river estuaries.

Montagna-le-Reconduit (French pronunciation: [mɔ̃taɲa lə ʁəkɔ̃dɥi]) is a commune in the Jura department in Bourgogne-Franche-Comté in eastern France.

== See also ==
- Communes of the Jura department
