= Rotalier =

Commune in Bourgogne-Franche-Comté, France

- Commune
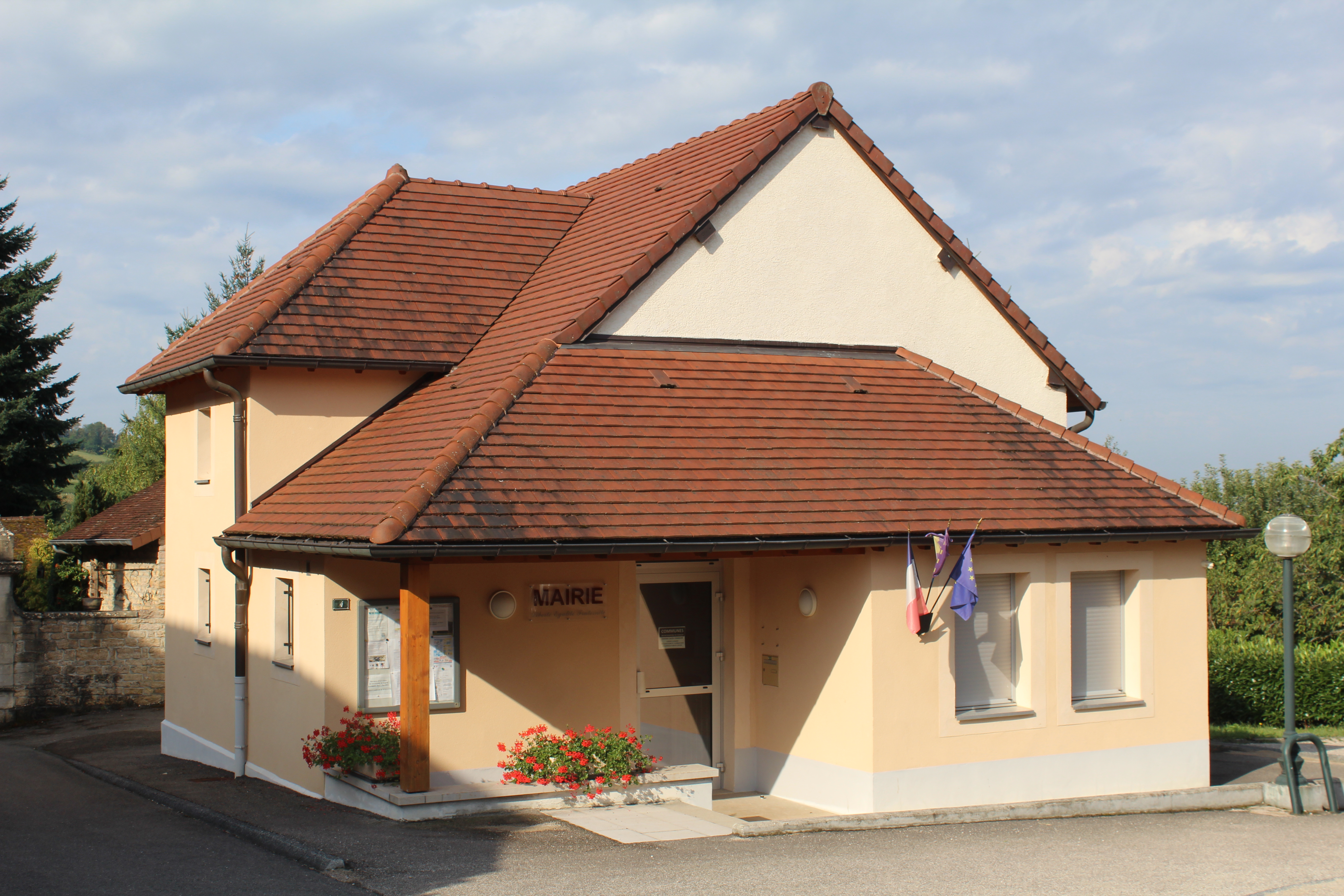
- The town hall in Rotalier
- Location of Rotalier
- Location within France Location within Bourgogne-Franche-Comté
- Coordinates: 46°35′23″N 5°28′40″E
- Country: France
- Region: Bourgogne-Franche-Comté
- Department: Jura
- Arrondissement: Lons-le-Saunier
- Canton: Saint-Amour

Government
  - Mayor (2020–2026): Jean-Pierre Boutter
- Area^{1}: 4.07 km^{2} (1.57 sq mi)
- Highest elevation: 572 m (1,877 ft)
- Lowest elevation: 224 m (735 ft)
- Population (2023): 151
  - Density: 37.1/km^{2} (96.1/sq mi)
- Time zone: UTC+01:00 (CET)
  - Summer (DST): UTC+02:00 (CEST)
- INSEE/Postal code: 39467 /39190
- ^{1} French Land Register data, which excludes lakes, ponds, glaciers > 1 km^{2} (0.386 sq mi or 247 acres) and river estuaries.

Rotalier (French pronunciation: [ʁɔtalje]) is a commune in the Jura department in the region of Bourgogne-Franche-Comté in eastern France.

== Population ==
Historical population
Year	Pop.	±% p.a.
1968	157	—
1975	167	+0.89%
1982	166	−0.09%
1990	181	+1.09%
1999	163	−1.16%
2007	170	+0.53%
2012	172	+0.23%
2017	161	−1.31%
2023	151	−1.06%
Source: INSEE

== See also ==
- Communes of the Jura department
