= Monnetay =

Commune in Bourgogne-Franche-Comté, France

- Commune
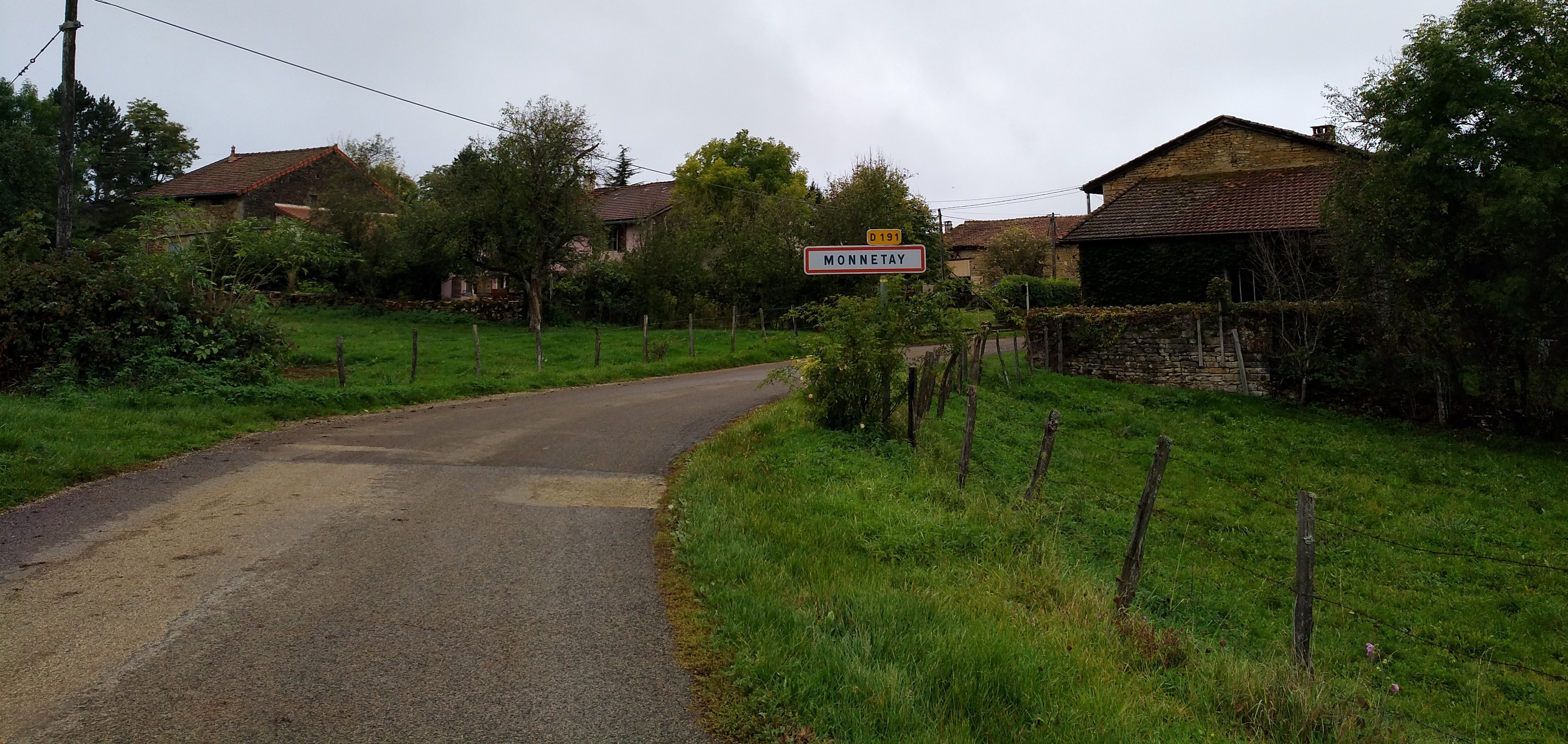
- Entrance to the village.
- Location of Monnetay
- Location within France Location within Bourgogne-Franche-Comté
- Coordinates: 46°27′10″N 5°30′49″E
- Country: France
- Region: Bourgogne-Franche-Comté
- Department: Jura
- Arrondissement: Lons-le-Saunier
- Canton: Saint-Amour
- Intercommunality: Terre d'Émeraude Communauté

Government
  - Mayor (2020–2026): Jean-Marie Paget
- Area^{1}: 2.46 km^{2} (0.95 sq mi)
- Highest elevation: 598 m (1,962 ft)
- Lowest elevation: 429 m (1,407 ft)
- Population (2023): 17
  - Density: 6.9/km^{2} (18/sq mi)
- Time zone: UTC+01:00 (CET)
  - Summer (DST): UTC+02:00 (CEST)
- INSEE/Postal code: 39343 /39320
- ^{1} French Land Register data, which excludes lakes, ponds, glaciers > 1 km^{2} (0.386 sq mi or 247 acres) and river estuaries.

Monnetay (French pronunciation: [mɔntɛ]) is a commune in the Jura department in Bourgogne-Franche-Comté in eastern France.

== Population ==
Historical population
Year	Pop.	±% p.a.
1968	25	—
1975	28	+1.63%
1982	22	−3.39%
1990	19	−1.82%
1999	16	−1.89%
2007	13	−2.56%
2012	20	+9.00%
2017	14	−6.89%
2023	17	+3.29%
Source: INSEE

== See also ==
- Communes of the Jura department
