= Graye-et-Charnay =

Commune in Bourgogne-Franche-Comté, France

- Commune
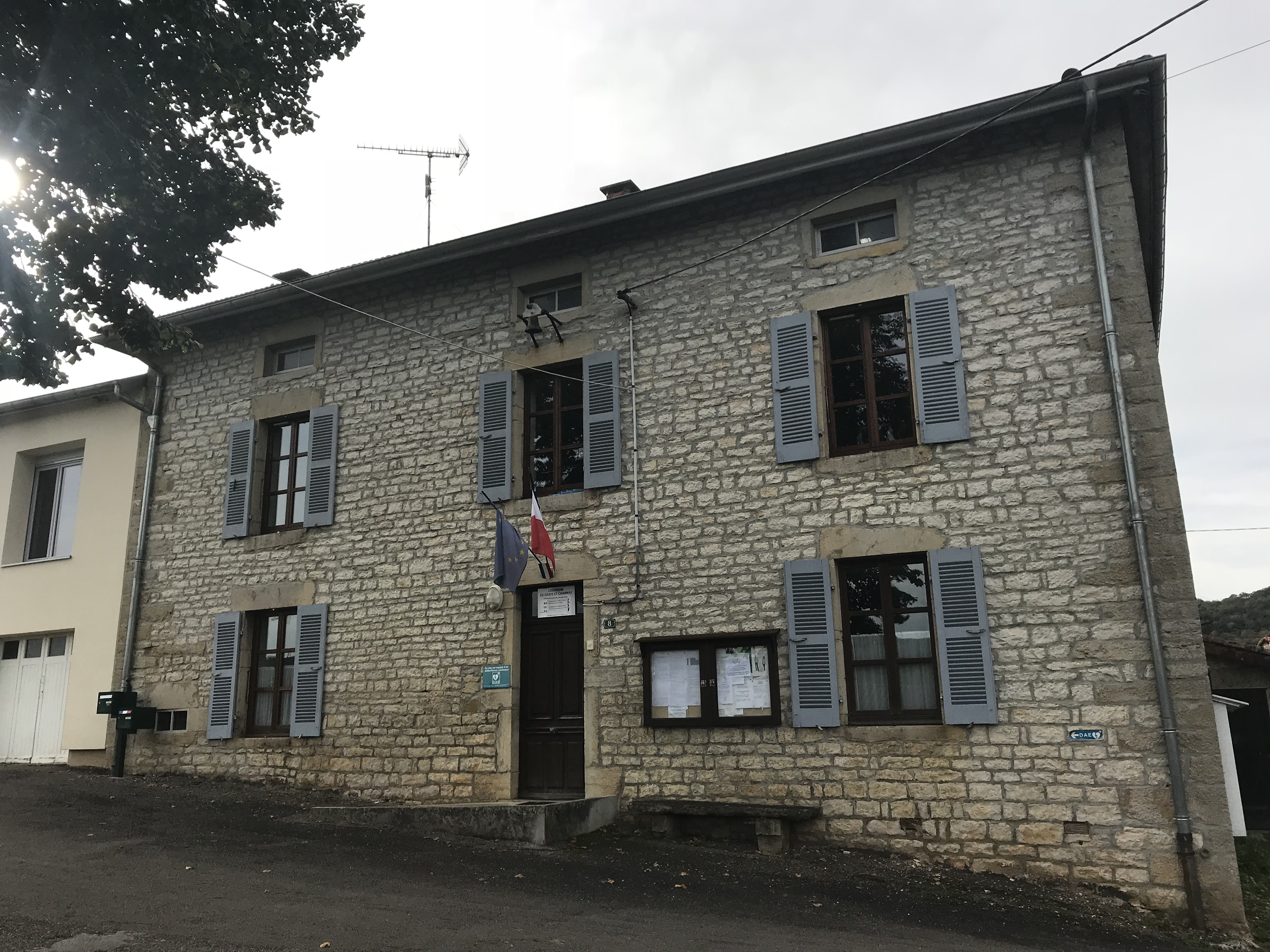
- The town hall in Graye-et-Charnay
- Location of Graye-et-Charnay
- Location within France Location within Bourgogne-Franche-Comté
- Coordinates: 46°28′08″N 5°27′11″E
- Country: France
- Region: Bourgogne-Franche-Comté
- Department: Jura
- Arrondissement: Lons-le-Saunier
- Canton: Saint-Amour

Government
  - Mayor (2020–2026): Claude Gréa
- Area^{1}: 6.31 km^{2} (2.44 sq mi)
- Highest elevation: 604 m (1,982 ft)
- Lowest elevation: 367 m (1,204 ft)
- Population (2023): 134
  - Density: 21.2/km^{2} (55.0/sq mi)
- Time zone: UTC+01:00 (CET)
  - Summer (DST): UTC+02:00 (CEST)
- INSEE/Postal code: 39261 /39320
- ^{1} French Land Register data, which excludes lakes, ponds, glaciers > 1 km^{2} (0.386 sq mi or 247 acres) and river estuaries.

Graye-et-Charnay (French pronunciation: [ɡʁɛ e ʃaʁnɛ]) is a commune in the Jura department in Bourgogne-Franche-Comté in eastern France.

== Population ==
Historical population
Year	Pop.	±% p.a.
1968	139	—
1975	130	−0.95%
1982	129	−0.11%
1990	113	−1.64%
1999	101	−1.24%
2007	135	+3.69%
2012	133	−0.30%
2017	139	+0.89%
2023	134	−0.61%
Source: INSEE

== See also ==
- Communes of the Jura department
