= Loisia =

Commune in Bourgogne-Franche-Comté, France

- Commune
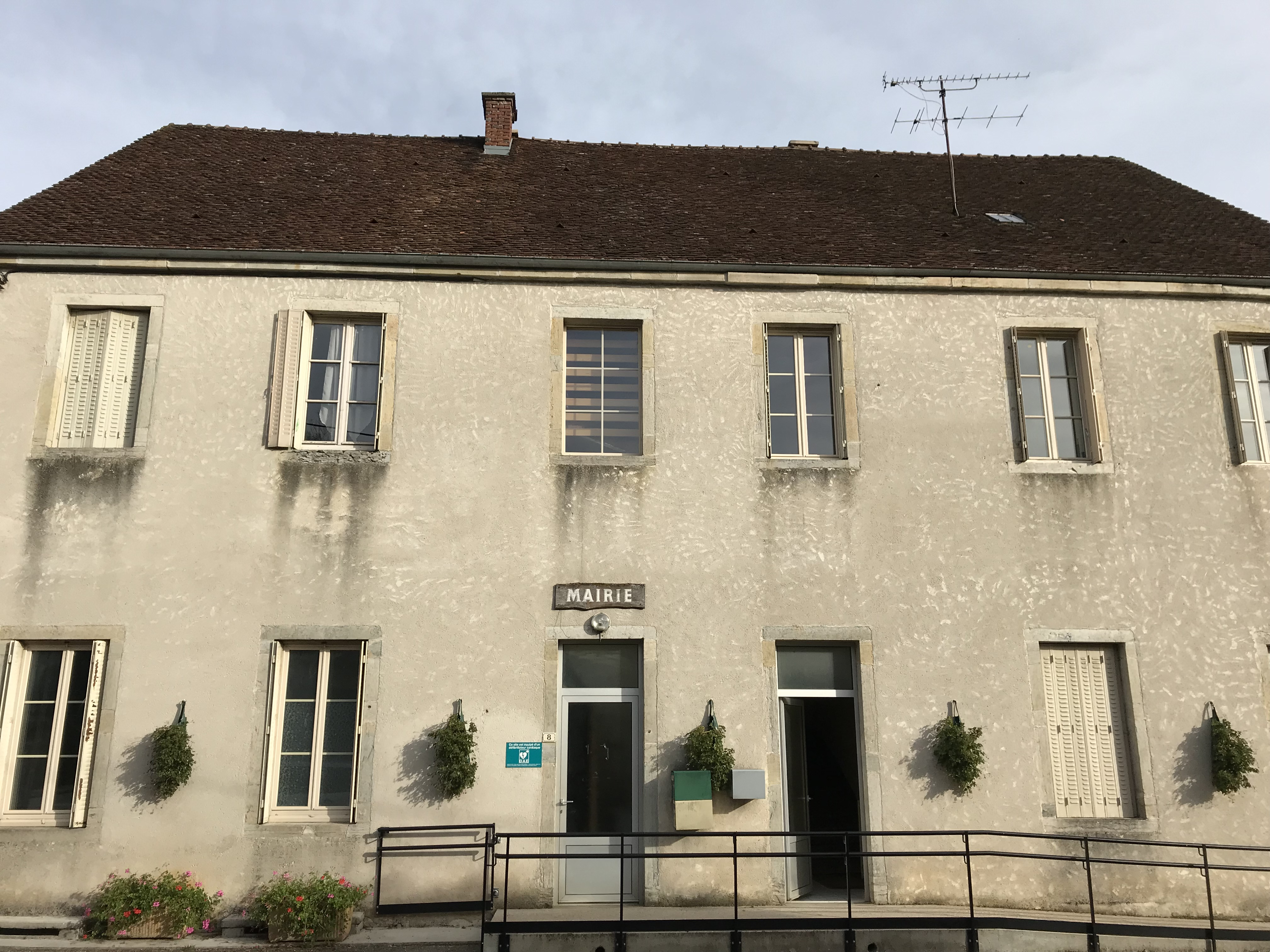
- The town hall in Loisia
- Location of Loisia
- Location within France Location within Bourgogne-Franche-Comté
- Coordinates: 46°29′09″N 5°27′48″E
- Country: France
- Region: Bourgogne-Franche-Comté
- Department: Jura
- Arrondissement: Lons-le-Saunier
- Canton: Saint-Amour

Government
  - Mayor (2020–2026): Jean-Luc Perrod
- Area^{1}: 11.58 km^{2} (4.47 sq mi)
- Highest elevation: 637 m (2,090 ft)
- Lowest elevation: 371 m (1,217 ft)
- Population (2023): 142
  - Density: 12.3/km^{2} (31.8/sq mi)
- Time zone: UTC+01:00 (CET)
  - Summer (DST): UTC+02:00 (CEST)
- INSEE/Postal code: 39295 /39320
- ^{1} French Land Register data, which excludes lakes, ponds, glaciers > 1 km^{2} (0.386 sq mi or 247 acres) and river estuaries.

Loisia (French pronunciation: [lwazja]) is a commune in the Jura department in Bourgogne-Franche-Comté in eastern France.

== Population ==
Historical population
Year	Pop.	±% p.a.
1968	183	—
1975	153	−2.53%
1982	166	+1.17%
1990	164	−0.15%
1999	157	−0.48%
2007	178	+1.58%
2012	168	−1.15%
2017	166	−0.24%
2023	142	−2.57%
Source: INSEE

== See also ==
- Communes of the Jura department
