= Balanod =

Commune in Bourgogne-Franche-Comté, France

- Commune
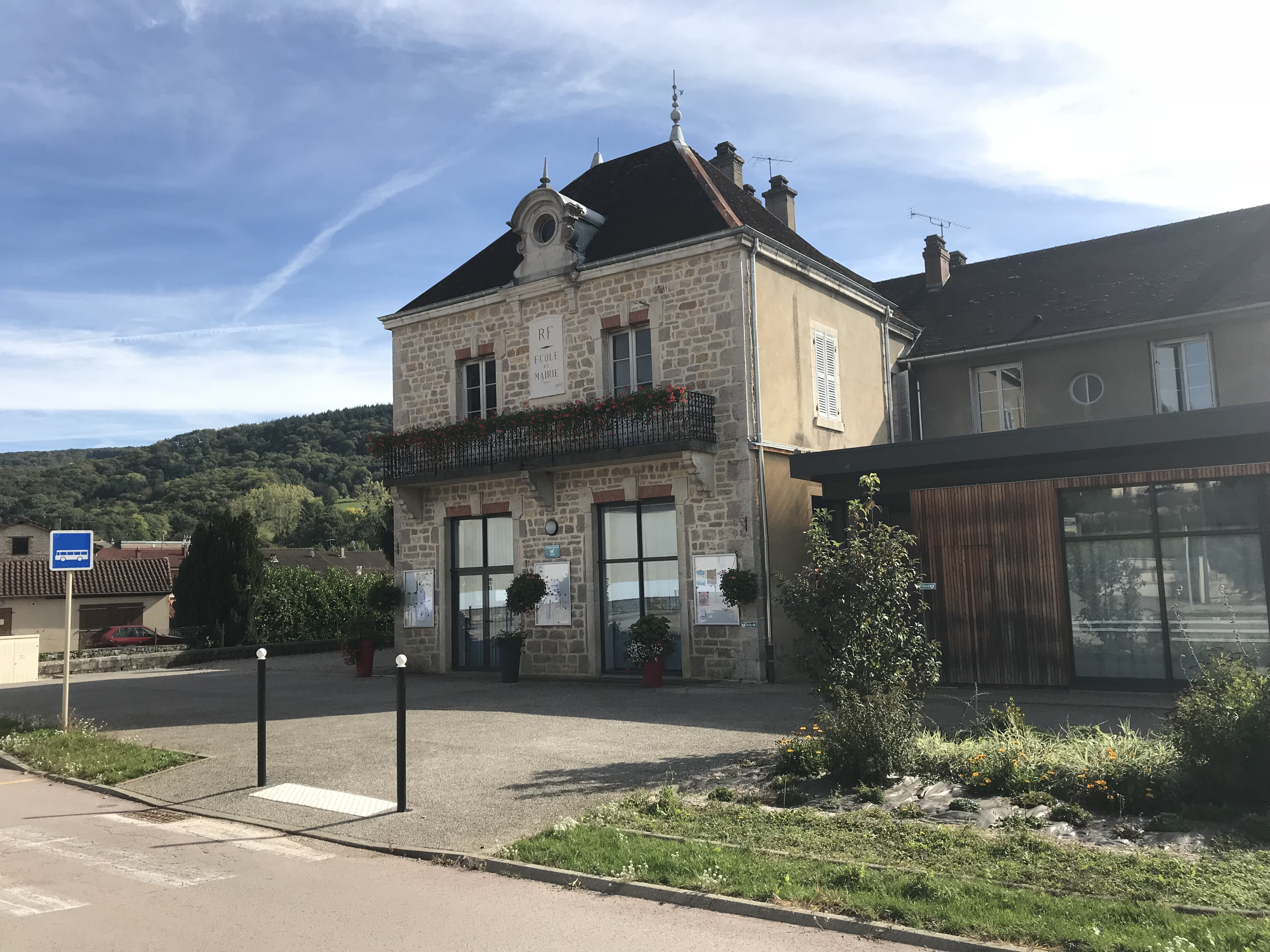
- The town hall in Balanod
- Location of Balanod
- Location within France Location within Bourgogne-Franche-Comté
- Coordinates: 46°27′25″N 5°21′23″E
- Country: France
- Region: Bourgogne-Franche-Comté
- Department: Jura
- Arrondissement: Lons-le-Saunier
- Canton: Saint-Amour

Government
  - Mayor (2020–2026): Michel Perret
- Area^{1}: 4.93 km^{2} (1.90 sq mi)
- Highest elevation: 435 m (1,427 ft)
- Lowest elevation: 207 m (679 ft)
- Population (2023): 323
  - Density: 65.5/km^{2} (170/sq mi)
- Time zone: UTC+01:00 (CET)
  - Summer (DST): UTC+02:00 (CEST)
- INSEE/Postal code: 39035 /39160
- ^{1} French Land Register data, which excludes lakes, ponds, glaciers > 1 km^{2} (0.386 sq mi or 247 acres) and river estuaries.

Balanod (French pronunciation: [balano]) is a commune in the Jura department in the region of Bourgogne-Franche-Comté in eastern France.

== Population ==
Historical population
Year	Pop.	±% p.a.
1968	327	—
1975	327	+0.00%
1982	297	−1.37%
1990	319	+0.90%
1999	293	−0.94%
2007	320	+1.11%
2012	341	+1.28%
2017	349	+0.46%
2023	323	−1.28%
Source: INSEE

== See also ==
- Communes of the Jura department
