= Cressia =

Commune in Bourgogne-Franche-Comté, France

- Commune
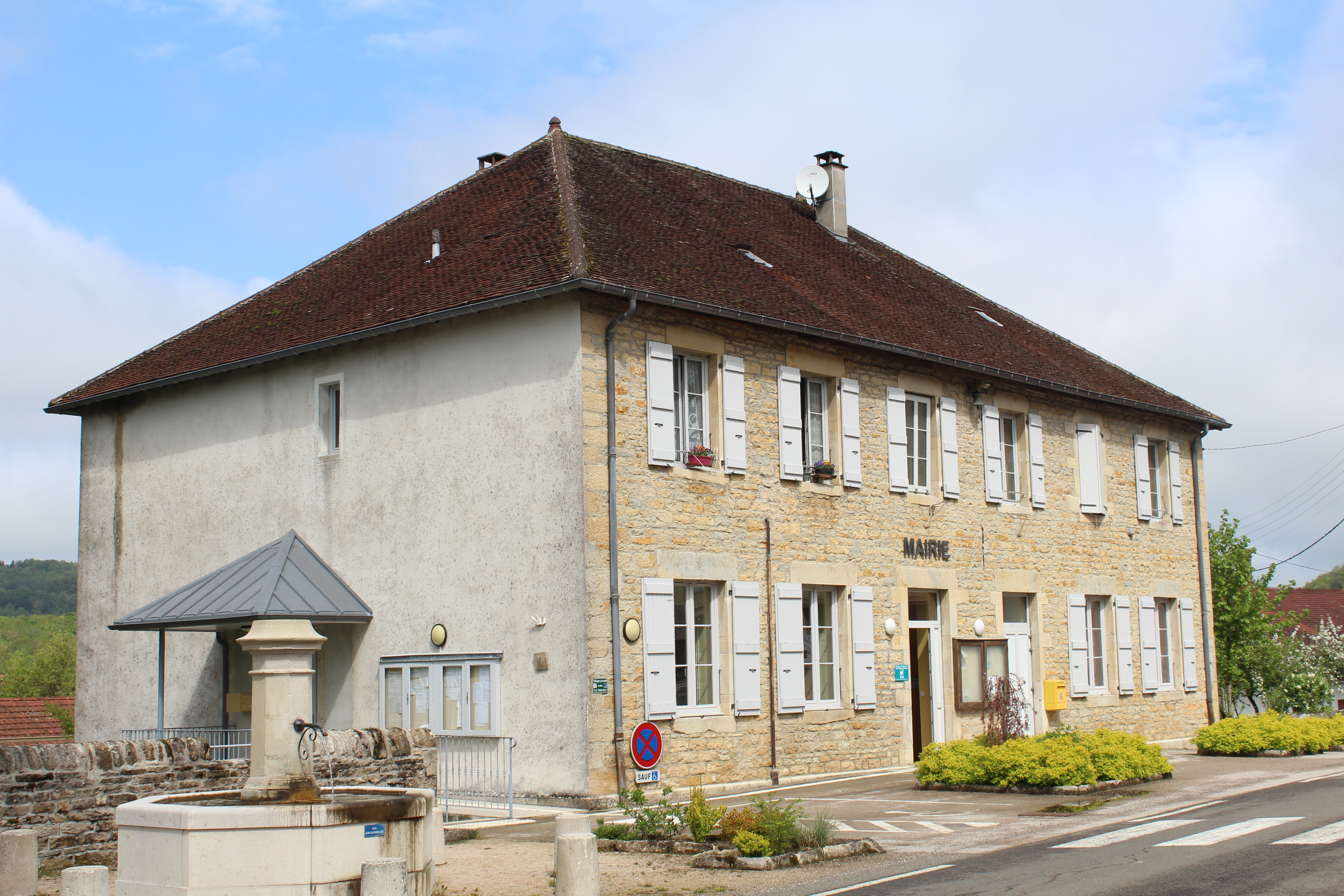
- The town hall in Cressia
- Location of Cressia
- Location within France Location within Bourgogne-Franche-Comté
- Coordinates: 46°31′46″N 5°28′51″E
- Country: France
- Region: Bourgogne-Franche-Comté
- Department: Jura
- Arrondissement: Lons-le-Saunier
- Canton: Saint-Amour

Government
  - Mayor (2020–2026): Catherine Lancelot
- Area^{1}: 14.99 km^{2} (5.79 sq mi)
- Highest elevation: 637 m (2,090 ft)
- Lowest elevation: 431 m (1,414 ft)
- Population (2023): 243
  - Density: 16.2/km^{2} (42.0/sq mi)
- Time zone: UTC+01:00 (CET)
  - Summer (DST): UTC+02:00 (CEST)
- INSEE/Postal code: 39180 /39270
- ^{1} French Land Register data, which excludes lakes, ponds, glaciers > 1 km^{2} (0.386 sq mi or 247 acres) and river estuaries.

Cressia (French pronunciation: [kʁesja]) is a commune in the Jura department in Bourgogne-Franche-Comté in eastern France.

== Population ==
Historical population
Year	Pop.	±% p.a.
1968	275	—
1975	262	−0.69%
1982	230	−1.84%
1990	259	+1.50%
1999	314	+2.16%
2007	271	−1.82%
2012	273	+0.15%
2017	258	−1.12%
2023	243	−0.99%
Source: INSEE

== See also ==
- Communes of the Jura department
