= Gizia =

Commune in Bourgogne-Franche-Comté, France

- Commune
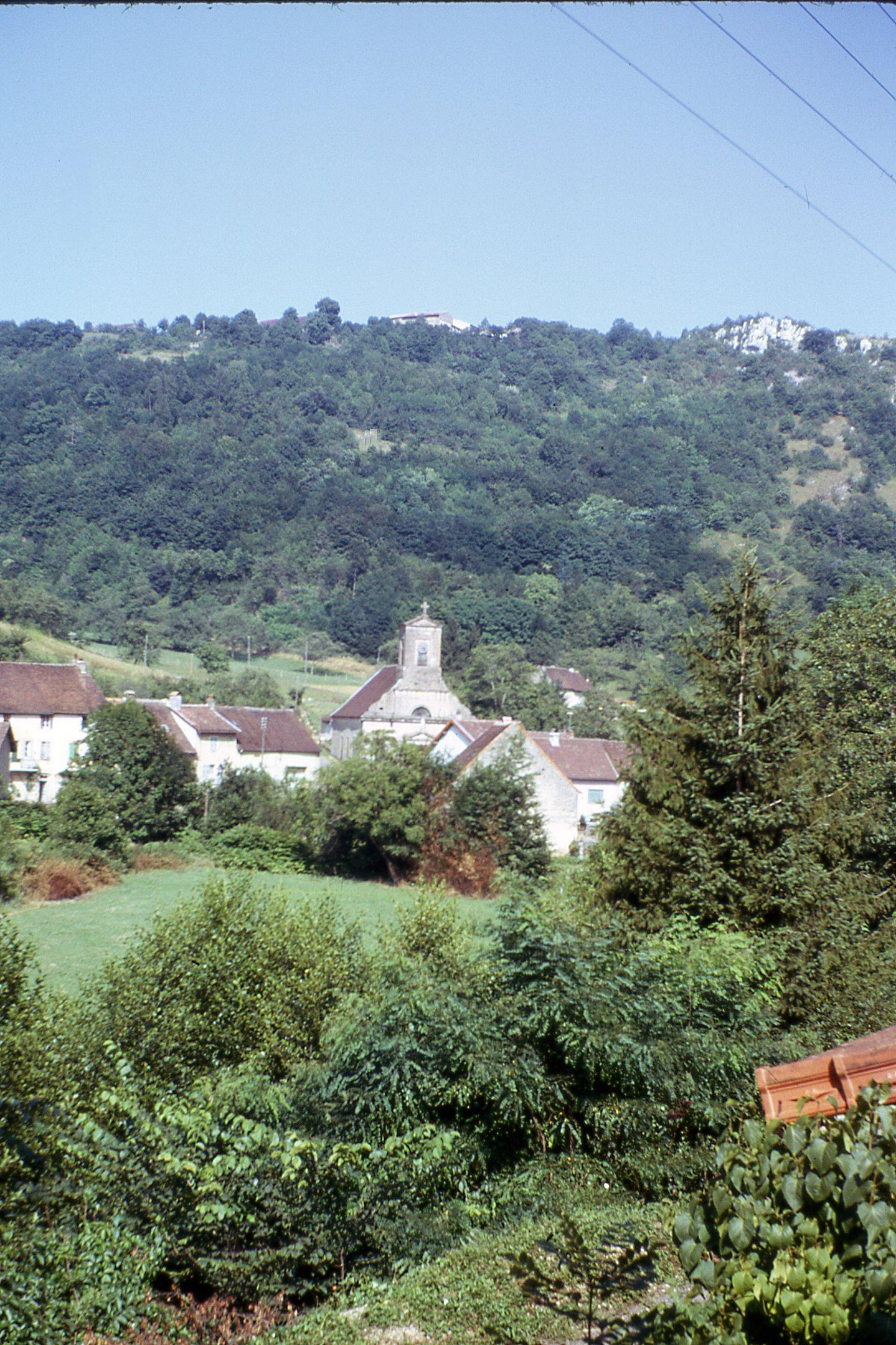
- A general view of Gizia

- Coat of arms
- Location of Gizia
- Location within France Location within Bourgogne-Franche-Comté
- Coordinates: 46°31′42″N 5°25′16″E
- Country: France
- Region: Bourgogne-Franche-Comté
- Department: Jura
- Arrondissement: Lons-le-Saunier
- Canton: Saint-Amour

Government
  - Mayor (2020–2026): Michel Nicod
- Area^{1}: 7.35 km^{2} (2.84 sq mi)
- Highest elevation: 633 m (2,077 ft)
- Lowest elevation: 220 m (720 ft)
- Population (2023): 186
  - Density: 25.3/km^{2} (65.5/sq mi)
- Time zone: UTC+01:00 (CET)
  - Summer (DST): UTC+02:00 (CEST)
- INSEE/Postal code: 39255 /39190
- ^{1} French Land Register data, which excludes lakes, ponds, glaciers > 1 km^{2} (0.386 sq mi or 247 acres) and river estuaries.

Gizia (French pronunciation: [ʒizja]) is a commune in the Jura department in Bourgogne-Franche-Comté in eastern France.

== Population ==
Historical population
Year	Pop.	±% p.a.
1968	287	—
1975	294	+0.34%
1982	274	−1.00%
1990	223	−2.54%
1999	221	−0.10%
2007	221	+0.00%
2012	202	−1.78%
2017	236	+3.16%
2023	186	−3.89%
Source: INSEE

== See also ==
- Communes of the Jura department
