= Maynal =

Commune in Bourgogne-Franche-Comté, France

- Commune
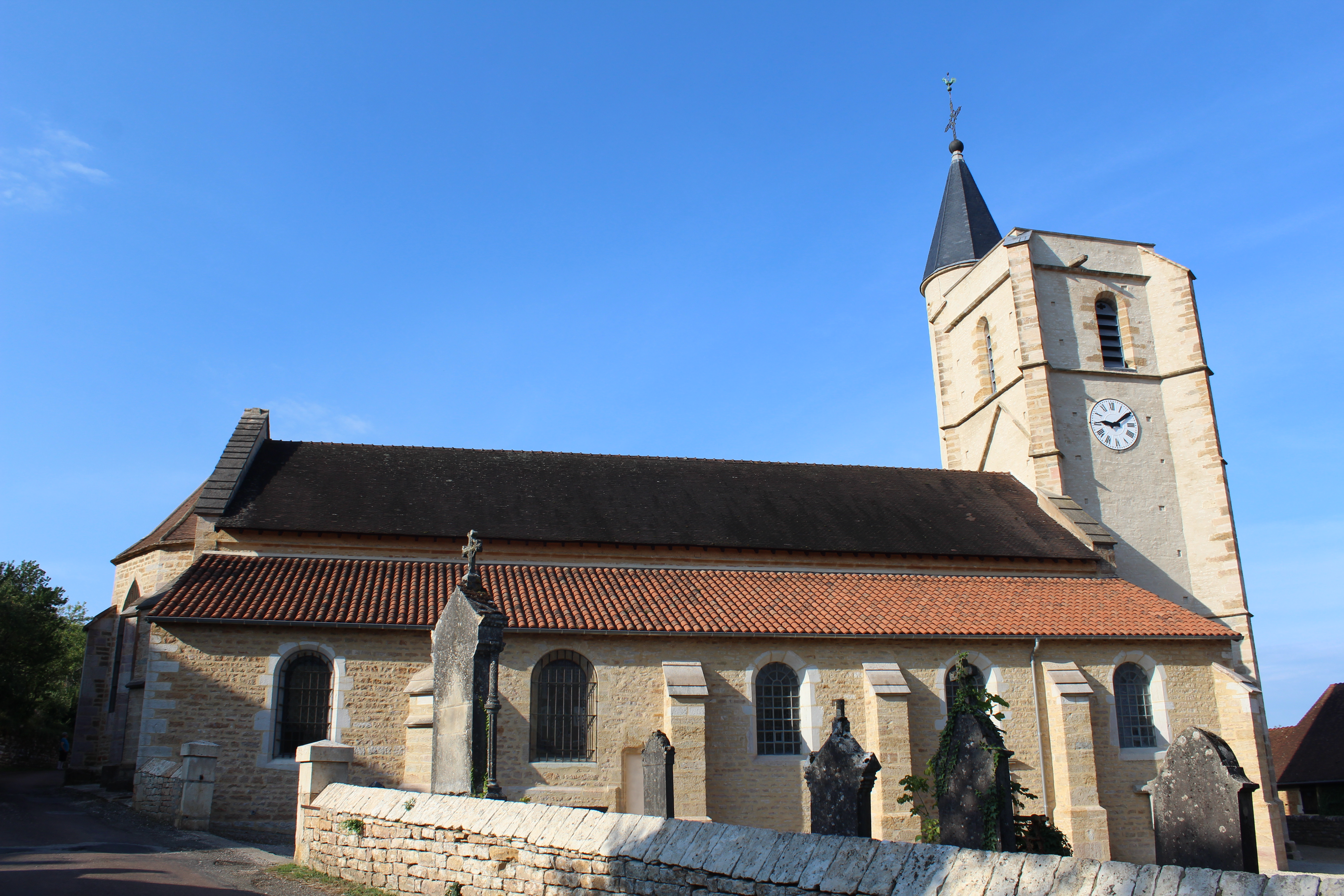
- The church in Maynal
- Location of Maynal
- Location within France Location within Bourgogne-Franche-Comté
- Coordinates: 46°33′37″N 5°25′22″E
- Country: France
- Region: Bourgogne-Franche-Comté
- Department: Jura
- Arrondissement: Lons-le-Saunier
- Canton: Saint-Amour

Government
  - Mayor (2020–2026): Christian Buchot
- Area^{1}: 8.14 km^{2} (3.14 sq mi)
- Highest elevation: 574 m (1,883 ft)
- Lowest elevation: 192 m (630 ft)
- Population (2023): 322
  - Density: 39.6/km^{2} (102/sq mi)
- Time zone: UTC+01:00 (CET)
  - Summer (DST): UTC+02:00 (CEST)
- INSEE/Postal code: 39320 /39190
- ^{1} French Land Register data, which excludes lakes, ponds, glaciers > 1 km^{2} (0.386 sq mi or 247 acres) and river estuaries.

Maynal (French pronunciation: [mɛnal]; Arpitan: Moinnau) is a commune in the Jura department in Bourgogne-Franche-Comté in eastern France.

== Population ==
Historical population
Year	Pop.	±% p.a.
1968	362	—
1975	356	−0.24%
1982	328	−1.16%
1990	312	−0.62%
1999	280	−1.20%
2007	289	+0.40%
2012	334	+2.94%
2017	338	+0.24%
2023	322	−0.80%
Source: INSEE

== See also ==
- Communes of the Jura department
