= Broissia =

Commune in Bourgogne-Franche-Comté, France

- Commune
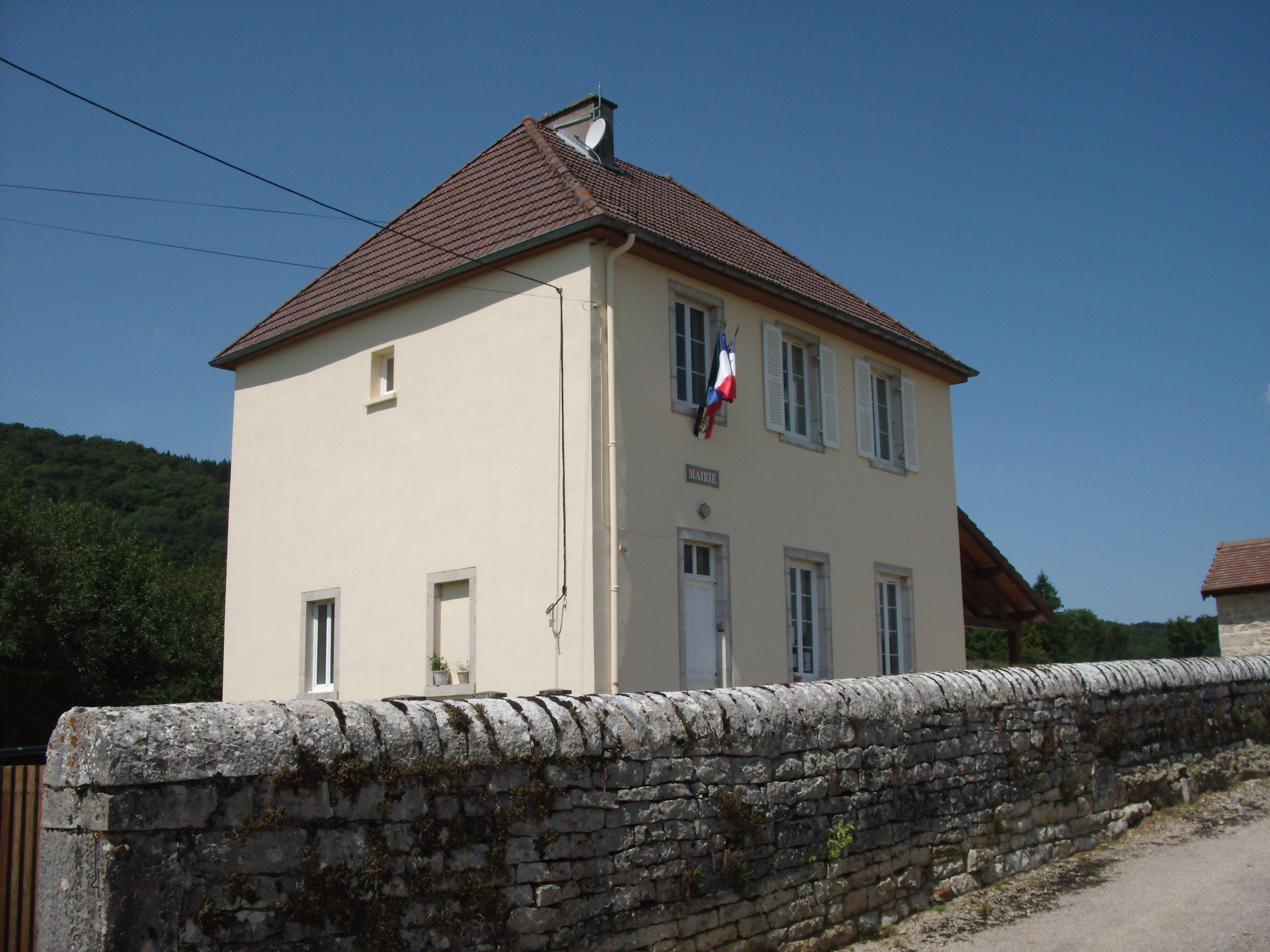
- The town hall in Broissia
- Location of Broissia
- Location within France Location within Bourgogne-Franche-Comté
- Coordinates: 46°21′38″N 5°25′53″E
- Country: France
- Region: Bourgogne-Franche-Comté
- Department: Jura
- Arrondissement: Lons-le-Saunier
- Canton: Saint-Amour

Government
  - Mayor (2020–2026): Damien Artigues
- Area^{1}: 2.97 km^{2} (1.15 sq mi)
- Highest elevation: 539 m (1,768 ft)
- Lowest elevation: 335 m (1,099 ft)
- Population (2023): 57
  - Density: 19/km^{2} (50/sq mi)
- Time zone: UTC+01:00 (CET)
  - Summer (DST): UTC+02:00 (CEST)
- INSEE/Postal code: 39080 /39320
- ^{1} French Land Register data, which excludes lakes, ponds, glaciers > 1 km^{2} (0.386 sq mi or 247 acres) and river estuaries.

Broissia (French pronunciation: [bʁwasja]) is a commune in the Jura department in Bourgogne-Franche-Comté in eastern France.

== Population ==
Historical population
Year	Pop.	±% p.a.
1968	58	—
1975	41	−4.83%
1982	33	−3.05%
1990	31	−0.78%
1999	37	+1.99%
2007	48	+3.31%
2012	52	+1.61%
2017	65	+4.56%
2023	57	−2.17%
Source: INSEE

== See also ==
- Communes of the Jura department
