= Gigny, Jura =

Commune in Bourgogne-Franche-Comté, France

Gigny
- Commune
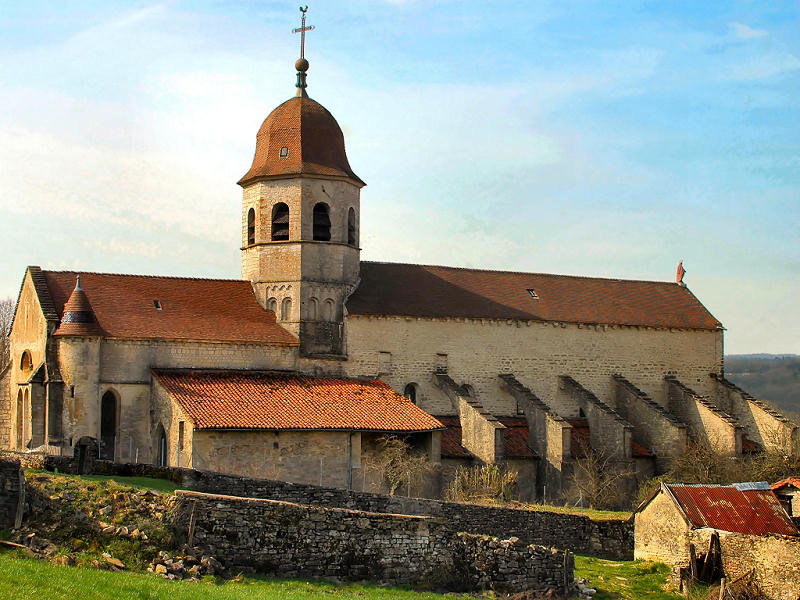
- Abbey
- Location of Gigny
- Location within France Location within Bourgogne-Franche-Comté
- Coordinates: 46°27′10″N 5°27′43″E
- Country: France
- Region: Bourgogne-Franche-Comté
- Department: Jura
- Arrondissement: Lons-le-Saunier
- Canton: Saint-Amour

Government
  - Mayor (2024–2026): Patrice Corsetti
- Area^{1}: 16.04 km^{2} (6.19 sq mi)
- Highest elevation: 579 m (1,900 ft)
- Lowest elevation: 359 m (1,178 ft)
- Population (2023): 264
  - Density: 16.5/km^{2} (42.6/sq mi)
- Time zone: UTC+01:00 (CET)
  - Summer (DST): UTC+02:00 (CEST)
- INSEE/Postal code: 39253 /39320
- ^{1} French Land Register data, which excludes lakes, ponds, glaciers > 1 km^{2} (0.386 sq mi or 247 acres) and river estuaries.

Gigny (French pronunciation: [ʒiɲi]) is a commune in the Jura department in Bourgogne-Franche-Comté in eastern France.

== Population ==
Historical population
Year	Pop.	±% p.a.
1968	268	—
1975	242	−1.45%
1982	222	−1.22%
1990	251	+1.55%
1999	260	+0.39%
2007	290	+1.37%
2012	293	+0.21%
2017	281	−0.83%
2023	264	−1.03%
Source: INSEE

== See also ==
- Communes of the Jura department
