= Cousance =

Commune in Bourgogne-Franche-Comté, France

- Commune
- The Main Street

- Coat of arms
- Location of Cousance
- Location within France Location within Bourgogne-Franche-Comté
- Coordinates: 46°31′57″N 5°23′29″E
- Country: France
- Region: Bourgogne-Franche-Comté
- Department: Jura
- Arrondissement: Lons-le-Saunier
- Canton: Saint-Amour

Government
  - Mayor (2020–2026): Christian Bretin
- Area^{1}: 6.39 km^{2} (2.47 sq mi)
- Highest elevation: 330 m (1,080 ft)
- Lowest elevation: 196 m (643 ft)
- Population (2023): 1,287
  - Density: 201/km^{2} (522/sq mi)
- Time zone: UTC+01:00 (CET)
  - Summer (DST): UTC+02:00 (CEST)
- INSEE/Postal code: 39173 /39190
- ^{1} French Land Register data, which excludes lakes, ponds, glaciers > 1 km^{2} (0.386 sq mi or 247 acres) and river estuaries.

Cousance (French pronunciation: [kuzɑ̃s]) is a commune in the Jura department in Bourgogne-Franche-Comté in eastern France.

== Population ==
Historical population
Year	Pop.	±% p.a.
1968	1,310	—
1975	1,308	−0.02%
1982	1,381	+0.78%
1990	1,274	−1.00%
1999	1,297	+0.20%
2007	1,221	−0.75%
2012	1,262	+0.66%
2017	1,308	+0.72%
2023	1,287	−0.27%
Source: INSEE

== See also ==
- Communes of the Jura department
