= Augisey =

Commune in Bourgogne-Franche-Comté, France

- Commune
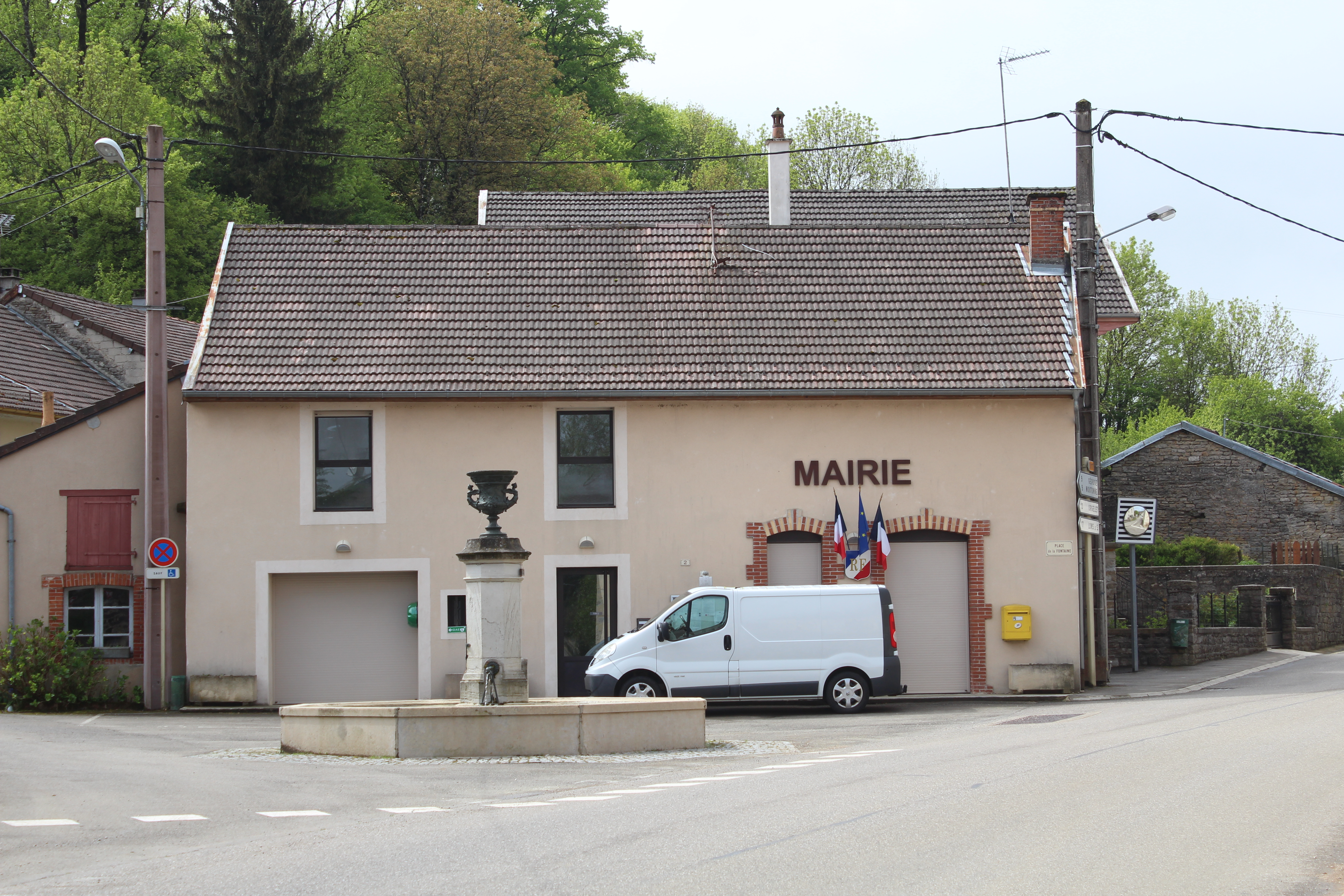
- The town hall in Augisey
- Location of Augisey
- Location within France Location within Bourgogne-Franche-Comté
- Coordinates: 46°33′14″N 5°29′36″E
- Country: France
- Region: Bourgogne-Franche-Comté
- Department: Jura
- Arrondissement: Lons-le-Saunier
- Canton: Saint-Amour
- Intercommunality: CC Porte du Jura

Government
  - Mayor (2020–2026): Daniel Blanchon
- Area^{1}: 9.29 km^{2} (3.59 sq mi)
- Highest elevation: 594 m (1,949 ft)
- Lowest elevation: 427 m (1,401 ft)
- Population (2023): 191
  - Density: 20.6/km^{2} (53.2/sq mi)
- Time zone: UTC+01:00 (CET)
  - Summer (DST): UTC+02:00 (CEST)
- INSEE/Postal code: 39027 /39270
- ^{1} French Land Register data, which excludes lakes, ponds, glaciers > 1 km^{2} (0.386 sq mi or 247 acres) and river estuaries.

Augisey (French pronunciation: [oʒizɛ]) is a commune in the Jura department in the region of Bourgogne-Franche-Comté in eastern France.

== Population ==
Historical population
| Year | Pop. | ±% p.a. |
|---|---|---|
| 1968 | 212 | — |
| 1975 | 216 | +0.27% |
| 1982 | 195 | −1.45% |
| 1990 | 186 | −0.59% |
| 1999 | 206 | +1.14% |
| 2007 | 184 | −1.40% |
| 2012 | 205 | +2.19% |
| 2017 | 201 | −0.39% |
| 2023 | 191 | −0.85% |
Source: INSEE

== See also ==
- Communes of the Jura department
