= Montrevel, Jura =

Commune in Bourgogne-Franche-Comté, France

Montrevel
- Commune
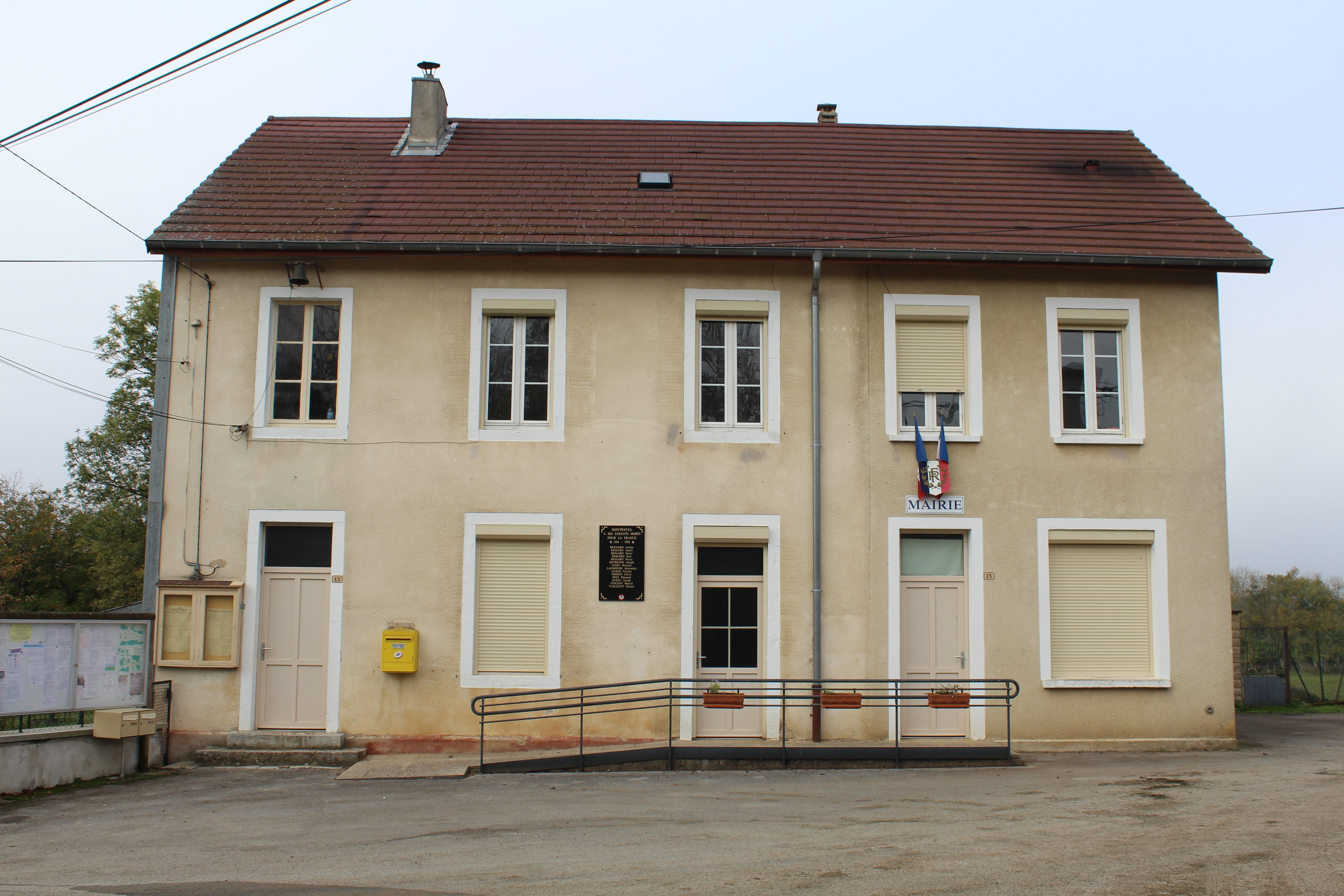
- The town hall in Montrevel
- Location of Montrevel
- Location within France Location within Bourgogne-Franche-Comté
- Coordinates: 46°25′19″N 5°29′11″E
- Country: France
- Region: Bourgogne-Franche-Comté
- Department: Jura
- Arrondissement: Lons-le-Saunier
- Canton: Saint-Amour

Government
  - Mayor (2021–2026): Nathalie Morand
- Area^{1}: 6.39 km^{2} (2.47 sq mi)
- Highest elevation: 629 m (2,064 ft)
- Lowest elevation: 370 m (1,210 ft)
- Population (2023): 83
  - Density: 13/km^{2} (34/sq mi)
- Time zone: UTC+01:00 (CET)
  - Summer (DST): UTC+02:00 (CEST)
- INSEE/Postal code: 39363 /39320
- ^{1} French Land Register data, which excludes lakes, ponds, glaciers > 1 km^{2} (0.386 sq mi or 247 acres) and river estuaries.

Montrevel is a commune in the Jura department in Bourgogne-Franche-Comté in eastern France.

== Population ==
Historical population
Year	Pop.	±% p.a.
1968	115	—
1975	141	+2.95%
1982	113	−3.11%
1990	115	+0.22%
1999	107	−0.80%
2007	90	−2.14%
2012	105	+3.13%
2017	90	−3.04%
2023	83	−1.34%
Source: INSEE

== See also ==
- Communes of the Jura department
