= Augea =

Commune in Bourgogne-Franche-Comté, France

- Commune
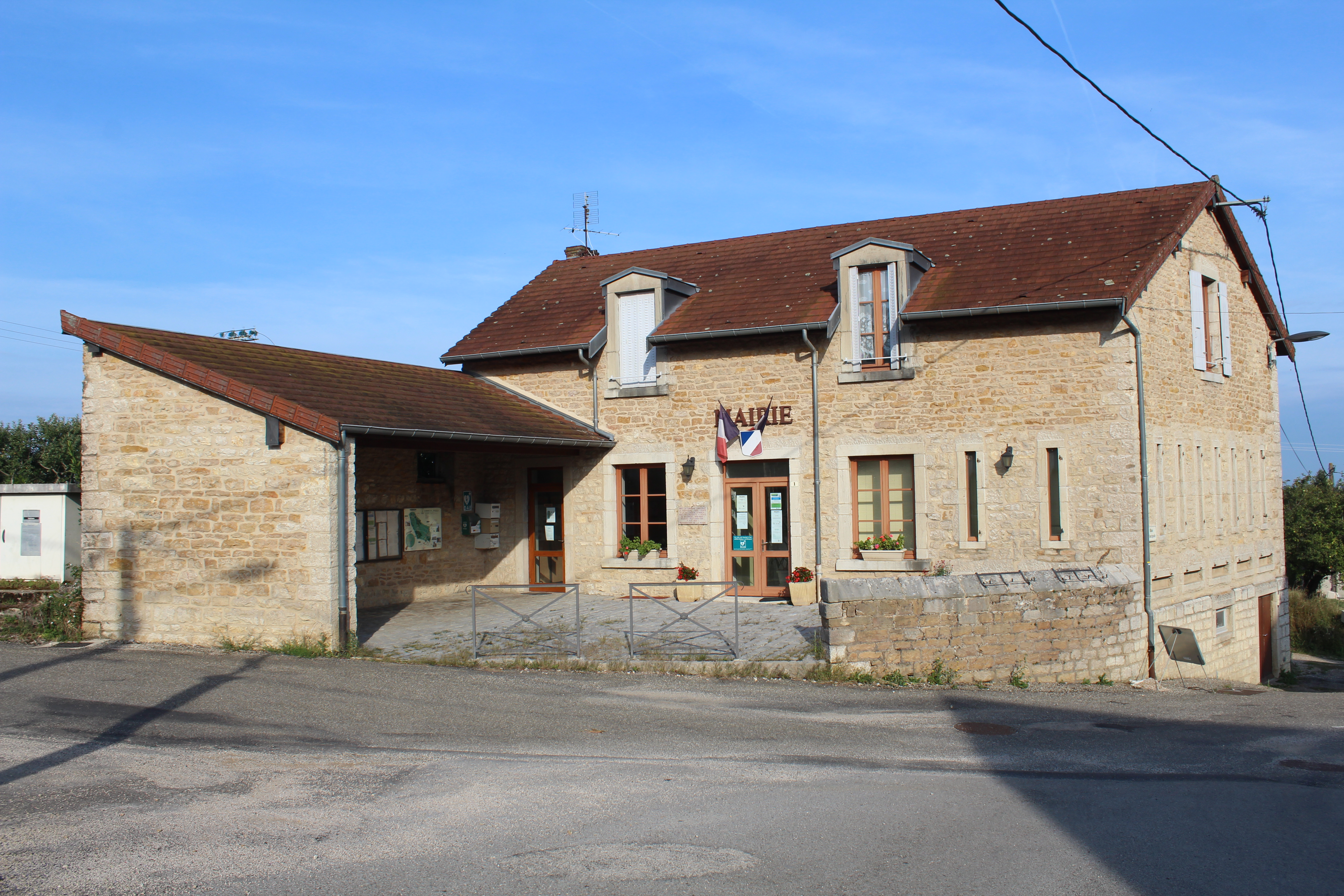
- The town hall in Augea
- Location of Augea
- Location within France Location within Bourgogne-Franche-Comté
- Coordinates: 46°33′19″N 5°24′44″E
- Country: France
- Region: Bourgogne-Franche-Comté
- Department: Jura
- Arrondissement: Lons-le-Saunier
- Canton: Saint-Amour
- Intercommunality: CC Porte Jura

Government
  - Mayor (2020–2026): Jean-Denis Amet
- Area^{1}: 7.52 km^{2} (2.90 sq mi)
- Highest elevation: 400 m (1,300 ft)
- Lowest elevation: 188 m (617 ft)
- Population (2023): 285
  - Density: 37.9/km^{2} (98.2/sq mi)
- Time zone: UTC+01:00 (CET)
  - Summer (DST): UTC+02:00 (CEST)
- INSEE/Postal code: 39025 /39190
- ^{1} French Land Register data, which excludes lakes, ponds, glaciers > 1 km^{2} (0.386 sq mi or 247 acres) and river estuaries.

Augea (French pronunciation: [oʒa]) is a commune in the Jura department in the region of Bourgogne-Franche-Comté in eastern France.

== Population ==
Historical population
Year	Pop.	±% p.a.
1968	295	—
1975	274	−1.05%
1982	243	−1.70%
1990	285	+2.01%
1999	272	−0.52%
2007	280	+0.36%
2012	296	+1.12%
2017	277	−1.32%
2023	285	+0.48%
Source: INSEE

== See also ==
- Communes of the Jura department
