= Montfleur =

Commune in Bourgogne-Franche-Comté, France

- Commune
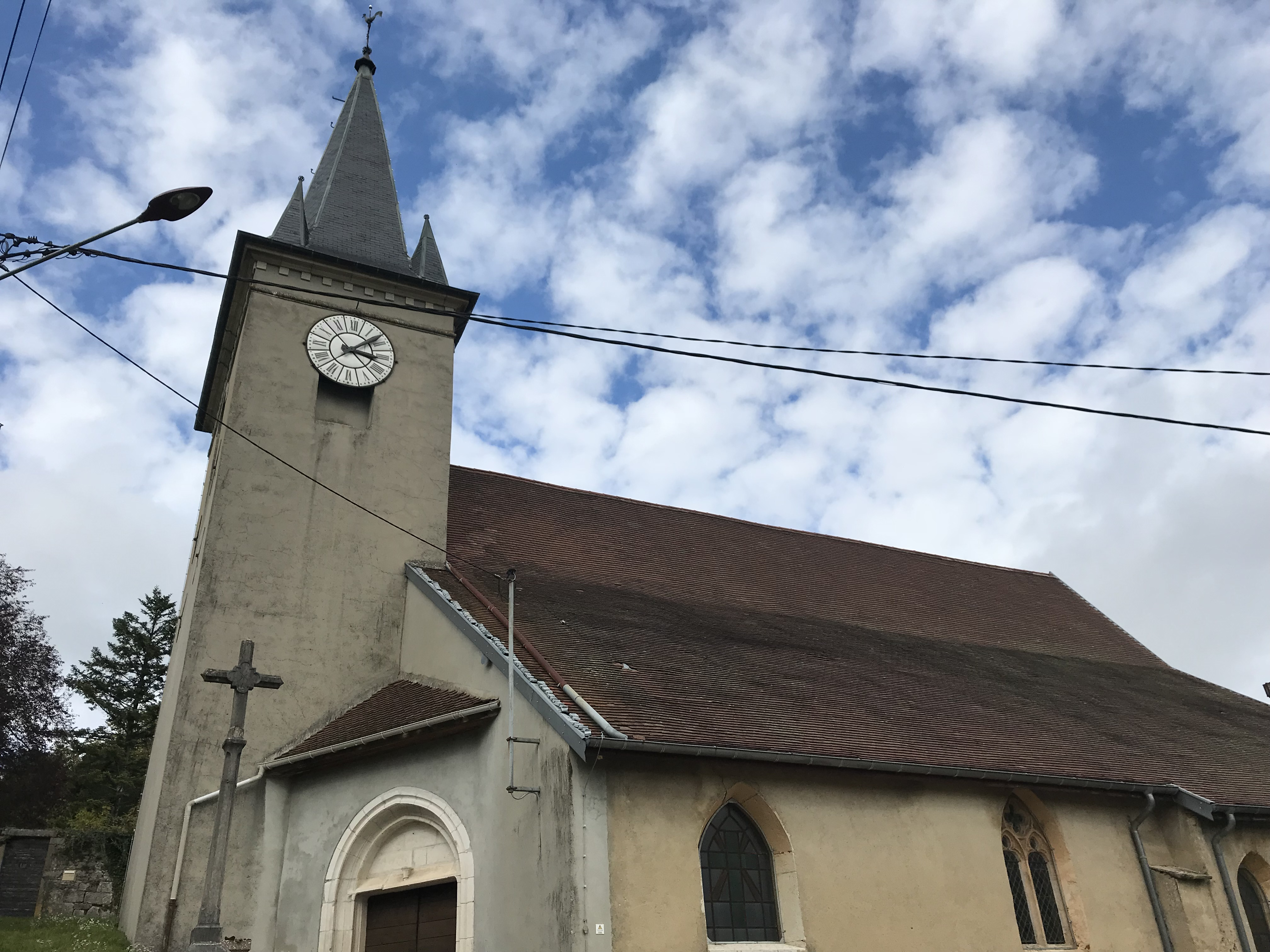
- The church in Montfleur

- Coat of arms
- Location of Montfleur
- Location within France Location within Bourgogne-Franche-Comté
- Coordinates: 46°19′50″N 5°26′14″E
- Country: France
- Region: Bourgogne-Franche-Comté
- Department: Jura
- Arrondissement: Lons-le-Saunier
- Canton: Saint-Amour

Government
  - Mayor (2020–2026): Jean-Claude Nevers
- Area^{1}: 7.88 km^{2} (3.04 sq mi)
- Highest elevation: 590 m (1,940 ft)
- Lowest elevation: 327 m (1,073 ft)
- Population (2023): 162
  - Density: 20.6/km^{2} (53.2/sq mi)
- Time zone: UTC+01:00 (CET)
  - Summer (DST): UTC+02:00 (CEST)
- INSEE/Postal code: 39353 /39320
- ^{1} French Land Register data, which excludes lakes, ponds, glaciers > 1 km^{2} (0.386 sq mi or 247 acres) and river estuaries.

Montfleur (French pronunciation: [mɔ̃flœʁ]) is a commune in the Jura department in Bourgogne-Franche-Comté in eastern France.

== See also ==
- Communes of the Jura department
