= Montlainsia =

Commune in Bourgogne-Franche-Comté, France

- Commune
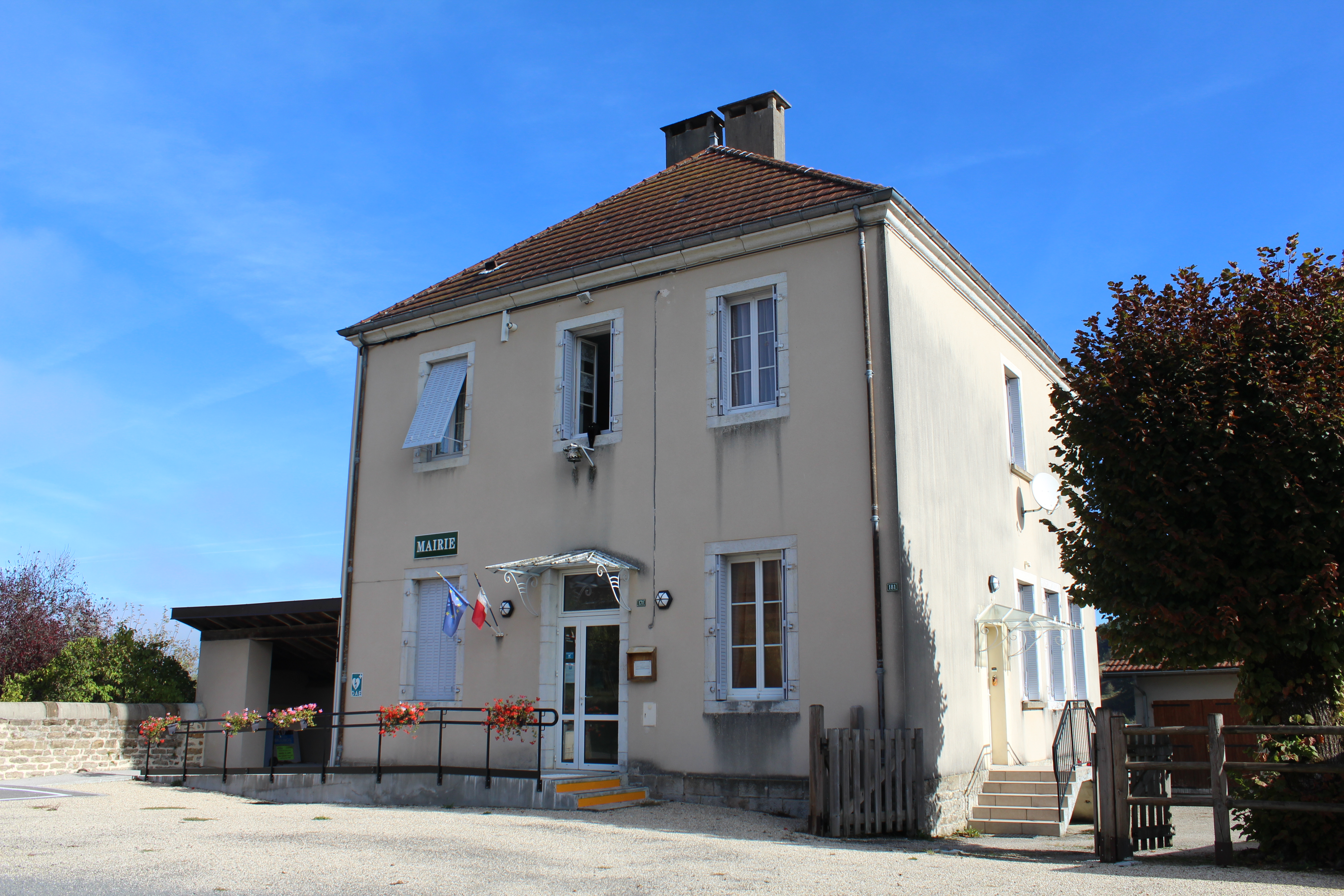
- The town hall in Montlainsia
- Location of Montlainsia
- Location within France Location within Bourgogne-Franche-Comté
- Coordinates: 46°23′28″N 5°29′17″E
- Country: France
- Region: Bourgogne-Franche-Comté
- Department: Jura
- Arrondissement: Lons-le-Saunier
- Canton: Saint-Amour

Government
  - Mayor (2020–2026): Rémy Bunod
- Area^{1}: 21.50 km^{2} (8.30 sq mi)
- Population (2023): 209
  - Density: 9.72/km^{2} (25.2/sq mi)
- Time zone: UTC+01:00 (CET)
  - Summer (DST): UTC+02:00 (CEST)
- INSEE/Postal code: 39273 /39320
- ^{1} French Land Register data, which excludes lakes, ponds, glaciers > 1 km^{2} (0.386 sq mi or 247 acres) and river estuaries.

Montlainsia (French pronunciation: [mɔ̃lɛ̃sja], literally Montlainsia) is a commune in the department of Jura, eastern France. The municipality was established on 1 January 2017 by merger of the former communes of Lains (the seat), Dessia and Montagna-le-Templier.

== See also ==
- Communes of the Jura department
