= Digna, Jura =

Commune in Bourgogne-Franche-Comté, France

Digna
- Commune
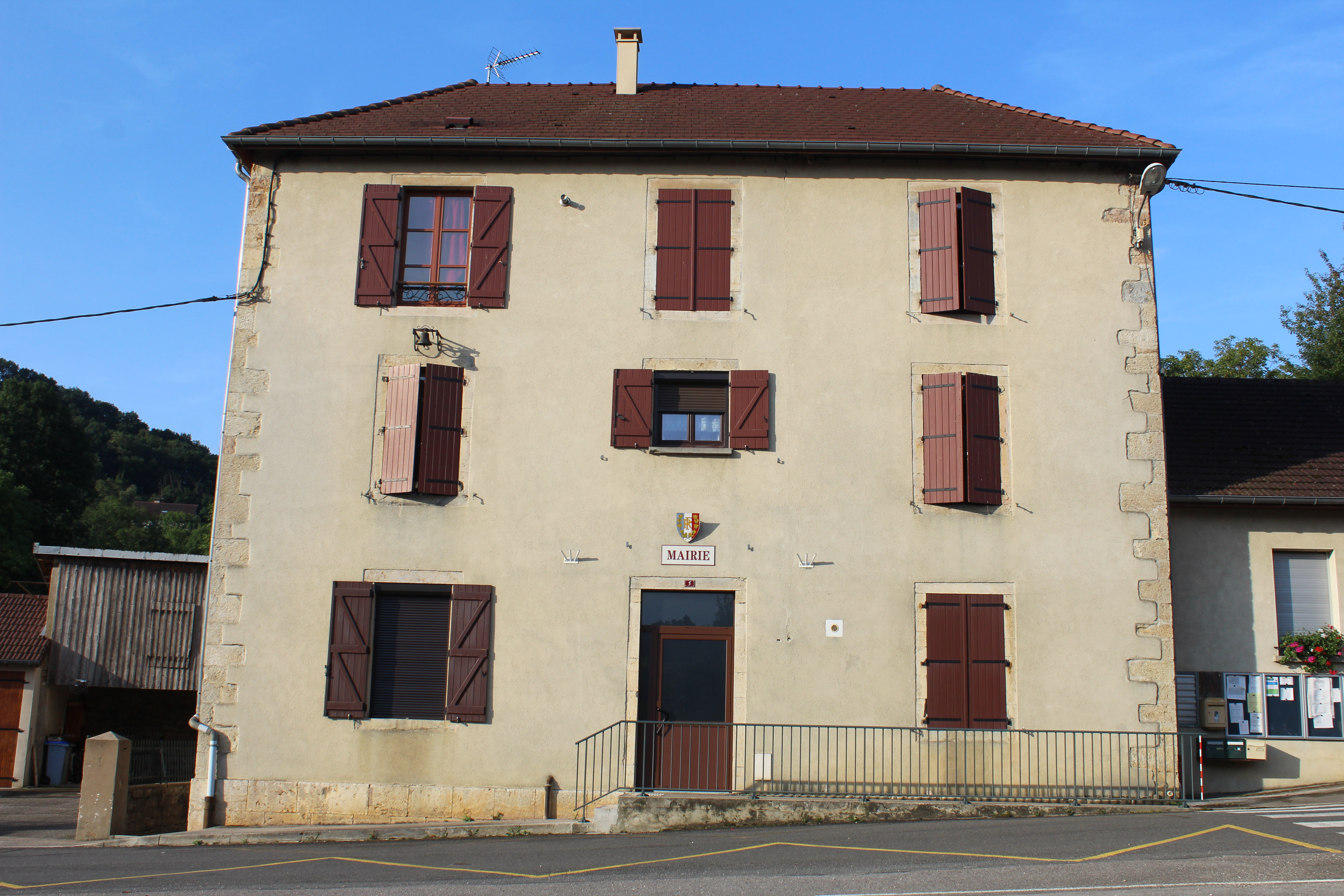
- The town hall in Digna
- Location of Digna
- Location within France Location within Bourgogne-Franche-Comté
- Coordinates: 46°31′02″N 5°23′37″E
- Country: France
- Region: Bourgogne-Franche-Comté
- Department: Jura
- Arrondissement: Lons-le-Saunier
- Canton: Saint-Amour

Government
  - Mayor (2020–2026): Jean-Christophe Gay
- Area^{1}: 3.38 km^{2} (1.31 sq mi)
- Highest elevation: 410 m (1,350 ft)
- Lowest elevation: 198 m (650 ft)
- Population (2023): 371
  - Density: 110/km^{2} (284/sq mi)
- Time zone: UTC+01:00 (CET)
  - Summer (DST): UTC+02:00 (CEST)
- INSEE/Postal code: 39197 /39190
- ^{1} French Land Register data, which excludes lakes, ponds, glaciers > 1 km^{2} (0.386 sq mi or 247 acres) and river estuaries.

Digna (French pronunciation: [diɲa]) is a commune in the Jura department in Bourgogne-Franche-Comté in eastern France.

== Population ==
Historical population
Year	Pop.	±% p.a.
1968	267	—
1975	287	+1.04%
1982	322	+1.66%
1990	326	+0.15%
1999	300	−0.92%
2007	350	+1.95%
2012	364	+0.79%
2017	350	−0.78%
2023	371	+0.98%
Source: INSEE

== See also ==
- Communes of the Jura department
