= Rosay, Jura =

Commune in Bourgogne-Franche-Comté, France

Rosay
- Commune
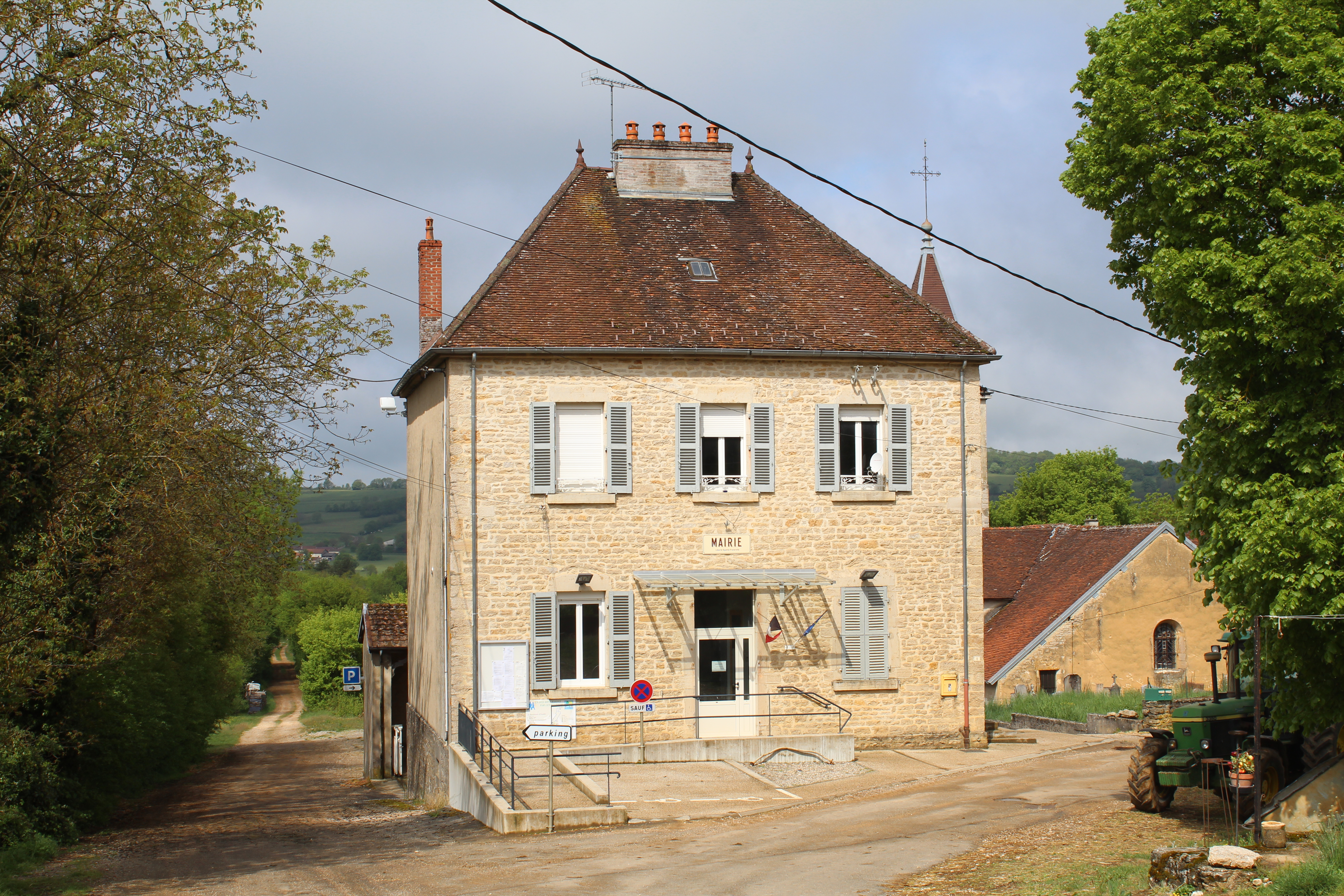
- The town hall in Rosay
- Location of Rosay
- Location within France Location within Bourgogne-Franche-Comté
- Coordinates: 46°31′56″N 5°27′08″E
- Country: France
- Region: Bourgogne-Franche-Comté
- Department: Jura
- Arrondissement: Lons-le-Saunier
- Canton: Saint-Amour

Government
  - Mayor (2020–2026): Marcel Guyot
- Area^{1}: 9.93 km^{2} (3.83 sq mi)
- Highest elevation: 637 m (2,090 ft)
- Lowest elevation: 359 m (1,178 ft)
- Population (2023): 116
  - Density: 11.7/km^{2} (30.3/sq mi)
- Time zone: UTC+01:00 (CET)
  - Summer (DST): UTC+02:00 (CEST)
- INSEE/Postal code: 39466 /39190
- ^{1} French Land Register data, which excludes lakes, ponds, glaciers > 1 km^{2} (0.386 sq mi or 247 acres) and river estuaries.

Rosay (French pronunciation: [ʁozɛ]) is a commune in the Jura department in the region of Bourgogne-Franche-Comté in eastern France.

== Population ==
Historical population
Year	Pop.	±% p.a.
1968	157	—
1975	121	−3.65%
1982	105	−2.01%
1990	114	+1.03%
1999	139	+2.23%
2007	131	−0.74%
2012	126	−0.78%
2017	125	−0.16%
2023	116	−1.24%
Source: INSEE

== See also ==
- Communes of the Jura department
