= Andelot-Morval =

Commune in Bourgogne-Franche-Comté, France

- Commune
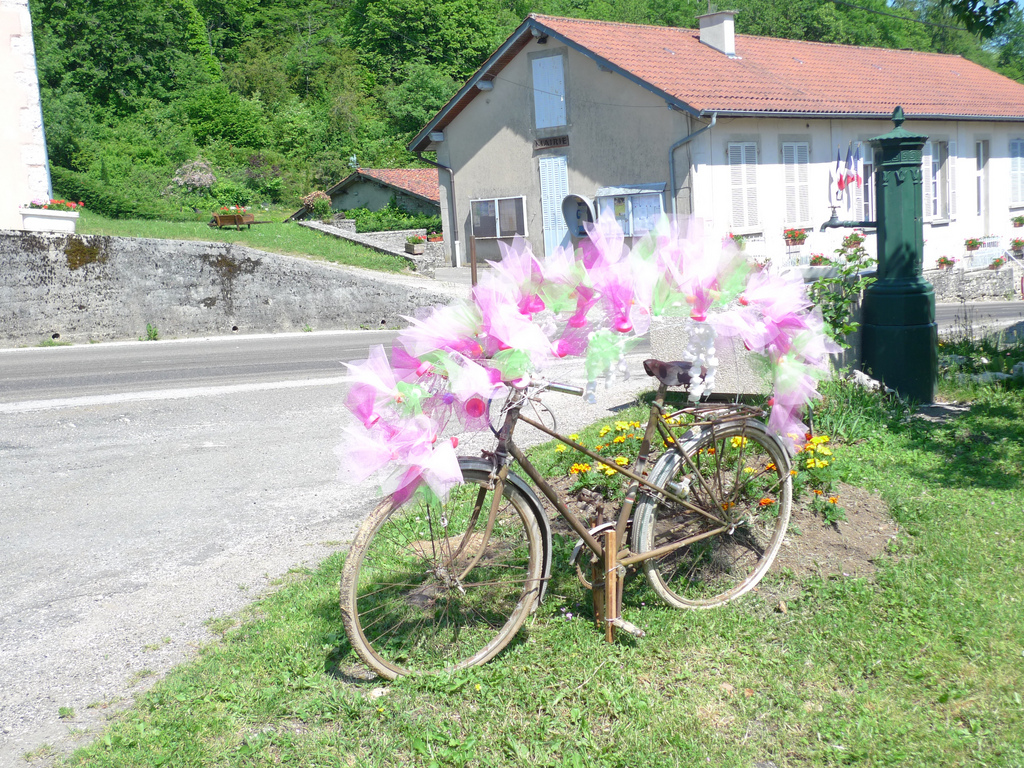
- Location of Andelot-Morval
- Location within France Location within Bourgogne-Franche-Comté
- Coordinates: 46°25′34″N 5°25′02″E
- Country: France
- Region: Bourgogne-Franche-Comté
- Department: Jura
- Arrondissement: Lons-le-Saunier
- Canton: Saint-Amour
- Intercommunality: Terre d'Émeraude Communauté

Government
  - Mayor (2020–2026): Bruno Cioe
- Area^{1}: 10.54 km^{2} (4.07 sq mi)
- Highest elevation: 593 m (1,946 ft)
- Lowest elevation: 360 m (1,180 ft)
- Population (2023): 90
  - Density: 8.5/km^{2} (22/sq mi)
- Time zone: UTC+01:00 (CET)
  - Summer (DST): UTC+02:00 (CEST)
- INSEE/Postal code: 39010 /39320
- ^{1} French Land Register data, which excludes lakes, ponds, glaciers > 1 km^{2} (0.386 sq mi or 247 acres) and river estuaries.

Andelot-Morval (French pronunciation: [ɑ̃dlo mɔʁval]) is a commune in the Jura department in the region of Bourgogne-Franche-Comté in eastern France. The commune includes Morval that was a separate commune until 1973.

== Population ==
Historical population
Year	Pop.	±% p.a.
1968	73	—
1975	58	−3.23%
1982	65	+1.64%
1990	84	+3.26%
1999	80	−0.54%
2007	90	+1.48%
2012	89	−0.22%
2017	95	+1.31%
2023	90	−0.90%
Source: INSEE

== See also ==
- Communes of the Jura department
