= Véria, Jura =

Véria
- Commune
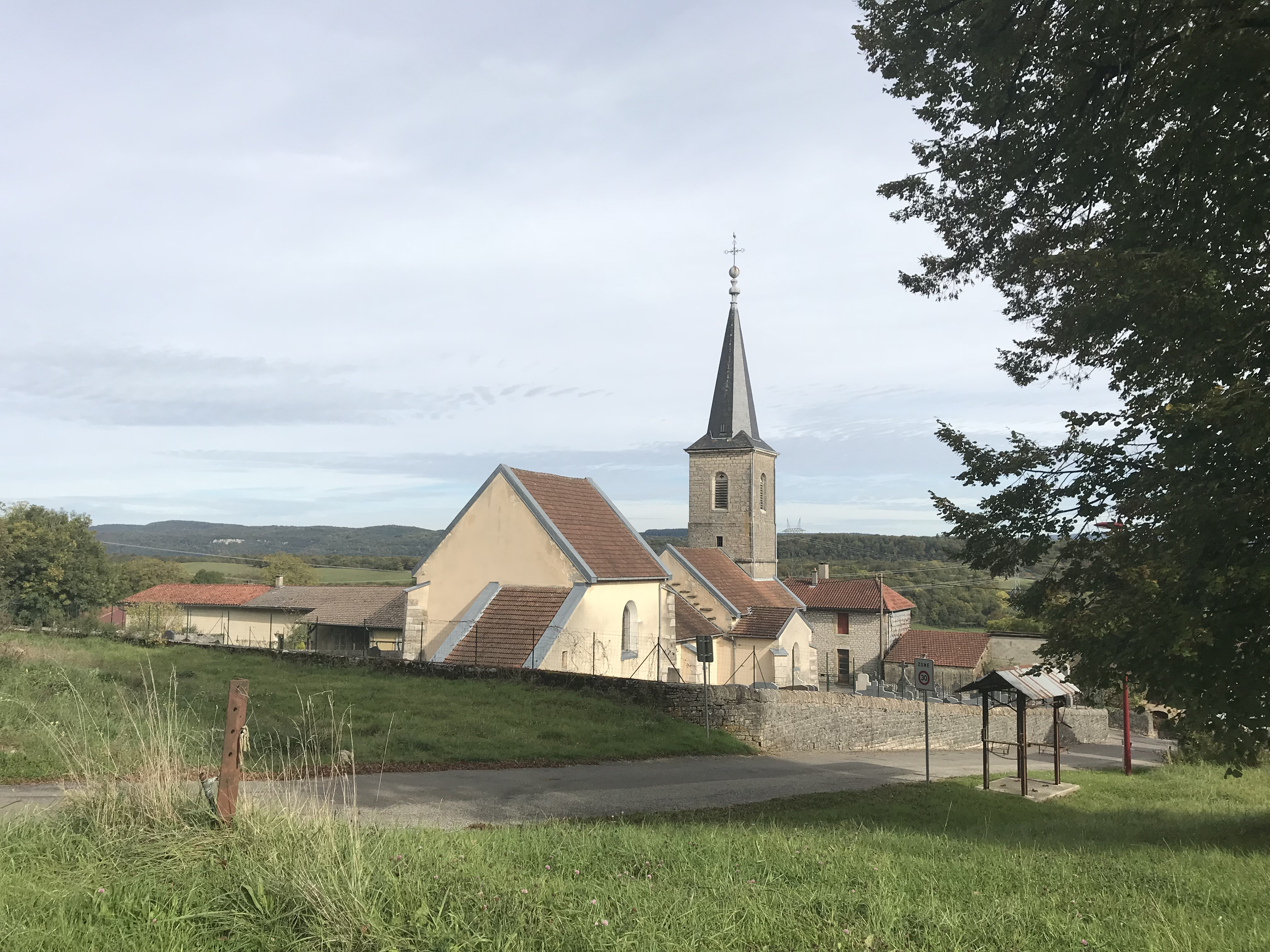
- The church in Véria
- Location of Véria
- Location within France Location within Bourgogne-Franche-Comté
- Coordinates: 46°27′07″N 5°25′29″E
- Country: France
- Region: Bourgogne-Franche-Comté
- Department: Jura
- Arrondissement: Lons-le-Saunier
- Canton: Saint-Amour

Government
  - Mayor (2020–2026): Marc-Antoine Gagliardi
- Area^{1}: 10.09 km^{2} (3.90 sq mi)
- Highest elevation: 642 m (2,106 ft)
- Lowest elevation: 377 m (1,237 ft)
- Population (2023): 111
  - Density: 11.0/km^{2} (28.5/sq mi)
- Time zone: UTC+01:00 (CET)
  - Summer (DST): UTC+02:00 (CEST)
- INSEE/Postal code: 39551 /39160
- ^{1} French Land Register data, which excludes lakes, ponds, glaciers > 1 km^{2} (0.386 sq mi or 247 acres) and river estuaries.

Véria (French pronunciation: [veʁja]) is a commune in the Jura department in the Bourgogne-Franche-Comté region in eastern France.

== Population ==
Historical population
Year	Pop.	±% p.a.
1968	185	—
1975	141	−3.81%
1982	135	−0.62%
1990	122	−1.26%
1999	118	−0.37%
2007	136	+1.79%
2012	132	−0.60%
2017	117	−2.38%
2023	111	−0.87%
Source: INSEE

== See also ==
- Communes of the Jura department
