= Canton of Saint-Amour =

Canton of France

Coordinates: 46.44°N 5.34°E

The canton of Saint-Amour is an administrative division of the Jura department, eastern France. Its borders were modified at the French canton reorganisation which came into effect in March 2015. Its seat is in Saint-Amour.

== Communes ==
Canton of Sain-Amour has the following communes:

1. Andelot-Morval
2. Augea
3. Augisey
4. Balanod
5. Beaufort-Orbagna
6. Broissia
7. Cesancey
8. La Chailleuse
9. Chevreaux
10. Cousance
11. Cressia
12. Cuisia
13. Digna
14. Gigny
15. Gizia
16. Graye-et-Charnay
17. Loisia
18. Mallerey
19. Maynal
20. Monnetay
21. Montagna-le-Reconduit
22. Montfleur
23. Montlainsia
24. Montrevel
25. Rosay
26. Rotalier
27. Saint-Amour
28. Thoissia
29. Les Trois-Châteaux
30. Val-d'Épy
31. Val-Sonnette
32. Val Suran
33. Véria
