= Onglières =

Commune in Bourgogne-Franche-Comté, France

- Commune
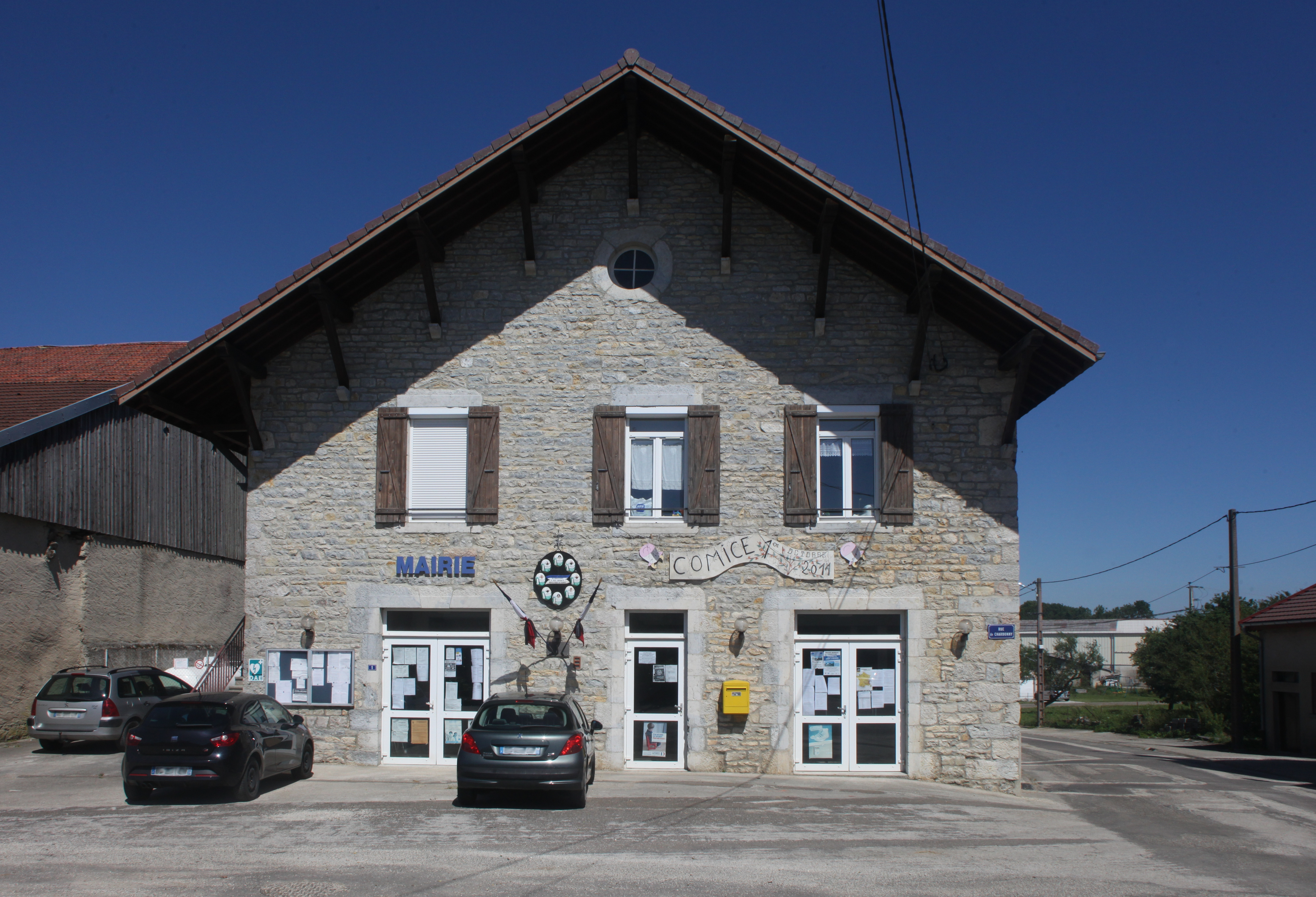
- The town hall in Onglières
- Location of Onglières
- Location within France Location within Bourgogne-Franche-Comté
- Coordinates: 46°47′46″N 6°00′42″E
- Country: France
- Region: Bourgogne-Franche-Comté
- Department: Jura
- Arrondissement: Lons-le-Saunier
- Canton: Saint-Laurent-en-Grandvaux

Government
  - Mayor (2020–2026): Thibaut Ferreux
- Area^{1}: 8.99 km^{2} (3.47 sq mi)
- Highest elevation: 892 m (2,927 ft)
- Lowest elevation: 728 m (2,388 ft)
- Population (2023): 70
  - Density: 7.8/km^{2} (20/sq mi)
- Time zone: UTC+01:00 (CET)
  - Summer (DST): UTC+02:00 (CEST)
- INSEE/Postal code: 39393 /39250
- ^{1} French Land Register data, which excludes lakes, ponds, glaciers > 1 km^{2} (0.386 sq mi or 247 acres) and river estuaries.

Onglières (French pronunciation: [ɔ̃ɡlijɛʁ]) is a commune in the Jura department in Bourgogne-Franche-Comté in eastern France.

== Population ==
Historical population
Year	Pop.	±% p.a.
1968	94	—
1975	77	−2.81%
1982	79	+0.37%
1990	60	−3.38%
1999	70	+1.73%
2007	74	+0.70%
2012	71	−0.82%
2017	65	−1.75%
2023	70	+1.24%
Source: INSEE

== See also ==
- Communes of the Jura department
