= Bief-des-Maisons =

Commune in Bourgogne-Franche-Comté, France

- Commune
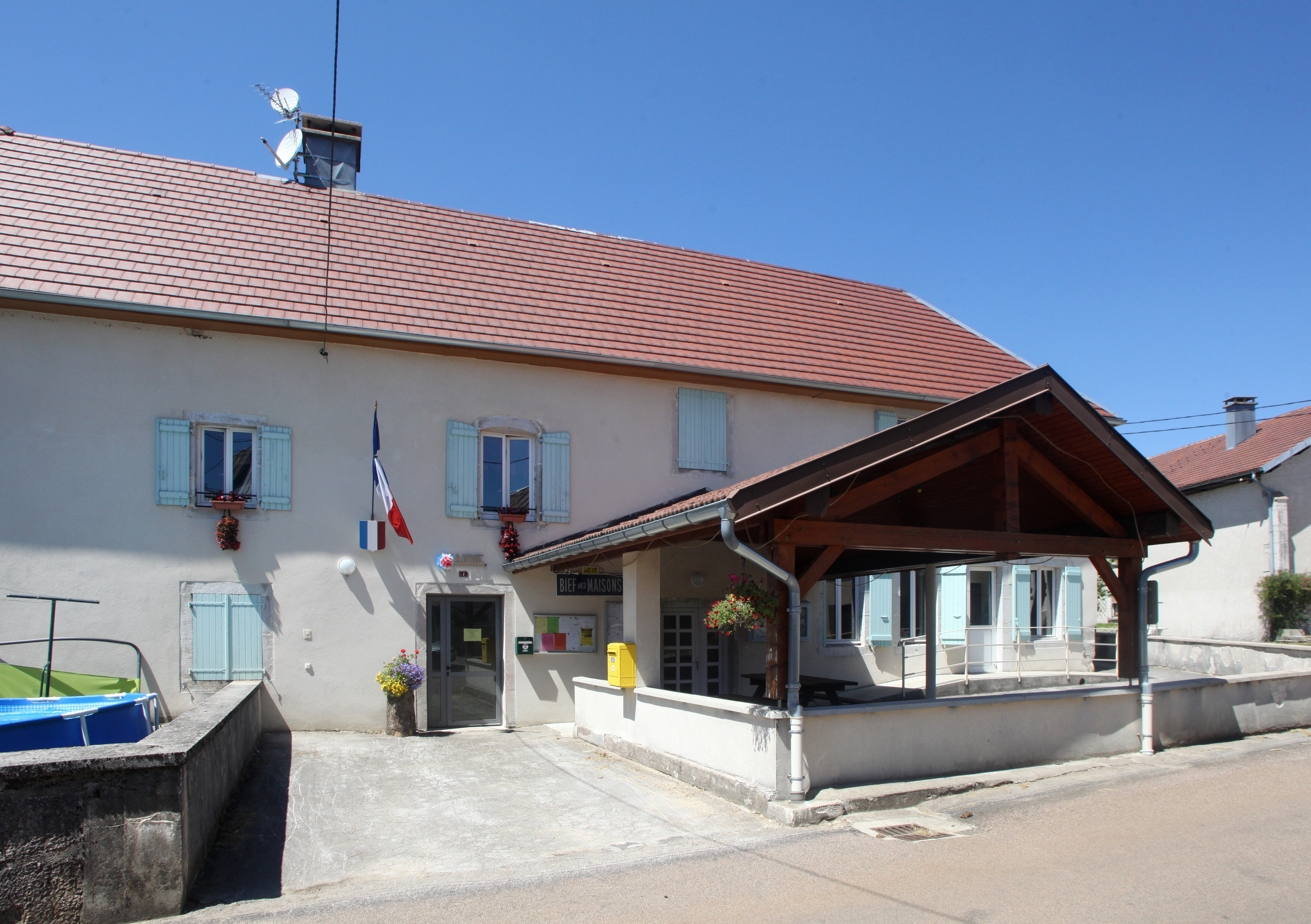
- The town hall in Bief-des-Maisons
- Location of Bief-des-Maisons
- Location within France Location within Bourgogne-Franche-Comté
- Coordinates: 46°42′25″N 6°02′25″E
- Country: France
- Region: Bourgogne-Franche-Comté
- Department: Jura
- Arrondissement: Lons-le-Saunier
- Canton: Saint-Laurent-en-Grandvaux

Government
  - Mayor (2020–2026): Daniel Mathieu
- Area^{1}: 5.79 km^{2} (2.24 sq mi)
- Highest elevation: 1,144 m (3,753 ft)
- Lowest elevation: 890 m (2,920 ft)
- Population (2023): 78
  - Density: 13/km^{2} (35/sq mi)
- Time zone: UTC+01:00 (CET)
  - Summer (DST): UTC+02:00 (CEST)
- INSEE/Postal code: 39052 /39150
- ^{1} French Land Register data, which excludes lakes, ponds, glaciers > 1 km^{2} (0.386 sq mi or 247 acres) and river estuaries.

Bief-des-Maisons is a commune in the Jura department in the region of Bourgogne-Franche-Comté in eastern France.

== Population ==
Historical population
Year	Pop.	±% p.a.
1968	131	—
1975	106	−2.98%
1982	96	−1.41%
1990	74	−3.20%
1999	85	+1.55%
2007	65	−3.30%
2012	76	+3.18%
2017	72	−1.08%
2023	78	+1.34%
Source: INSEE

== See also ==
- Communes of the Jura department
