= Cuvier, Jura =

Commune in Bourgogne-Franche-Comté, France

Cuvier
- Commune
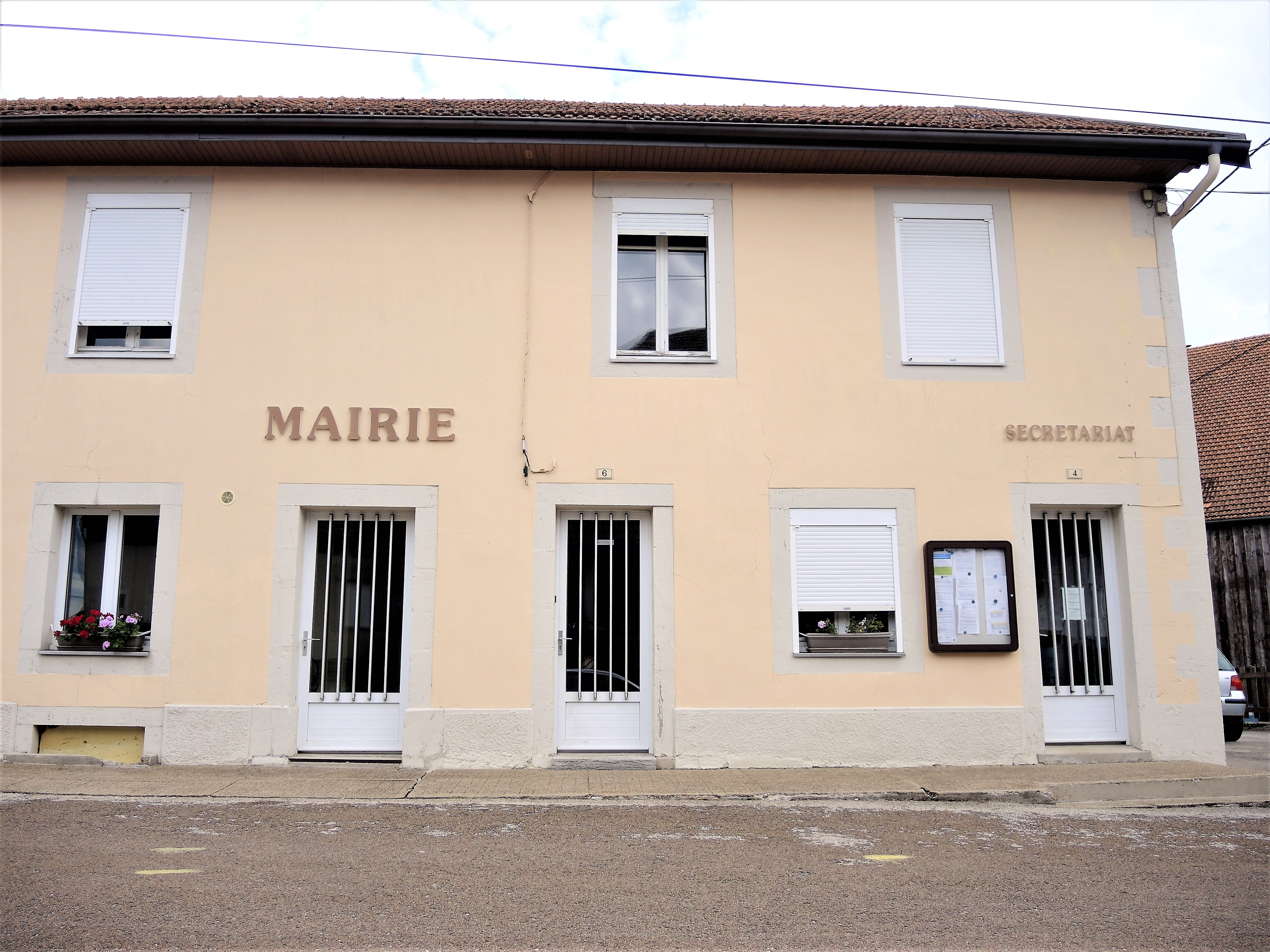
- The town hall in Cuvier
- Location of Cuvier
- Location within France Location within Bourgogne-Franche-Comté
- Coordinates: 46°49′40″N 6°04′10″E
- Country: France
- Region: Bourgogne-Franche-Comté
- Department: Jura
- Arrondissement: Lons-le-Saunier
- Canton: Saint-Laurent-en-Grandvaux

Government
  - Mayor (2024–2026): Vincent Jeannot
- Area^{1}: 10.32 km^{2} (3.98 sq mi)
- Highest elevation: 885 m (2,904 ft)
- Lowest elevation: 798 m (2,618 ft)
- Population (2023): 277
  - Density: 26.8/km^{2} (69.5/sq mi)
- Time zone: UTC+01:00 (CET)
  - Summer (DST): UTC+02:00 (CEST)
- INSEE/Postal code: 39187 /39250
- ^{1} French Land Register data, which excludes lakes, ponds, glaciers > 1 km^{2} (0.386 sq mi or 247 acres) and river estuaries.

Cuvier (French pronunciation: [kyvje]) is a commune in the Jura department in Bourgogne-Franche-Comté in eastern France.

== Population ==
Historical population
Year	Pop.	±% p.a.
1968	203	—
1975	192	−0.79%
1982	201	+0.66%
1990	201	+0.00%
1999	168	−1.97%
2007	215	+3.13%
2012	228	+1.18%
2017	262	+2.82%
2023	277	+0.93%
Source: INSEE

== See also ==
- Communes of the Jura department
