= Plénisette =

Commune in Bourgogne-Franche-Comté, France

- Commune
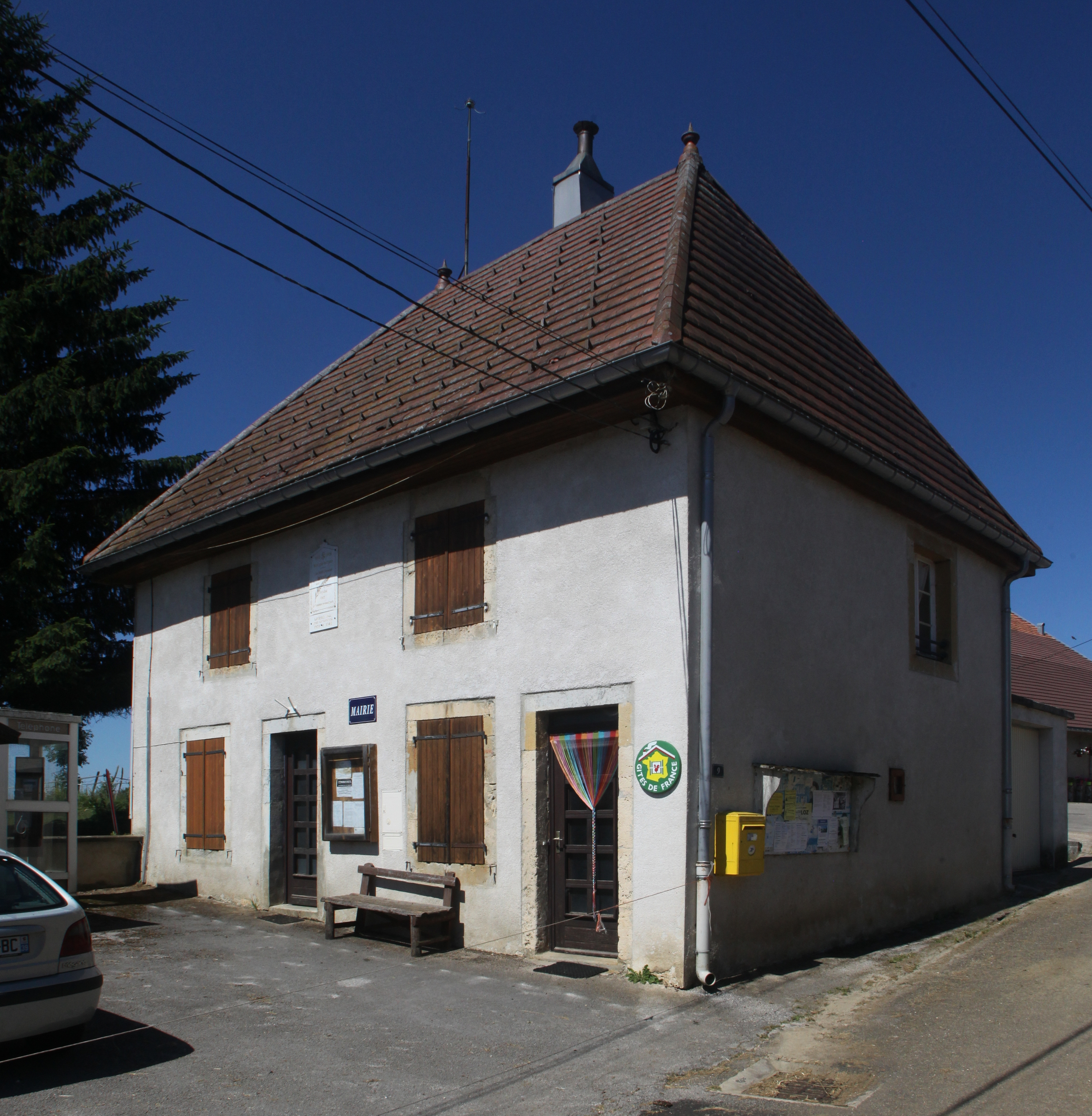
- The town hall in Plénisette
- Location of Plénisette
- Location within France Location within Bourgogne-Franche-Comté
- Coordinates: 46°48′01″N 6°01′19″E
- Country: France
- Region: Bourgogne-Franche-Comté
- Department: Jura
- Arrondissement: Lons-le-Saunier
- Canton: Saint-Laurent-en-Grandvaux

Government
  - Mayor (2020–2026): Véronique Cassus
- Area^{1}: 2.61 km^{2} (1.01 sq mi)
- Highest elevation: 890 m (2,920 ft)
- Lowest elevation: 750 m (2,460 ft)
- Population (2023): 20
  - Density: 7.7/km^{2} (20/sq mi)
- Time zone: UTC+01:00 (CET)
  - Summer (DST): UTC+02:00 (CEST)
- INSEE/Postal code: 39428 /39250
- ^{1} French Land Register data, which excludes lakes, ponds, glaciers > 1 km^{2} (0.386 sq mi or 247 acres) and river estuaries.

Plénisette (French pronunciation: [plenizɛt]) is a commune in the Jura department in Bourgogne-Franche-Comté in eastern France.

== Population ==
Historical population
Year	Pop.	±% p.a.
1968	29	—
1975	24	−2.67%
1982	21	−1.89%
1990	23	+1.14%
1999	30	+3.00%
2007	37	+2.66%
2012	23	−9.07%
2017	25	+1.68%
2023	20	−3.65%
Source: INSEE

== See also ==
- Communes of the Jura department
