= Fraroz =

Commune in Bourgogne-Franche-Comté, France

- Commune
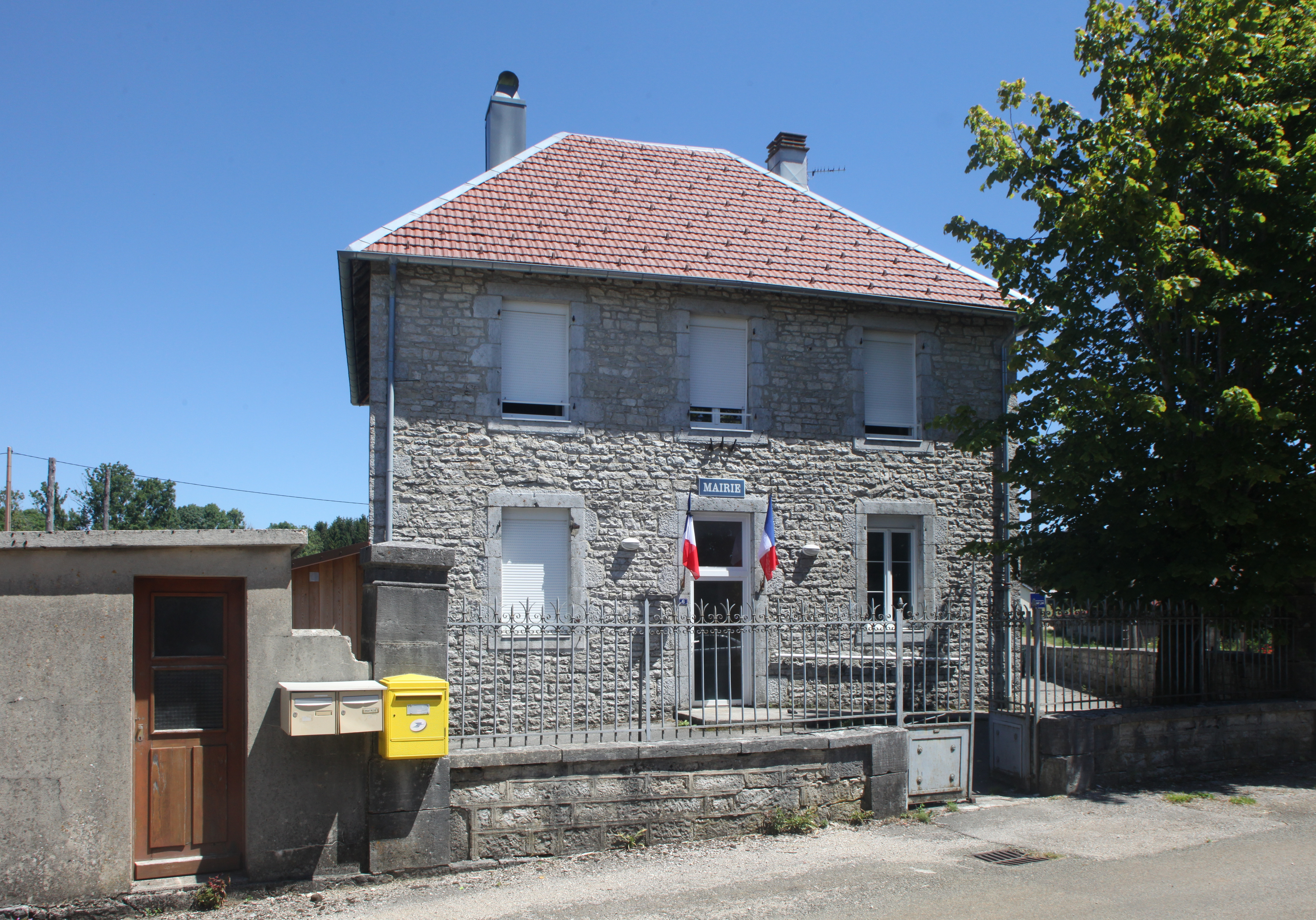
- The town hall in Fraroz
- Location of Fraroz
- Location within France Location within Bourgogne-Franche-Comté
- Coordinates: 46°44′05″N 6°05′32″E
- Country: France
- Region: Bourgogne-Franche-Comté
- Department: Jura
- Arrondissement: Lons-le-Saunier
- Canton: Saint-Laurent-en-Grandvaux

Government
  - Mayor (2020–2026): Christophe Damnon
- Area^{1}: 6.22 km^{2} (2.40 sq mi)
- Highest elevation: 1,222 m (4,009 ft)
- Lowest elevation: 889 m (2,917 ft)
- Population (2023): 58
  - Density: 9.3/km^{2} (24/sq mi)
- Time zone: UTC+01:00 (CET)
  - Summer (DST): UTC+02:00 (CEST)
- INSEE/Postal code: 39237 /39250
- ^{1} French Land Register data, which excludes lakes, ponds, glaciers > 1 km^{2} (0.386 sq mi or 247 acres) and river estuaries.

Fraroz (French pronunciation: [fʁaʁo]) is a commune in the Jura department in Bourgogne-Franche-Comté in eastern France.

== Population ==
Historical population
Year	Pop.	±% p.a.
1968	47	—
1975	42	−1.59%
1982	43	+0.34%
1990	40	−0.90%
1999	41	+0.27%
2007	50	+2.51%
2012	46	−1.65%
2017	49	+1.27%
2023	58	+2.85%
Source: INSEE

== See also ==
- Communes of the Jura department
