= Denezières =

Commune in Bourgogne-Franche-Comté, France

- Commune
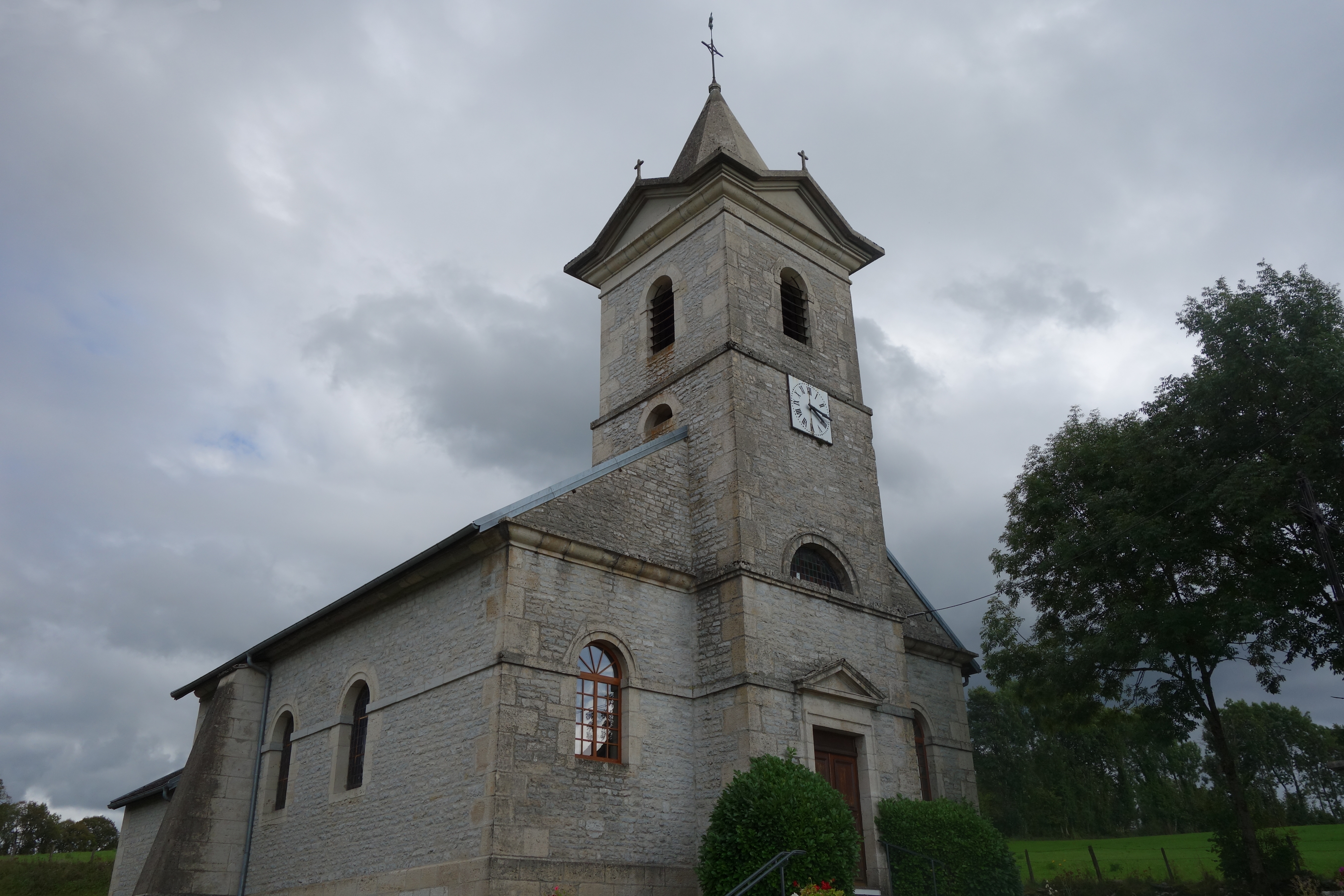
- The church in Denezières
- Location of Denezières
- Location within France Location within Bourgogne-Franche-Comté
- Coordinates: 46°36′41″N 5°48′30″E
- Country: France
- Region: Bourgogne-Franche-Comté
- Department: Jura
- Arrondissement: Lons-le-Saunier
- Canton: Saint-Laurent-en-Grandvaux

Government
  - Mayor (2020–2026): Philippe Chauvin
- Area^{1}: 6.41 km^{2} (2.47 sq mi)
- Highest elevation: 673 m (2,208 ft)
- Lowest elevation: 519 m (1,703 ft)
- Population (2023): 73
  - Density: 11/km^{2} (29/sq mi)
- Time zone: UTC+01:00 (CET)
  - Summer (DST): UTC+02:00 (CEST)
- INSEE/Postal code: 39192 /39130
- ^{1} French Land Register data, which excludes lakes, ponds, glaciers > 1 km^{2} (0.386 sq mi or 247 acres) and river estuaries.

Denezières (French pronunciation: [dənzjɛʁ]) is a commune in the Jura department in Bourgogne-Franche-Comté in eastern France.

== Population ==
Historical population
Year	Pop.	±% p.a.
1968	88	—
1975	68	−3.62%
1982	93	+4.57%
1990	89	−0.55%
1999	78	−1.46%
2007	78	+0.00%
2012	82	+1.01%
2017	72	−2.57%
2023	73	+0.23%
Source: INSEE

== See also ==
- Communes of the Jura department
