= Charency =

Commune in Bourgogne-Franche-Comté, France

- Commune
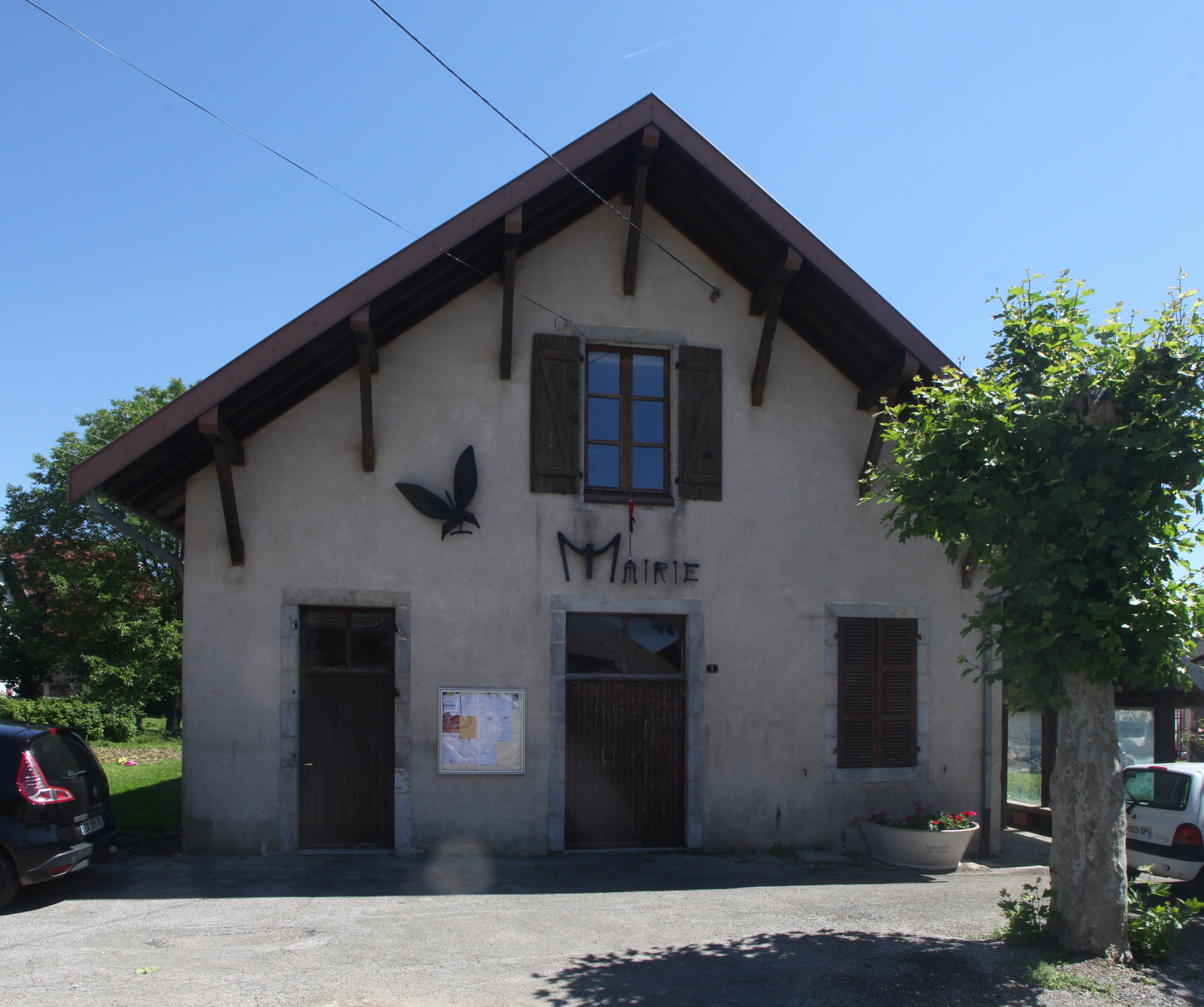
- The town hall in Charency
- Location of Charency
- Location within France Location within Bourgogne-Franche-Comté
- Coordinates: 46°46′15″N 5°59′41″E
- Country: France
- Region: Bourgogne-Franche-Comté
- Department: Jura
- Arrondissement: Lons-le-Saunier
- Canton: Saint-Laurent-en-Grandvaux

Government
  - Mayor (2021–2026): Sylvie Guy
- Area^{1}: 2.73 km^{2} (1.05 sq mi)
- Highest elevation: 804 m (2,638 ft)
- Lowest elevation: 630 m (2,070 ft)
- Population (2023): 55
  - Density: 20/km^{2} (52/sq mi)
- Time zone: UTC+01:00 (CET)
  - Summer (DST): UTC+02:00 (CEST)
- INSEE/Postal code: 39108 /39250
- ^{1} French Land Register data, which excludes lakes, ponds, glaciers > 1 km^{2} (0.386 sq mi or 247 acres) and river estuaries.

Charency (French pronunciation: [ʃaʁɑ̃si]) is a commune in the Jura department in Bourgogne-Franche-Comté in eastern France.

== Population ==
Historical population
Year	Pop.	±% p.a.
1968	45	—
1975	40	−1.67%
1982	37	−1.11%
1990	35	−0.69%
1999	41	+1.77%
2007	52	+3.02%
2012	57	+1.85%
2017	55	−0.71%
2023	55	+0.00%
Source: INSEE

== See also ==
- Communes of the Jura department
