= Patornay =

Commune in Bourgogne-Franche-Comté, France

- Commune
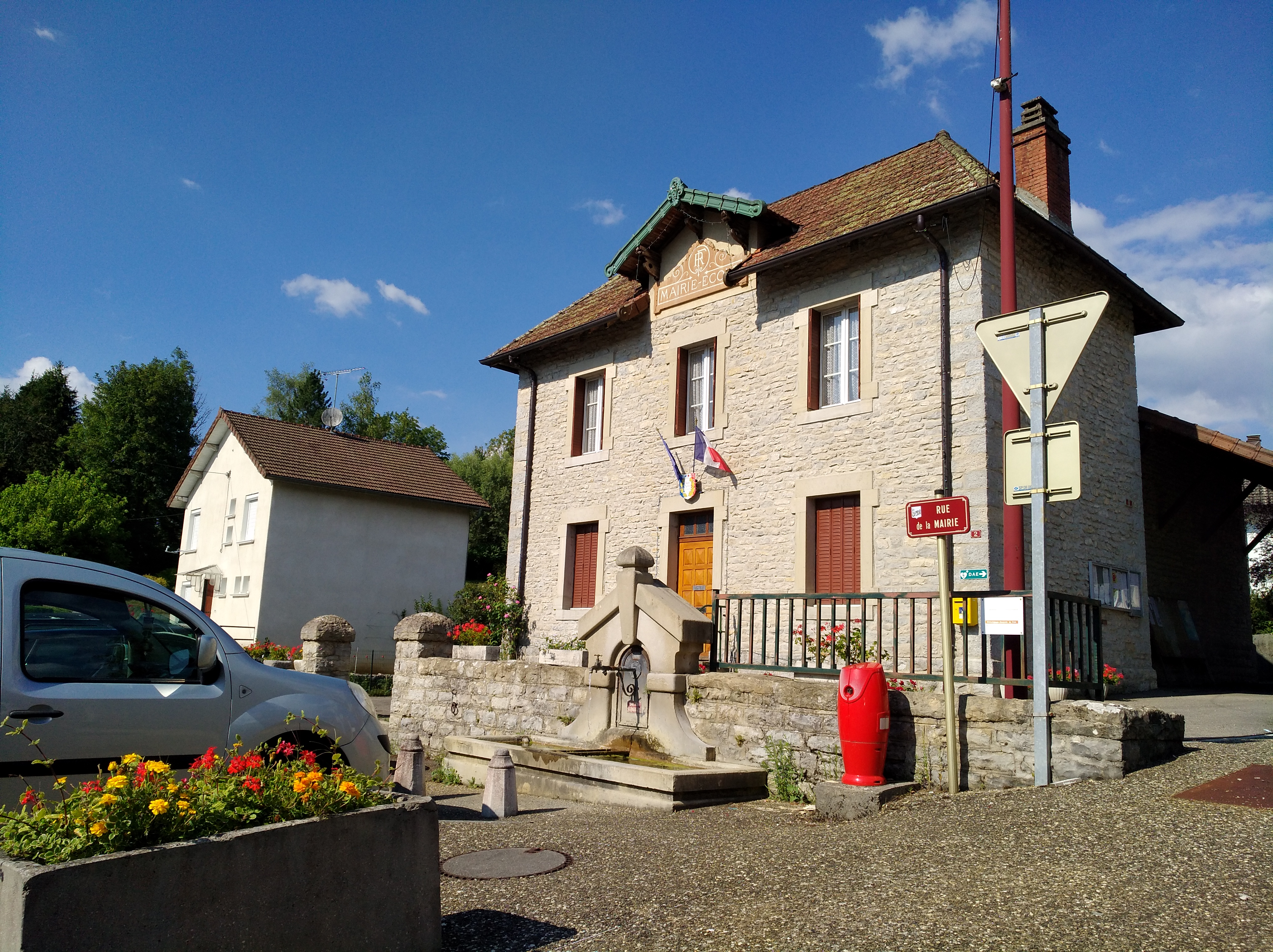
- Town hall of Patornay.

- Coat of arms
- Location of Patornay
- Location within France Location within Bourgogne-Franche-Comté
- Coordinates: 46°35′14″N 5°42′17″E
- Country: France
- Region: Bourgogne-Franche-Comté
- Department: Jura
- Arrondissement: Lons-le-Saunier
- Canton: Saint-Laurent-en-Grandvaux

Government
  - Mayor (2020–2026): Catherine Devaux
- Area^{1}: 1.80 km^{2} (0.69 sq mi)
- Highest elevation: 479 m (1,572 ft)
- Lowest elevation: 429 m (1,407 ft)
- Population (2023): 154
  - Density: 85.6/km^{2} (222/sq mi)
- Time zone: UTC+01:00 (CET)
  - Summer (DST): UTC+02:00 (CEST)
- INSEE/Postal code: 39408 /39130
- ^{1} French Land Register data, which excludes lakes, ponds, glaciers > 1 km^{2} (0.386 sq mi or 247 acres) and river estuaries.

Patornay (French pronunciation: [patɔʁnɛ]) is a commune in the Jura department in Bourgogne-Franche-Comté in eastern France.

== Population ==
Historical population
Year	Pop.	±% p.a.
1968	192	—
1975	172	−1.56%
1982	173	+0.08%
1990	162	−0.82%
1999	170	+0.54%
2007	140	−2.40%
2012	139	−0.14%
2017	140	+0.14%
2023	154	+1.60%
Source: INSEE

== See also ==
- Communes of the Jura department
