= La Frasnée =

Commune in Bourgogne-Franche-Comté, France

- Commune
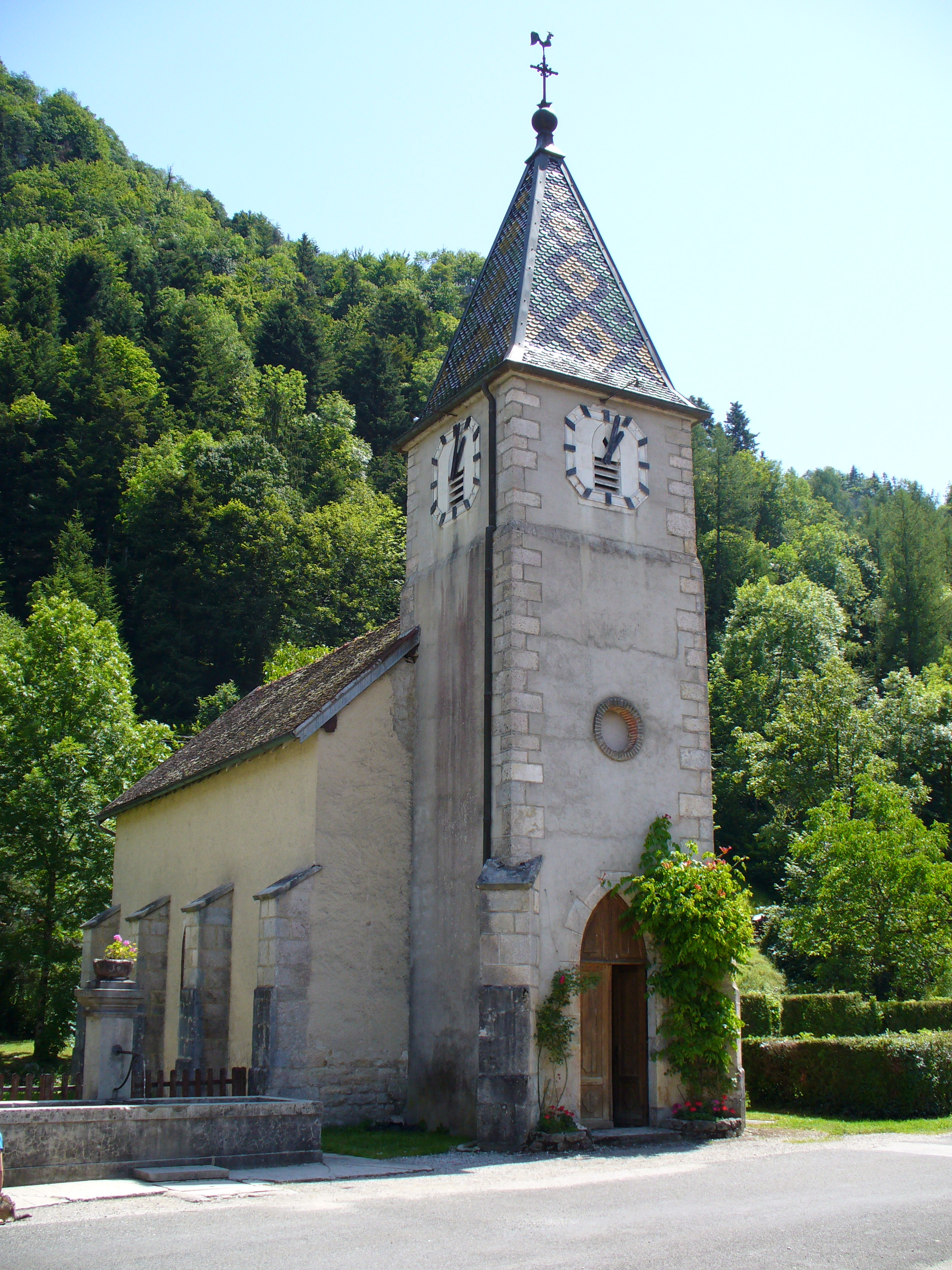
- The church in La Frasnée
- Location of La Frasnée
- Location within France Location within Bourgogne-Franche-Comté
- Coordinates: 46°33′27″N 5°48′41″E
- Country: France
- Region: Bourgogne-Franche-Comté
- Department: Jura
- Arrondissement: Lons-le-Saunier
- Canton: Saint-Laurent-en-Grandvaux

Government
  - Mayor (2022–2026): Laurent Laruade
- Area^{1}: 3.19 km^{2} (1.23 sq mi)
- Highest elevation: 775 m (2,543 ft)
- Lowest elevation: 538 m (1,765 ft)
- Population (2023): 41
  - Density: 13/km^{2} (33/sq mi)
- Time zone: UTC+01:00 (CET)
  - Summer (DST): UTC+02:00 (CEST)
- INSEE/Postal code: 39239 /39130
- ^{1} French Land Register data, which excludes lakes, ponds, glaciers > 1 km^{2} (0.386 sq mi or 247 acres) and river estuaries.

La Frasnée (French pronunciation: [la fʁane]) is a commune in the Jura department in Bourgogne-Franche-Comté in eastern France.

== Population ==
Historical population
Year	Pop.	±% p.a.
1968	51	—
1975	64	+3.30%
1982	47	−4.31%
1990	39	−2.31%
1999	41	+0.56%
2007	40	−0.31%
2012	37	−1.55%
2017	39	+1.06%
2023	41	+0.84%
Source: INSEE

== See also ==
- Communes of the Jura department
