= Bief-du-Fourg =

Commune in Bourgogne-Franche-Comté, France

- Commune
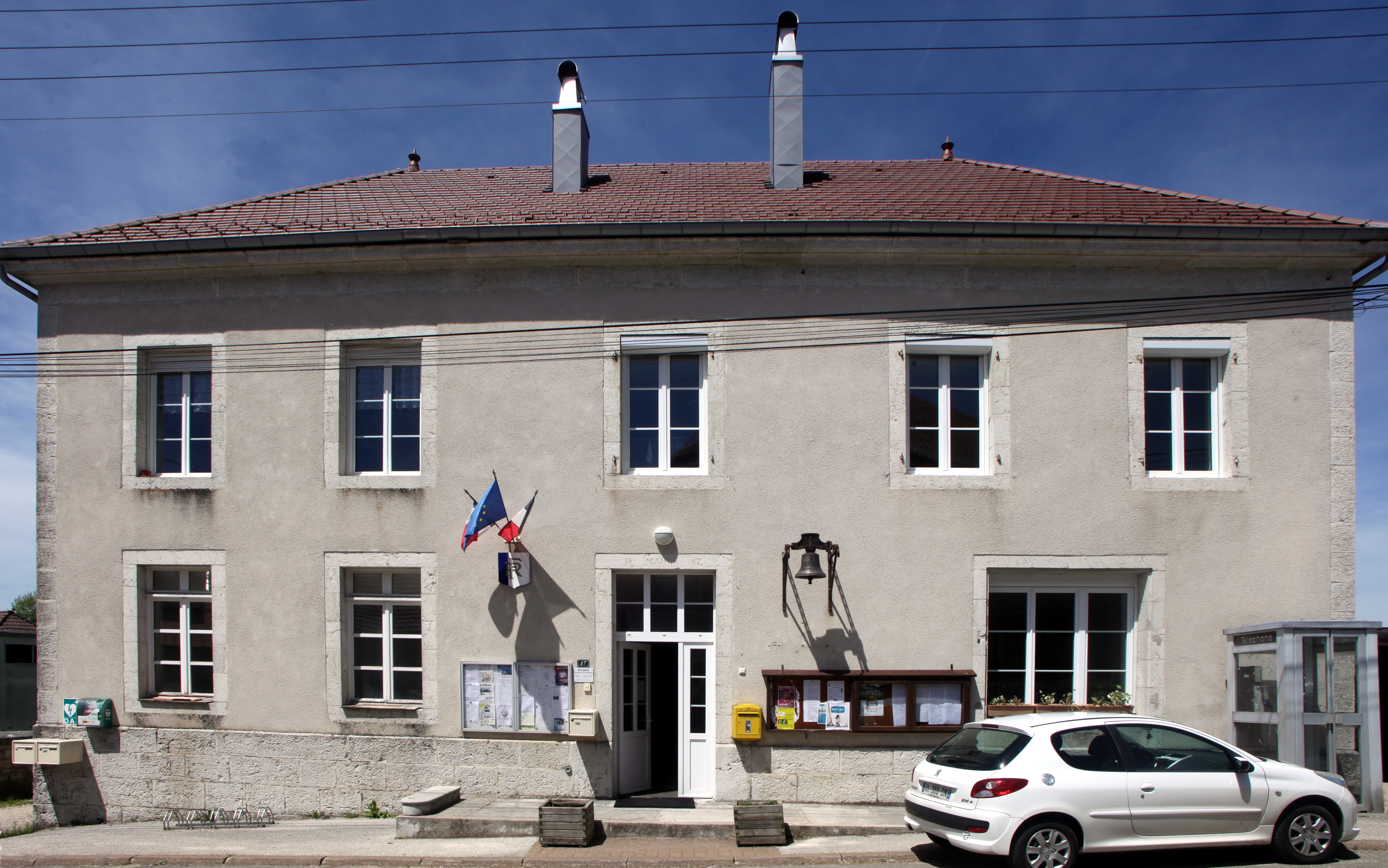
- The town hall in Bief-du-Fourg
- Location of Bief-du-Fourg
- Location within France Location within Bourgogne-Franche-Comté
- Coordinates: 46°48′37″N 6°06′36″E
- Country: France
- Region: Bourgogne-Franche-Comté
- Department: Jura
- Arrondissement: Lons-le-Saunier
- Canton: Saint-Laurent-en-Grandvaux

Government
  - Mayor (2020–2026): François Paget
- Area^{1}: 10.20 km^{2} (3.94 sq mi)
- Highest elevation: 883 m (2,897 ft)
- Lowest elevation: 840 m (2,760 ft)
- Population (2023): 218
  - Density: 21.4/km^{2} (55.4/sq mi)
- Time zone: UTC+01:00 (CET)
  - Summer (DST): UTC+02:00 (CEST)
- INSEE/Postal code: 39053 /39250
- ^{1} French Land Register data, which excludes lakes, ponds, glaciers > 1 km^{2} (0.386 sq mi or 247 acres) and river estuaries.

Bief-du-Fourg is a commune in the Jura department in the region of Bourgogne-Franche-Comté in eastern France.

== Population ==
Historical population
Year	Pop.	±% p.a.
1968	150	—
1975	125	−2.57%
1982	136	+1.21%
1990	122	−1.35%
1999	131	+0.79%
2007	154	+2.04%
2012	172	+2.24%
2017	203	+3.37%
2023	218	+1.20%
Source: INSEE

== See also ==
- Communes of the Jura department
