= Esserval-Tartre =

Commune in Bourgogne-Franche-Comté, France

- Commune
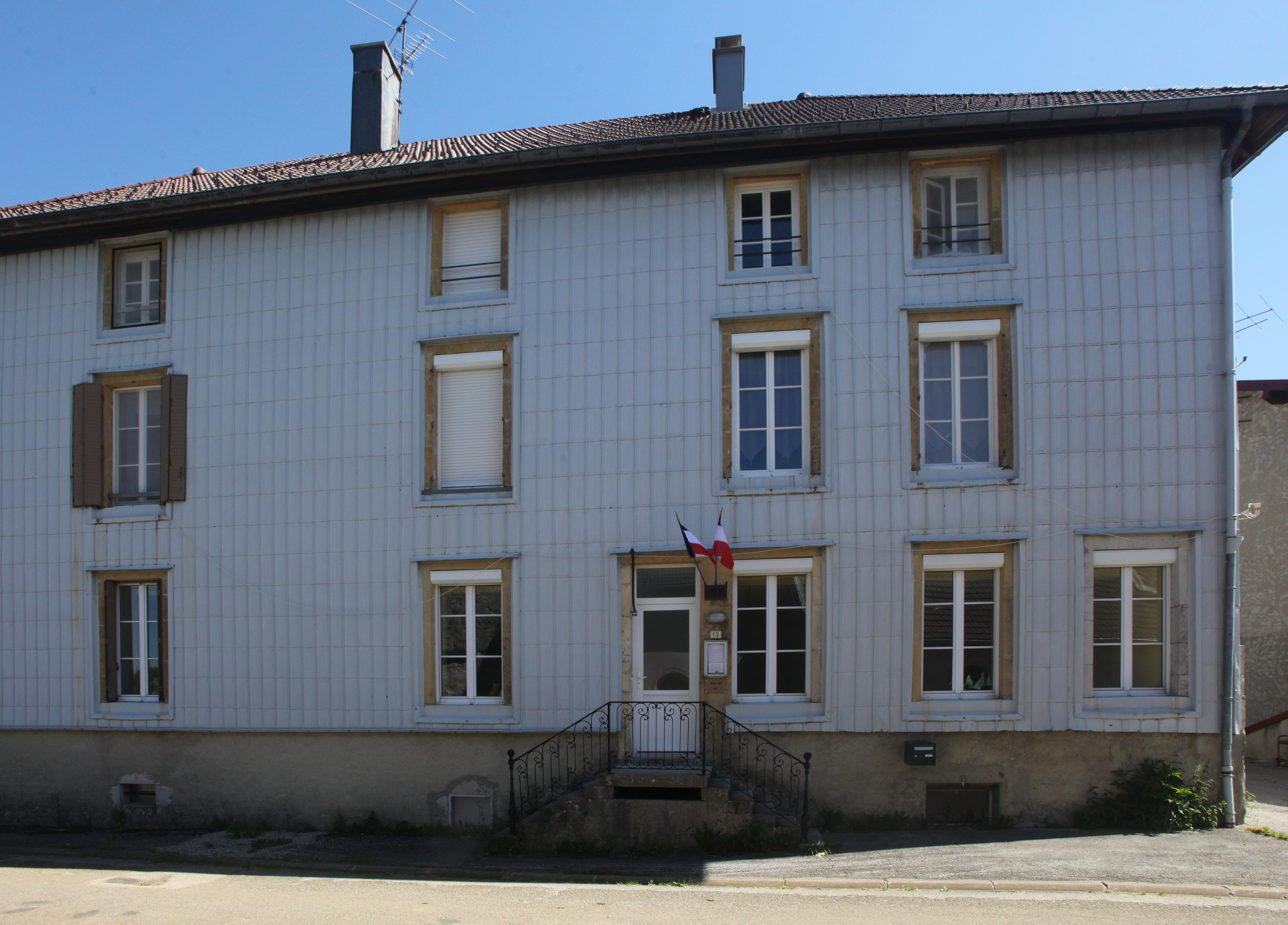
- The town hall in Esserval-Tartre
- Location of Esserval-Tartre
- Location within France Location within Bourgogne-Franche-Comté
- Coordinates: 46°48′34″N 6°02′46″E
- Country: France
- Region: Bourgogne-Franche-Comté
- Department: Jura
- Arrondissement: Lons-le-Saunier
- Canton: Saint-Laurent-en-Grandvaux

Government
  - Mayor (2020–2026): Jean-Noël Ferreux
- Area^{1}: 12.19 km^{2} (4.71 sq mi)
- Highest elevation: 904 m (2,966 ft)
- Lowest elevation: 730 m (2,400 ft)
- Population (2023): 140
  - Density: 11/km^{2} (30/sq mi)
- Time zone: UTC+01:00 (CET)
  - Summer (DST): UTC+02:00 (CEST)
- INSEE/Postal code: 39214 /39250
- ^{1} French Land Register data, which excludes lakes, ponds, glaciers > 1 km^{2} (0.386 sq mi or 247 acres) and river estuaries.

Esserval-Tartre (French pronunciation: [ɛsɛʁval taʁtʁ]) is a commune in the Jura department in Bourgogne-Franche-Comté in eastern France.

== Population ==
Historical population
Year	Pop.	±% p.a.
1968	110	—
1975	84	−3.78%
1982	101	+2.67%
1990	85	−2.13%
1999	69	−2.29%
2007	79	+1.71%
2012	103	+5.45%
2017	119	+2.93%
2023	140	+2.75%
Source: INSEE

== See also ==
- Communes of the Jura department
