= Soucia =

- Commune
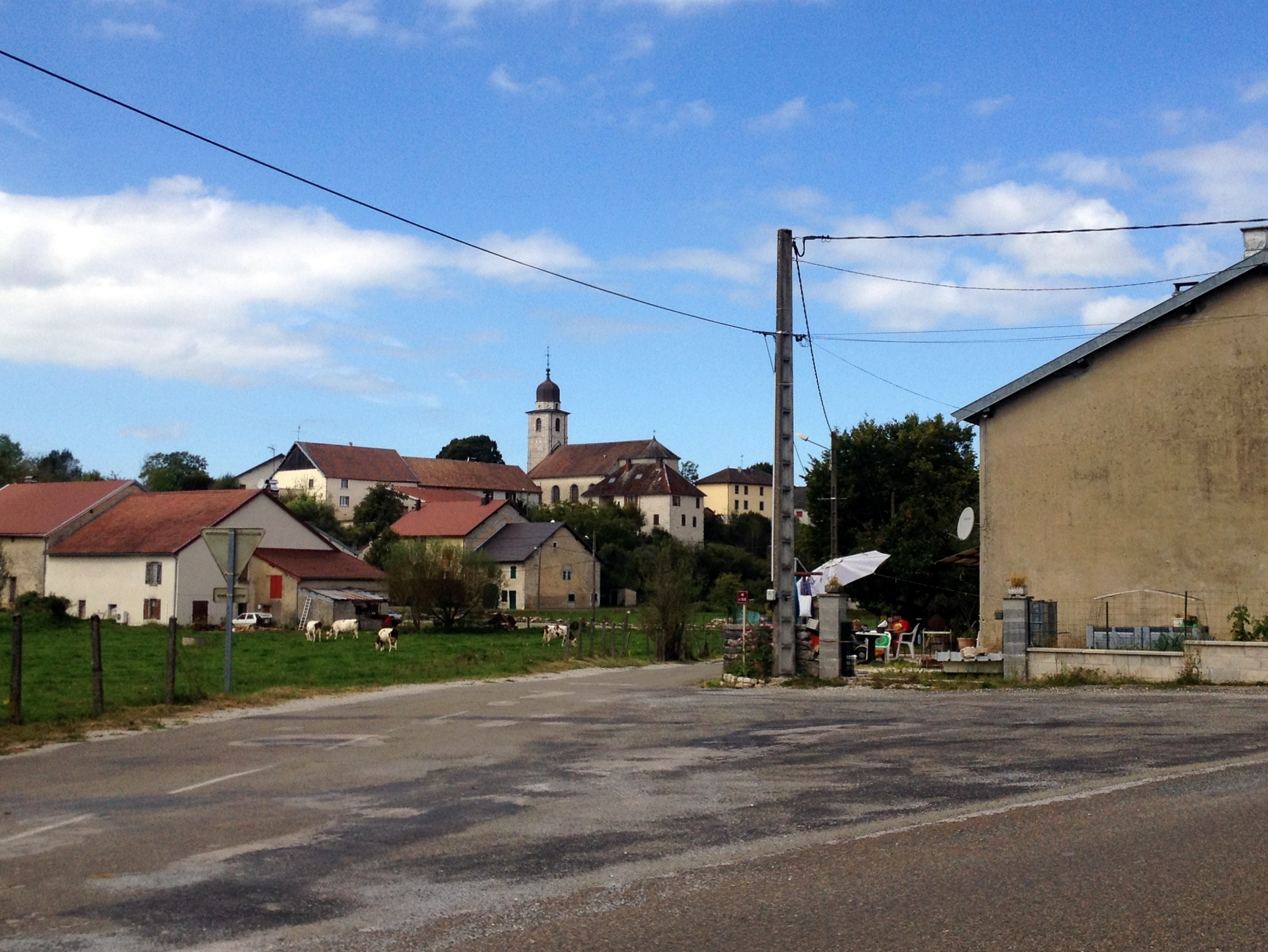
- A general view of Soucia
- Location of Soucia
- Location within France Location within Bourgogne-Franche-Comté
- Coordinates: 46°32′33″N 5°45′00″E
- Country: France
- Region: Bourgogne-Franche-Comté
- Department: Jura
- Arrondissement: Lons-le-Saunier
- Canton: Saint-Laurent-en-Grandvaux

Government
  - Mayor (2020–2026): Philippe Dumont-Girard
- Area^{1}: 12.37 km^{2} (4.78 sq mi)
- Highest elevation: 884 m (2,900 ft)
- Lowest elevation: 484 m (1,588 ft)
- Population (2023): 175
  - Density: 14.1/km^{2} (36.6/sq mi)
- Time zone: UTC+01:00 (CET)
  - Summer (DST): UTC+02:00 (CEST)
- INSEE/Postal code: 39519 /39130
- ^{1} French Land Register data, which excludes lakes, ponds, glaciers > 1 km^{2} (0.386 sq mi or 247 acres) and river estuaries.

Soucia (French pronunciation: [susja]) is a commune in the Jura department in the Bourgogne-Franche-Comté region in eastern France.

== Population ==
Historical population
Year	Pop.	±% p.a.
1968	151	—
1975	129	−2.22%
1982	108	−2.51%
1990	107	−0.12%
1999	113	+0.61%
2007	126	+1.37%
2012	172	+6.42%
2017	187	+1.69%
2023	175	−1.10%
Source: INSEE

== See also ==
- Communes of the Jura department
