= Canton of Saint-Laurent-en-Grandvaux =

Coordinates: 46.58°N 5.96°E

The canton of Saint-Laurent-en-Grandvaux is an administrative division of the Jura department, eastern France. Its borders were modified at the French canton reorganisation which came into effect in March 2015. Its seat is in Saint-Laurent-en-Grandvaux.

It consists of the following communes:

1. Arsure-Arsurette
2. Barésia-sur-l'Ain
3. Bief-des-Maisons
4. Bief-du-Fourg
5. Billecul
6. Boissia
7. Bonlieu
8. Censeau
9. Cerniébaud
10. Les Chalesmes
11. Charcier
12. Charency
13. Charézier
14. La Chaumusse
15. Chaux-des-Crotenay
16. La Chaux-du-Dombief
17. Chevrotaine
18. Clairvaux-les-Lacs
19. Cogna
20. Conte
21. Crans
22. Cuvier
23. Denezières
24. Doucier
25. Doye
26. Entre-deux-Monts
27. Esserval-Tartre
28. La Favière
29. Foncine-le-Bas
30. Foncine-le-Haut
31. Fontenu
32. Fort-du-Plasne
33. Fraroz
34. La Frasnée
35. Le Frasnois
36. Gillois
37. Grande-Rivière Château
38. Hautecour
39. Lac-des-Rouges-Truites
40. Largillay-Marsonnay
41. La Latette
42. Longcochon
43. Marigny
44. Menétrux-en-Joux
45. Mesnois
46. Mièges
47. Mignovillard
48. Mournans-Charbonny
49. Nozeroy
50. Onglières
51. Patornay
52. Les Planches-en-Montagne
53. Plénise
54. Plénisette
55. Pont-de-Poitte
56. Rix
57. Saffloz
58. Saint-Laurent-en-Grandvaux
59. Saint-Maurice-Crillat
60. Saint-Pierre
61. Saugeot
62. Songeson
63. Soucia
64. Thoiria
65. Uxelles
66. Vertamboz
