= Thoiria =

- Commune
- Location of Thoiria
- Location within France Location within Bourgogne-Franche-Comté
- Coordinates: 46°32′04″N 5°44′14″E
- Country: France
- Region: Bourgogne-Franche-Comté
- Department: Jura
- Arrondissement: Lons-le-Saunier
- Canton: Saint-Laurent-en-Grandvaux

Government
  - Mayor (2020–2026): Frank Steyaert
- Area^{1}: 12.24 km^{2} (4.73 sq mi)
- Highest elevation: 873 m (2,864 ft)
- Lowest elevation: 430 m (1,410 ft)
- Population (2023): 183
  - Density: 15.0/km^{2} (38.7/sq mi)
- Time zone: UTC+01:00 (CET)
  - Summer (DST): UTC+02:00 (CEST)
- INSEE/Postal code: 39531 /39130
- ^{1} French Land Register data, which excludes lakes, ponds, glaciers > 1 km^{2} (0.386 sq mi or 247 acres) and river estuaries.

Thoiria (French pronunciation: [twaʁja]) is a commune in the Jura department in the Bourgogne-Franche-Comté region in eastern France.

== Population ==
Historical population
Year	Pop.	±% p.a.
1968	158	—
1975	156	−0.18%
1982	130	−2.57%
1990	148	+1.63%
1999	150	+0.15%
2007	159	+0.73%
2012	185	+3.08%
2017	192	+0.75%
2023	183	−0.80%
Source: INSEE

== See also ==
- Communes of the Jura department
