= Les Chalesmes =

Commune in Bourgogne-Franche-Comté, France

- Commune
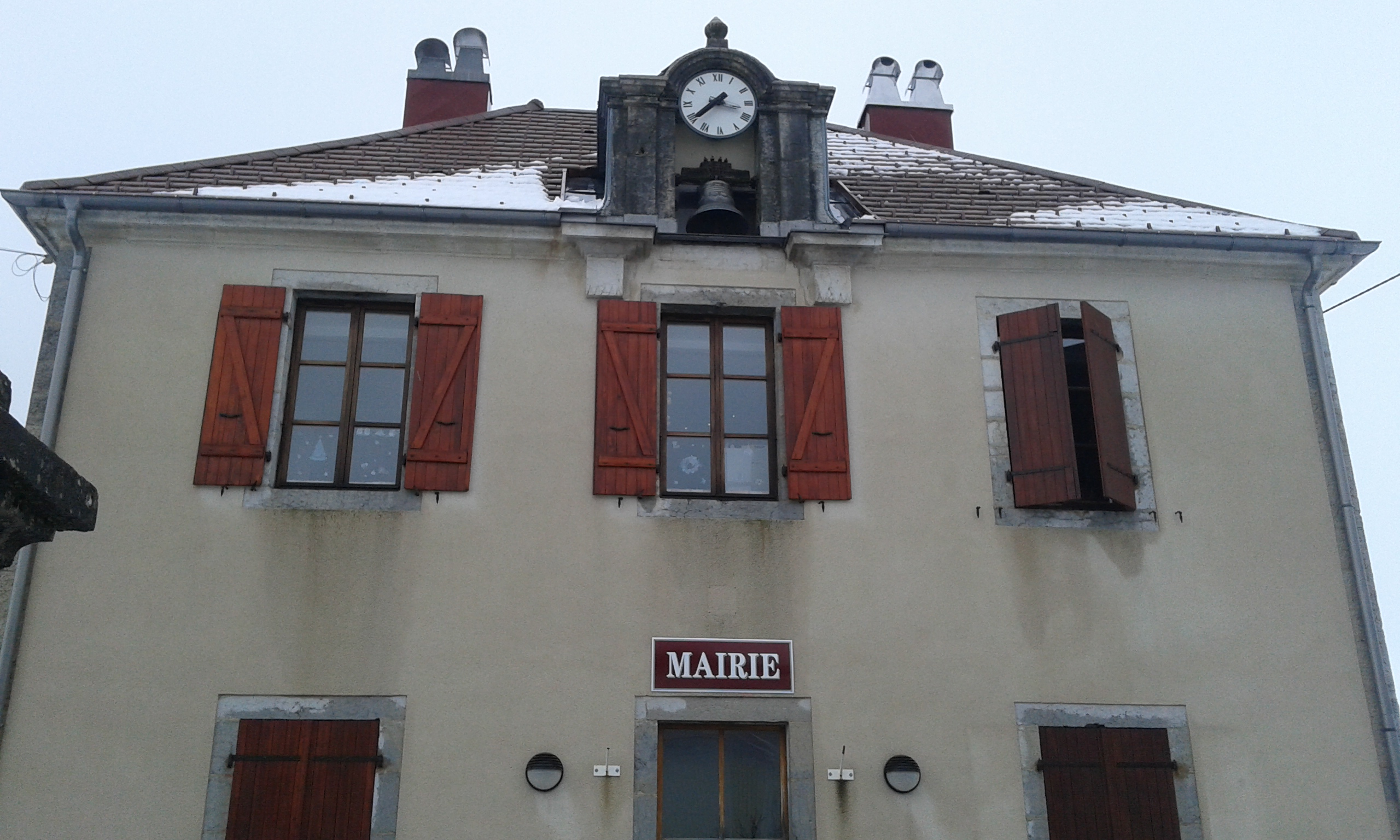
- The town hall in Les Chalesmes
- Location of Les Chalesmes
- Location within France Location within Bourgogne-Franche-Comté
- Coordinates: 46°41′25″N 6°02′18″E
- Country: France
- Region: Bourgogne-Franche-Comté
- Department: Jura
- Arrondissement: Lons-le-Saunier
- Canton: Saint-Laurent-en-Grandvaux

Government
  - Mayor (2020–2026): Laurent Berthet-Tissot
- Area^{1}: 9.47 km^{2} (3.66 sq mi)
- Highest elevation: 1,113 m (3,652 ft)
- Lowest elevation: 800 m (2,600 ft)
- Population (2023): 80
  - Density: 8.4/km^{2} (22/sq mi)
- Time zone: UTC+01:00 (CET)
  - Summer (DST): UTC+02:00 (CEST)
- INSEE/Postal code: 39091 /39150
- ^{1} French Land Register data, which excludes lakes, ponds, glaciers > 1 km^{2} (0.386 sq mi or 247 acres) and river estuaries.

Les Chalesmes (French pronunciation: [le ʃalɛm]) is a commune in the Jura department in Bourgogne-Franche-Comté in eastern France.

== Population ==
Historical population
Year	Pop.	±% p.a.
1968	116	—
1975	96	−2.67%
1982	88	−1.24%
1990	78	−1.50%
1999	90	+1.60%
2007	85	−0.71%
2012	103	+3.92%
2017	96	−1.40%
2023	80	−2.99%
Source: INSEE

== See also ==
- Communes of the Jura department
