= Chevrotaine =

Commune in Bourgogne-Franche-Comté, France

Chevrotaine Tsevroutaina (Arpitan)
- Commune
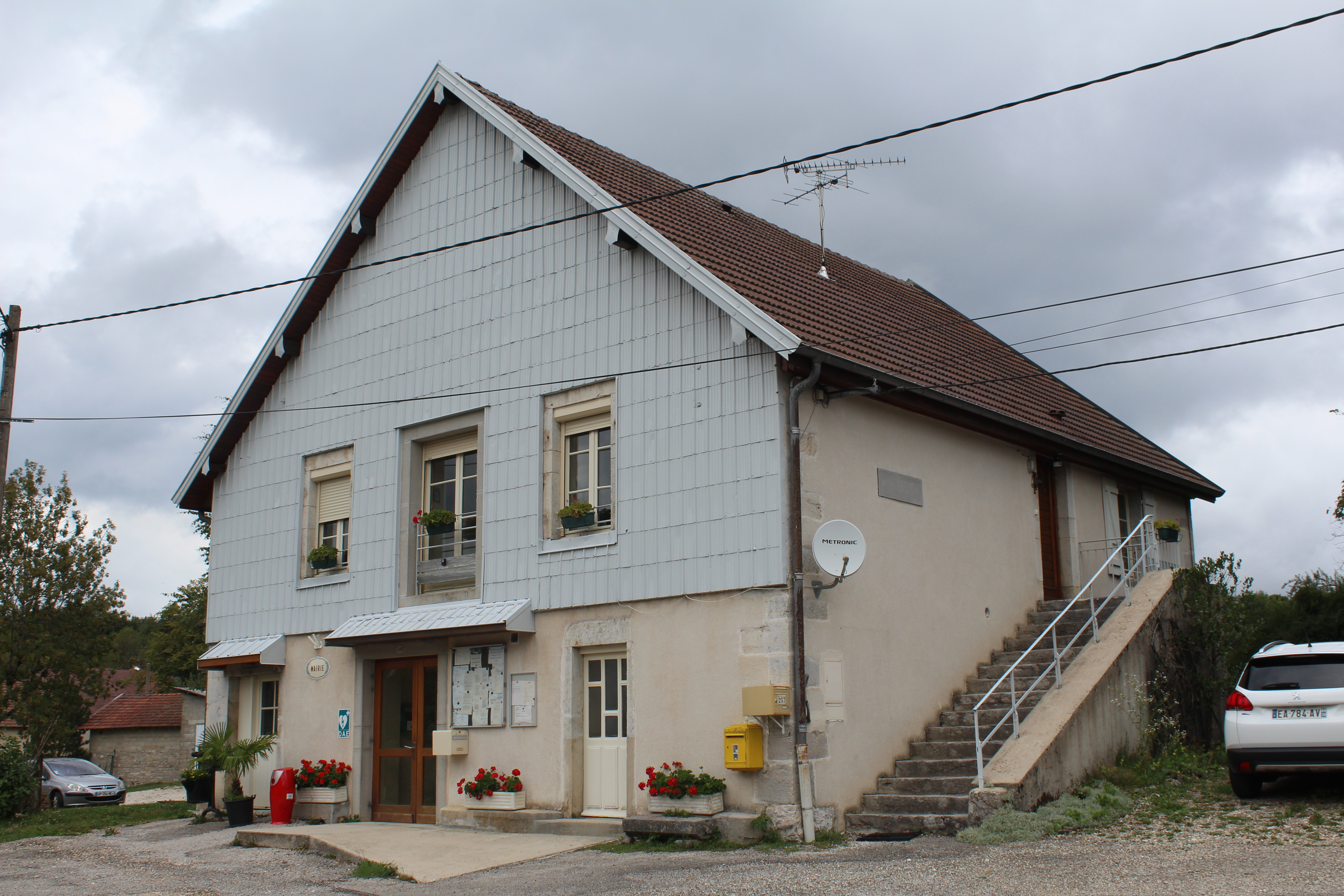
- The town hall in Chevrotaine
- Location of Chevrotaine
- Location within France Location within Bourgogne-Franche-Comté
- Coordinates: 46°39′28″N 5°51′13″E
- Country: France
- Region: Bourgogne-Franche-Comté
- Department: Jura
- Arrondissement: Lons-le-Saunier
- Canton: Saint-Laurent-en-Grandvaux

Government
  - Mayor (2020–2026): Christophe Catilaz
- Area^{1}: 5.33 km^{2} (2.06 sq mi)
- Highest elevation: 811 m (2,661 ft)
- Lowest elevation: 620 m (2,030 ft)
- Population (2023): 34
  - Density: 6.4/km^{2} (17/sq mi)
- Time zone: UTC+01:00 (CET)
  - Summer (DST): UTC+02:00 (CEST)
- INSEE/Postal code: 39143 /39130
- ^{1} French Land Register data, which excludes lakes, ponds, glaciers > 1 km^{2} (0.386 sq mi or 247 acres) and river estuaries.

Chevrotaine (French pronunciation: [ʃəvʁɔtɛn]; Arpitan: Tsevroutaina) is a commune in the Jura department in Bourgogne-Franche-Comté in eastern France.

== Population ==
Historical population
Year	Pop.	±% p.a.
1968	23	—
1975	18	−3.44%
1982	22	+2.91%
1990	25	+1.61%
1999	31	+2.42%
2007	33	+0.78%
2012	37	+2.31%
2017	32	−2.86%
2023	34	+1.02%
Source: INSEE

== See also ==
- Communes of the Jura department
