= Charcier =

Commune in Bourgogne-Franche-Comté, France

- Commune
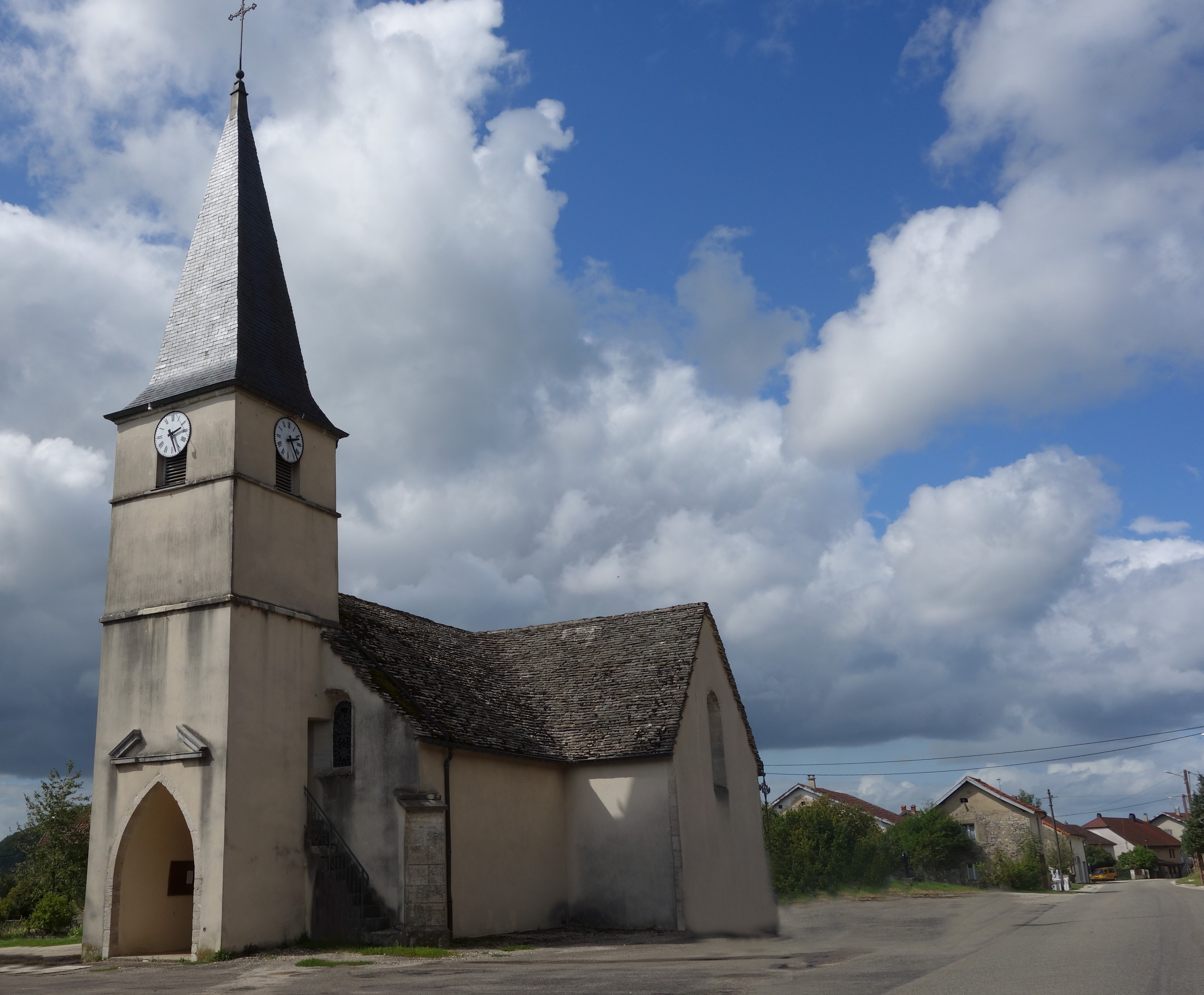
- The church in Charcier
- Location of Charcier
- Location within France Location within Bourgogne-Franche-Comté
- Coordinates: 46°37′41″N 5°45′05″E
- Country: France
- Region: Bourgogne-Franche-Comté
- Department: Jura
- Arrondissement: Lons-le-Saunier
- Canton: Saint-Laurent-en-Grandvaux

Government
  - Mayor (2020–2026): Alain Morel
- Area^{1}: 12.91 km^{2} (4.98 sq mi)
- Highest elevation: 654 m (2,146 ft)
- Lowest elevation: 448 m (1,470 ft)
- Population (2023): 136
  - Density: 10.5/km^{2} (27.3/sq mi)
- Time zone: UTC+01:00 (CET)
  - Summer (DST): UTC+02:00 (CEST)
- INSEE/Postal code: 39107 /39130
- ^{1} French Land Register data, which excludes lakes, ponds, glaciers > 1 km^{2} (0.386 sq mi or 247 acres) and river estuaries.

Charcier (French pronunciation: [ʃaʁsje]) is a commune in the Jura department in Bourgogne-Franche-Comté in eastern France.

== Population ==
Historical population
Year	Pop.	±% p.a.
1968	113	—
1975	102	−1.45%
1982	92	−1.46%
1990	112	+2.49%
1999	107	−0.51%
2007	117	+1.12%
2012	119	+0.34%
2017	129	+1.63%
2023	136	+0.88%
Source: INSEE

== See also ==
- Communes of the Jura department
