= Arsure-Arsurette =

Commune in Bourgogne-Franche-Comté, France

- Commune
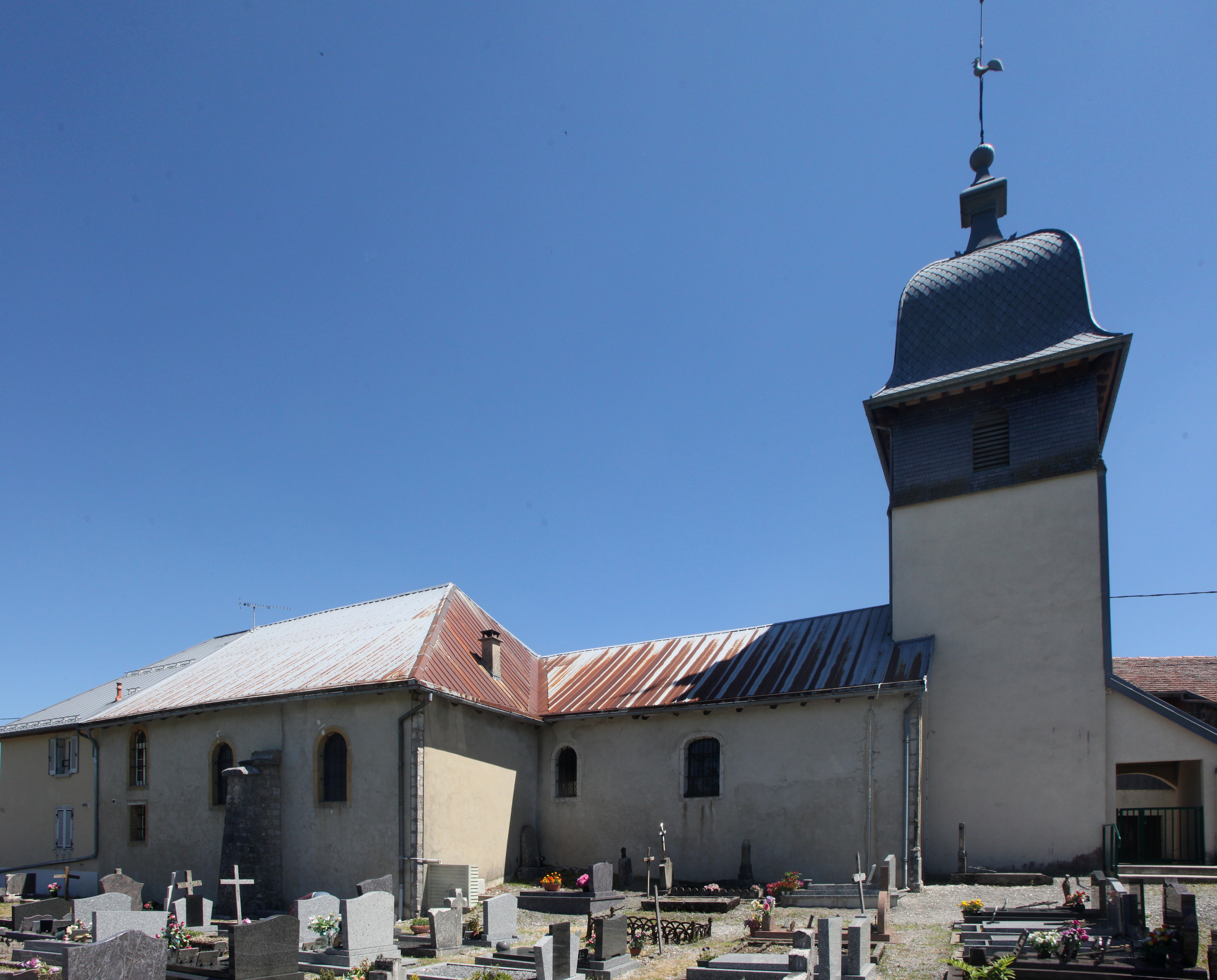
- The church in Arsure-Arsurette
- Location of Arsure-Arsurette
- Location within France Location within Bourgogne-Franche-Comté
- Coordinates: 46°43′24″N 6°05′00″E
- Country: France
- Region: Bourgogne-Franche-Comté
- Department: Jura
- Arrondissement: Lons-le-Saunier
- Canton: Saint-Laurent-en-Grandvaux

Government
  - Mayor (2020–2026): Catherine Rousset
- Area^{1}: 12.56 km^{2} (4.85 sq mi)
- Highest elevation: 1,205 m (3,953 ft)
- Lowest elevation: 875 m (2,871 ft)
- Population (2023): 100
  - Density: 8.0/km^{2} (21/sq mi)
- Time zone: UTC+01:00 (CET)
  - Summer (DST): UTC+02:00 (CEST)
- INSEE/Postal code: 39020 /39250
- ^{1} French Land Register data, which excludes lakes, ponds, glaciers > 1 km^{2} (0.386 sq mi or 247 acres) and river estuaries.

Arsure-Arsurette (French pronunciation: [aʁsyʁ aʁsyʁɛt]) is a commune in the Jura department in the region of Bourgogne-Franche-Comté in eastern France.

Its church has a choir dating from the 11th century.

== Population ==
Historical population
Year	Pop.	±% p.a.
1968	148	—
1975	127	−2.16%
1982	110	−2.03%
1990	99	−1.31%
1999	87	−1.43%
2007	89	+0.28%
2012	92	+0.67%
2017	101	+1.88%
2023	100	−0.17%
Source: INSEE

== See also ==
- Communes of the Jura department
