= Menétrux-en-Joux =

Commune in Bourgogne-Franche-Comté, France

- Commune
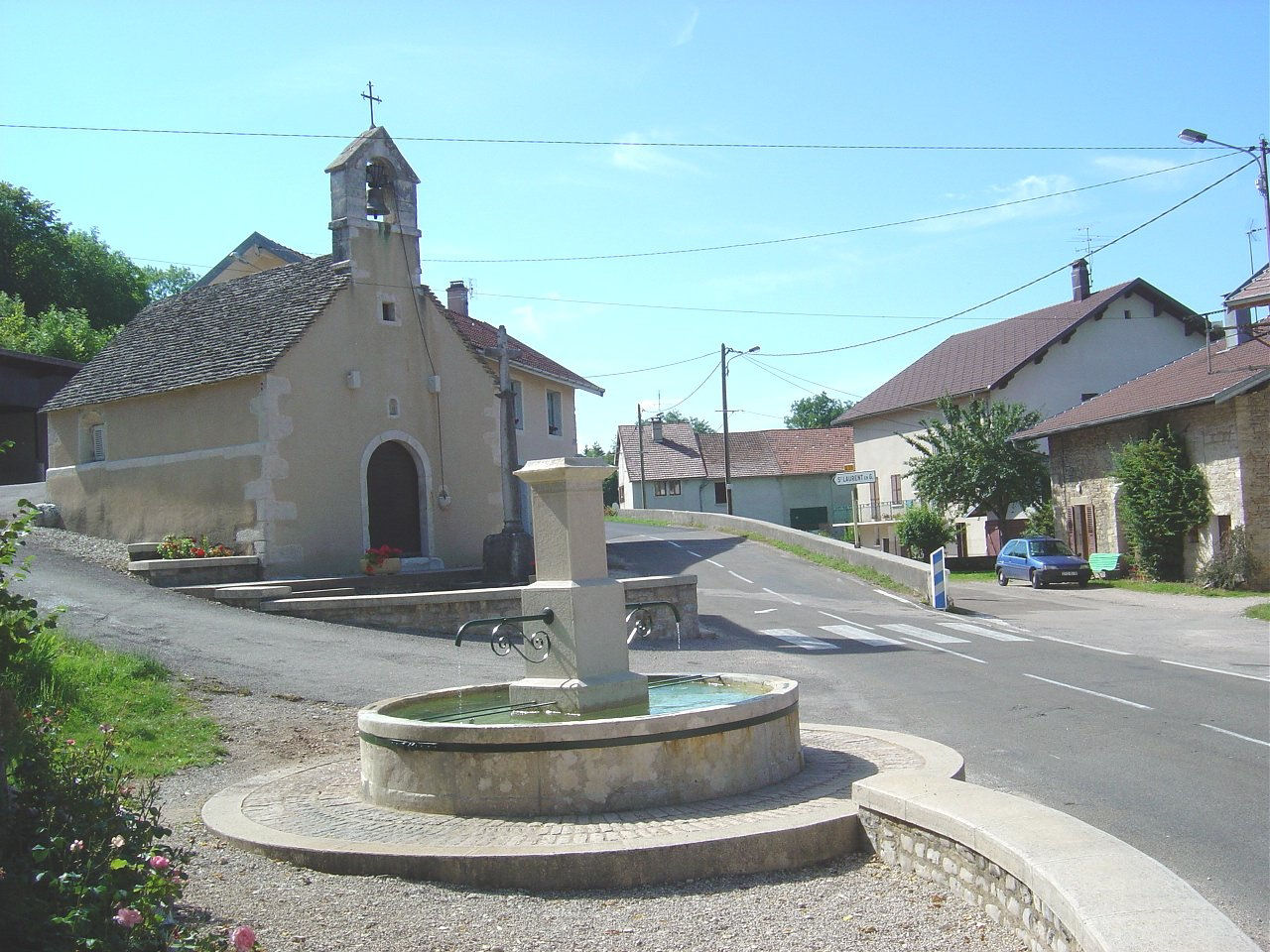
- Place Lacuzon, the fountain and the chapel (1664)

- Coat of arms
- Location of Menétrux-en-Joux
- Location within France Location within Bourgogne-Franche-Comté
- Coordinates: 46°37′30″N 5°49′46″E
- Country: France
- Region: Bourgogne-Franche-Comté
- Department: Jura
- Arrondissement: Lons-le-Saunier
- Canton: Saint-Laurent-en-Grandvaux

Government
  - Mayor (2020–2026): Anne Dufour
- Area^{1}: 8.78 km^{2} (3.39 sq mi)
- Highest elevation: 819 m (2,687 ft)
- Lowest elevation: 502 m (1,647 ft)
- Population (2023): 76
  - Density: 8.7/km^{2} (22/sq mi)
- Time zone: UTC+01:00 (CET)
  - Summer (DST): UTC+02:00 (CEST)
- INSEE/Postal code: 39322 /39130
- ^{1} French Land Register data, which excludes lakes, ponds, glaciers > 1 km^{2} (0.386 sq mi or 247 acres) and river estuaries.

Menétrux-en-Joux (French pronunciation: [menetʁy ɑ̃ ʒu]; also Ménétrux-en-Joux) is a commune in the Jura department in Bourgogne-Franche-Comté in eastern France.

== Population ==
Historical population
| Year | Pop. | ±% p.a. |
|---|---|---|
| 1968 | 76 | — |
| 1975 | 73 | −0.57% |
| 1982 | 43 | −7.28% |
| 1990 | 38 | −1.53% |
| 1999 | 47 | +2.39% |
| 2007 | 46 | −0.27% |
| 2012 | 61 | +5.81% |
| 2017 | 56 | −1.70% |
| 2023 | 76 | +5.22% |
Source: INSEE

== See also ==
- Communes of the Jura department
