= Plénise =

Commune in Bourgogne-Franche-Comté, France

- Commune
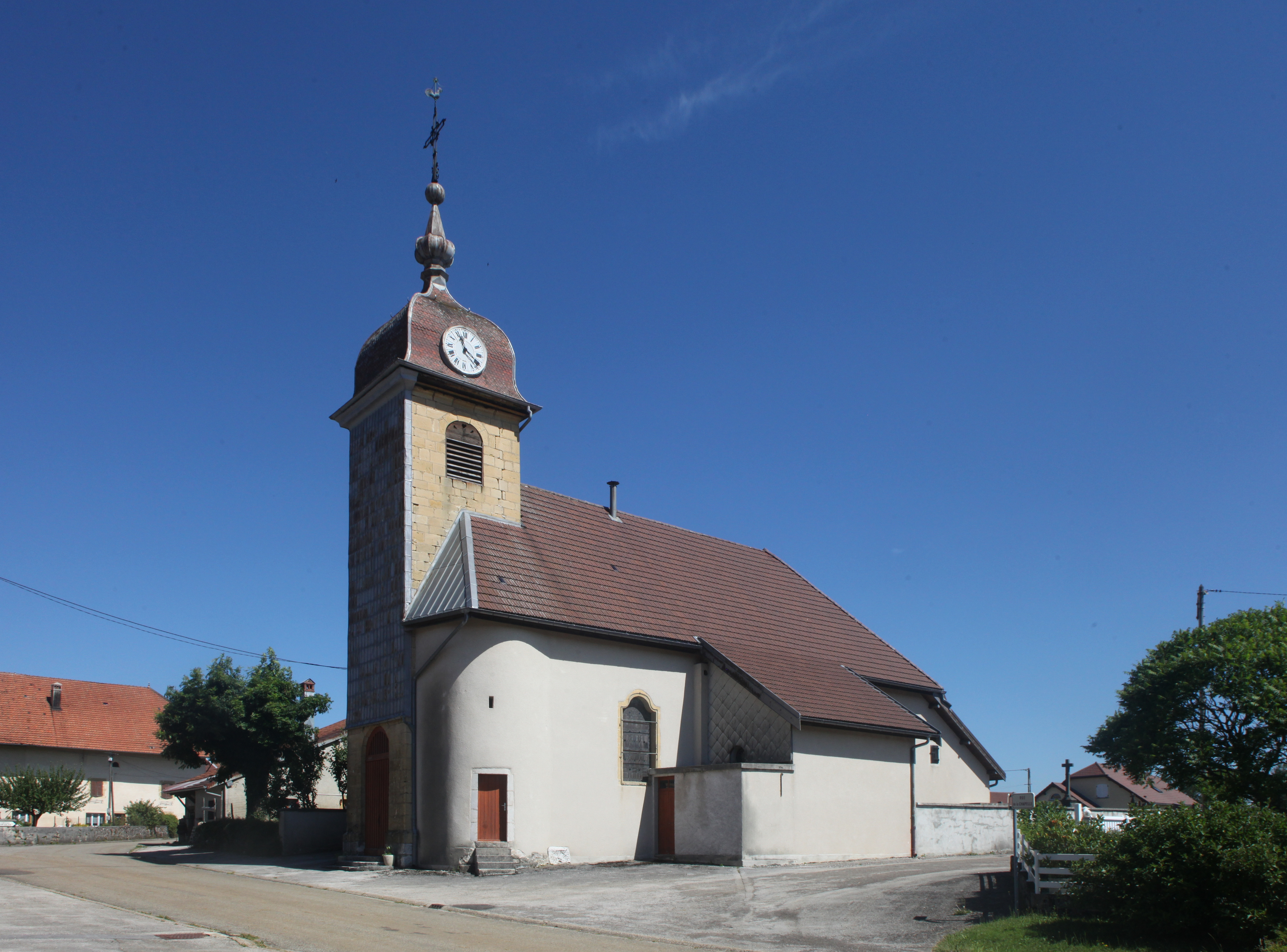
- The church in Plénise
- Location of Plénise
- Location within France Location within Bourgogne-Franche-Comté
- Coordinates: 46°48′25″N 6°01′49″E
- Country: France
- Region: Bourgogne-Franche-Comté
- Department: Jura
- Arrondissement: Lons-le-Saunier
- Canton: Saint-Laurent-en-Grandvaux

Government
  - Mayor (2020–2026): Yves Lacroix
- Area^{1}: 5.43 km^{2} (2.10 sq mi)
- Highest elevation: 907 m (2,976 ft)
- Lowest elevation: 733 m (2,405 ft)
- Population (2023): 64
  - Density: 12/km^{2} (31/sq mi)
- Time zone: UTC+01:00 (CET)
  - Summer (DST): UTC+02:00 (CEST)
- INSEE/Postal code: 39427 /39250
- ^{1} French Land Register data, which excludes lakes, ponds, glaciers > 1 km^{2} (0.386 sq mi or 247 acres) and river estuaries.

Plénise (French pronunciation: [pleniz]) is a commune in the Jura department in Bourgogne-Franche-Comté in eastern France.

== Population ==
Historical population
Year	Pop.	±% p.a.
1968	87	—
1975	68	−3.46%
1982	54	−3.24%
1990	55	+0.23%
1999	63	+1.52%
2007	53	−2.14%
2012	59	+2.17%
2017	62	+1.00%
2023	64	+0.53%
Source: INSEE

== See also ==
- Communes of the Jura department
