= Billecul =

Commune in Bourgogne-Franche-Comté, France

- Commune
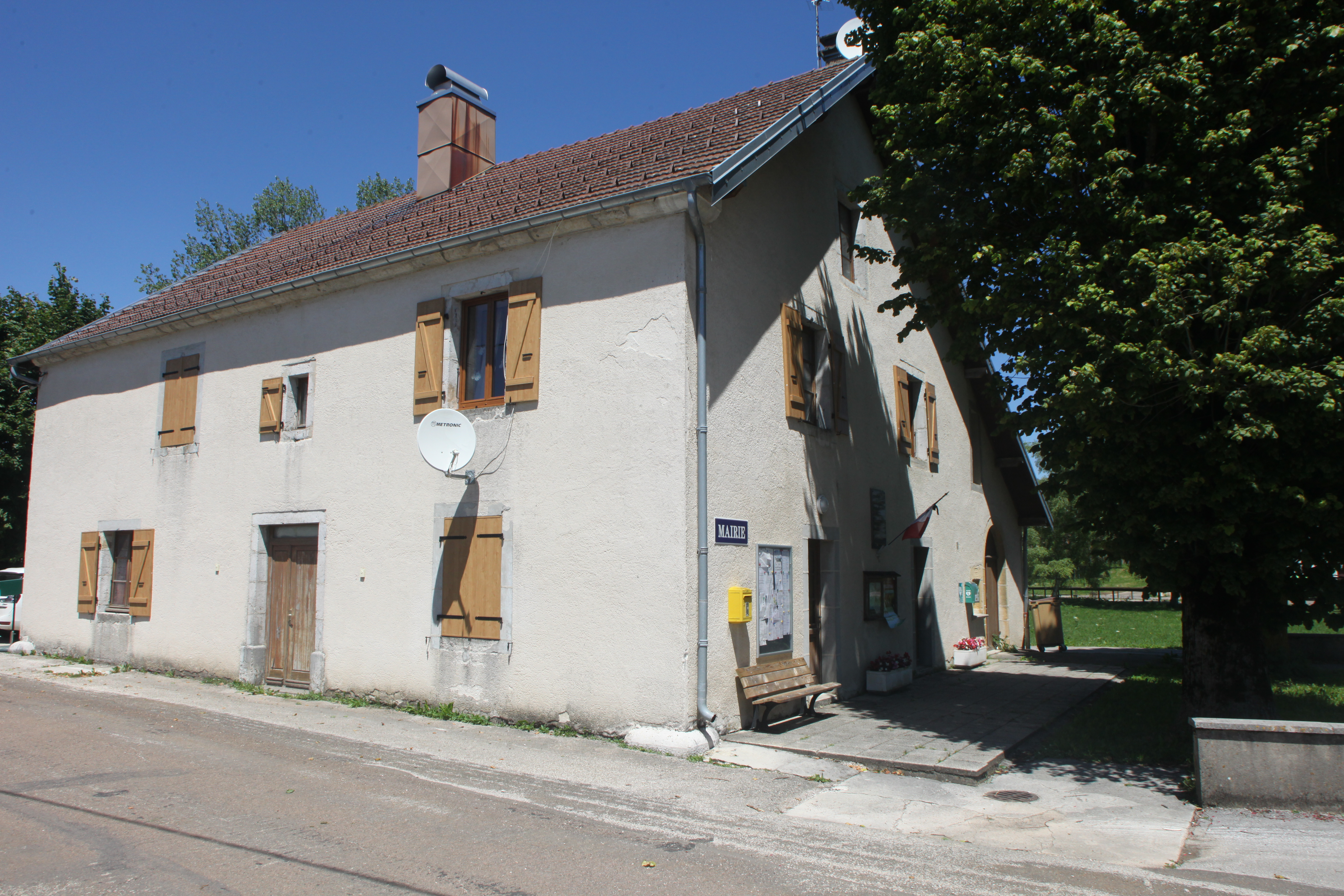
- The town hall in Billecul
- Location of Billecul
- Location within France Location within Bourgogne-Franche-Comté
- Coordinates: 46°45′23″N 6°03′06″E
- Country: France
- Region: Bourgogne-Franche-Comté
- Department: Jura
- Arrondissement: Lons-le-Saunier
- Canton: Saint-Laurent-en-Grandvaux

Government
  - Mayor (2020–2026): Gérald Courvoisier
- Area^{1}: 4.41 km^{2} (1.70 sq mi)
- Highest elevation: 926 m (3,038 ft)
- Lowest elevation: 780 m (2,560 ft)
- Population (2023): 60
  - Density: 14/km^{2} (35/sq mi)
- Time zone: UTC+01:00 (CET)
  - Summer (DST): UTC+02:00 (CEST)
- INSEE/Postal code: 39055 /39250
- ^{1} French Land Register data, which excludes lakes, ponds, glaciers > 1 km^{2} (0.386 sq mi or 247 acres) and river estuaries.

Billecul (Arpitan: Beuilcul) is a commune in the Jura department in Bourgogne-Franche-Comté in eastern France.

== Population ==
Historical population
Year	Pop.	±% p.a.
1968	64	—
1975	68	+0.87%
1982	61	−1.54%
1990	44	−4.00%
1999	32	−3.48%
2007	30	−0.80%
2012	39	+5.39%
2017	47	+3.80%
2023	60	+4.15%
Source: INSEE

== See also ==
- Communes of the Jura department
