= Cogna =

Commune in Bourgogne-Franche-Comté, France

- Commune
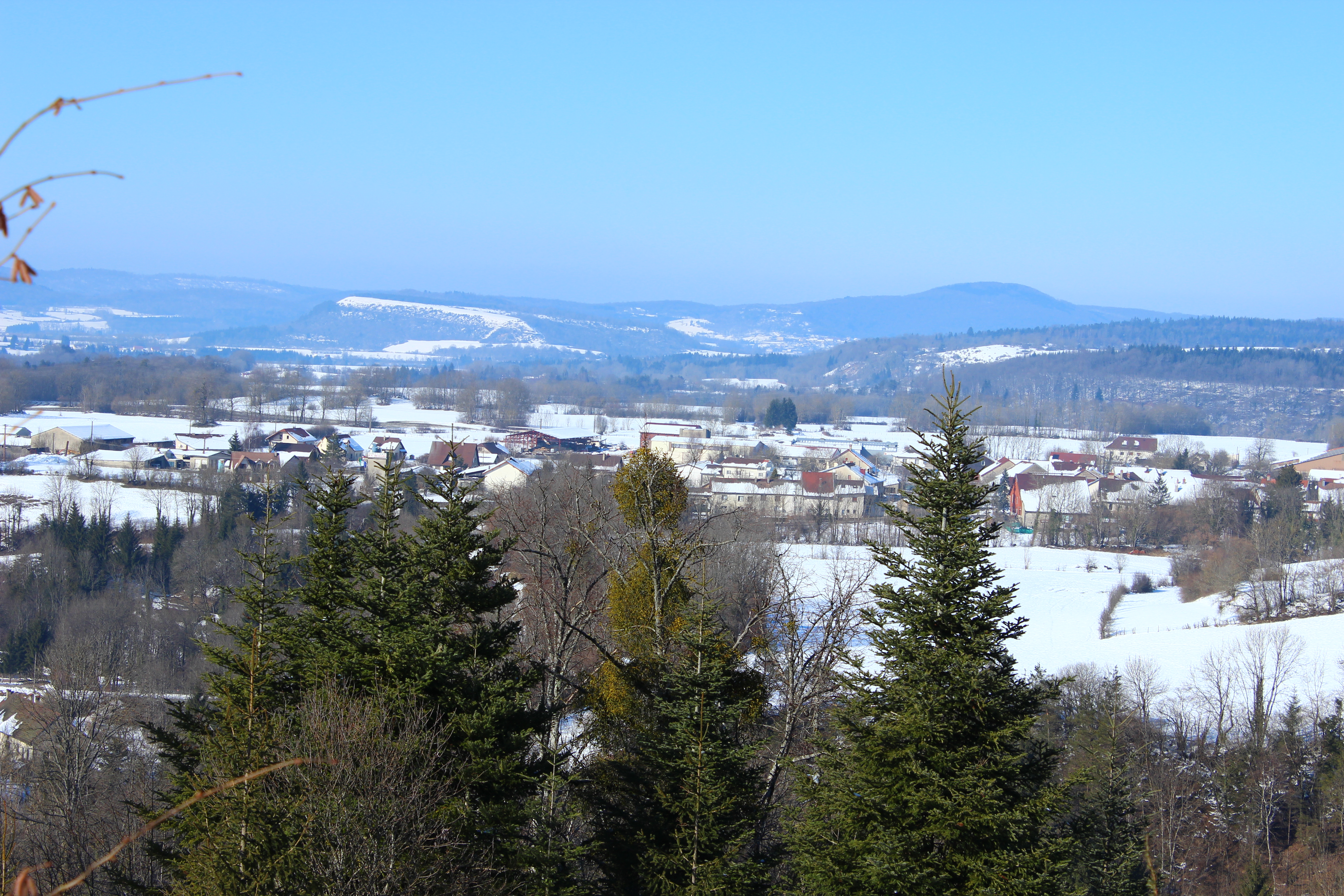
- A general view of Cogna
- Location of Cogna
- Location within France Location within Bourgogne-Franche-Comté
- Coordinates: 46°34′54″N 5°45′31″E
- Country: France
- Region: Bourgogne-Franche-Comté
- Department: Jura
- Arrondissement: Lons-le-Saunier
- Canton: Saint-Laurent-en-Grandvaux
- Intercommunality: Terre d'Émeraude Communauté

Government
  - Mayor (2020–2026): Jean-Claude Maillard
- Area^{1}: 6.60 km^{2} (2.55 sq mi)
- Highest elevation: 700 m (2,300 ft)
- Lowest elevation: 498 m (1,634 ft)
- Population (2023): 234
  - Density: 35.5/km^{2} (91.8/sq mi)
- Time zone: UTC+01:00 (CET)
  - Summer (DST): UTC+02:00 (CEST)
- INSEE/Postal code: 39156 /39130
- ^{1} French Land Register data, which excludes lakes, ponds, glaciers > 1 km^{2} (0.386 sq mi or 247 acres) and river estuaries.

Cogna (French pronunciation: [kɔɲa]) is a commune in the Jura department and Bourgogne-Franche-Comté region of eastern France.

== Population ==
Historical population
Year	Pop.	±% p.a.
1968	199	—
1975	226	+1.83%
1982	216	−0.64%
1990	216	+0.00%
1999	212	−0.21%
2007	247	+1.93%
2012	260	+1.03%
2017	252	−0.62%
2023	234	−1.23%
Source: INSEE

== See also ==
- Communes of the Jura department
