= Songeson =

- Commune
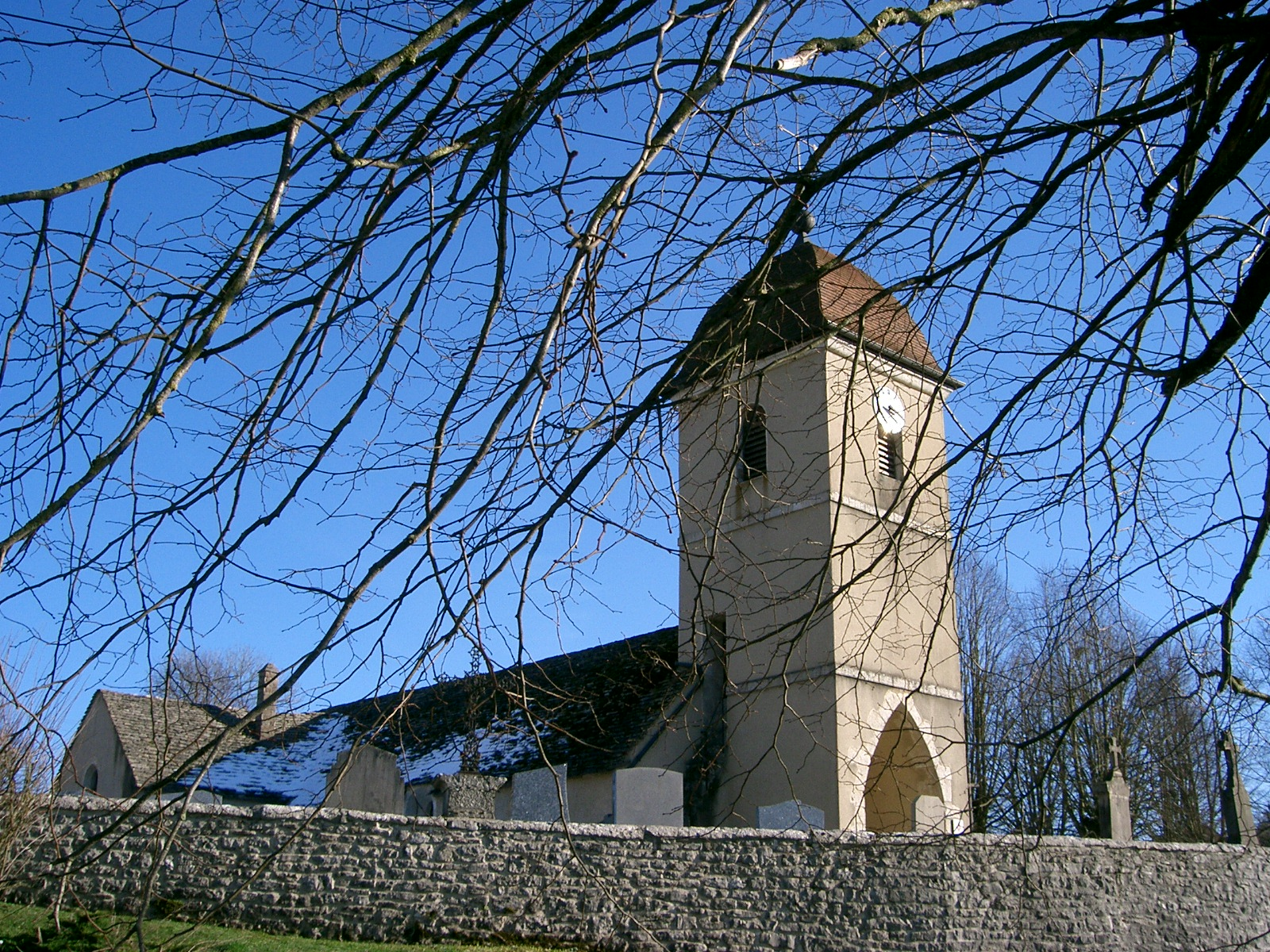
- The church in Songeson
- Location of Songeson
- Location within France Location within Bourgogne-Franche-Comté
- Coordinates: 46°39′06″N 5°49′16″E
- Country: France
- Region: Bourgogne-Franche-Comté
- Department: Jura
- Arrondissement: Lons-le-Saunier
- Canton: Saint-Laurent-en-Grandvaux

Government
  - Mayor (2020–2026): Jean-Luc Cattet
- Area^{1}: 8.42 km^{2} (3.25 sq mi)
- Highest elevation: 832 m (2,730 ft)
- Lowest elevation: 530 m (1,740 ft)
- Population (2023): 71
  - Density: 8.4/km^{2} (22/sq mi)
- Time zone: UTC+01:00 (CET)
  - Summer (DST): UTC+02:00 (CEST)
- INSEE/Postal code: 39518 /39130
- ^{1} French Land Register data, which excludes lakes, ponds, glaciers > 1 km^{2} (0.386 sq mi or 247 acres) and river estuaries.

Songeson is a commune in the Jura department in the Bourgogne-Franche-Comté region in eastern France.

== Population ==
Historical population
Year	Pop.	±% p.a.
1968	101	—
1975	85	−2.43%
1982	66	−3.55%
1990	51	−3.17%
1999	58	+1.44%
2007	71	+2.56%
2012	75	+1.10%
2017	69	−1.65%
2023	71	+0.48%
Source: INSEE

== See also ==
- Communes of the Jura department
