= Mournans-Charbonny =

Commune in Bourgogne-Franche-Comté, France

- Commune
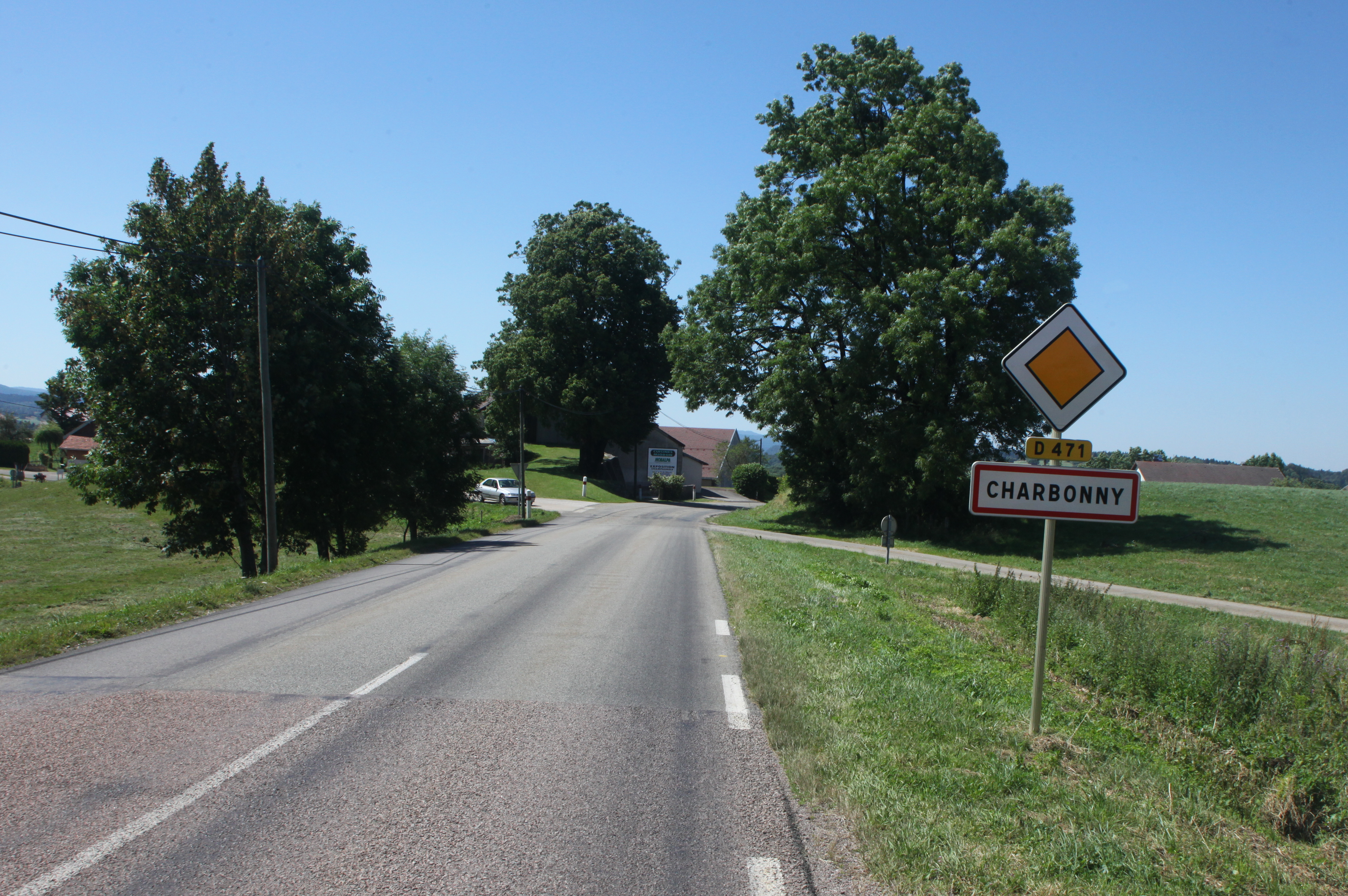
- The road into Charbonny
- Location of Mournans-Charbonny
- Location within France Location within Bourgogne-Franche-Comté
- Coordinates: 46°46′51″N 6°00′18″E
- Country: France
- Region: Bourgogne-Franche-Comté
- Department: Jura
- Arrondissement: Lons-le-Saunier
- Canton: Saint-Laurent-en-Grandvaux

Government
  - Mayor (2020–2026): Laurence Moutenet
- Area^{1}: 5.06 km^{2} (1.95 sq mi)
- Highest elevation: 836 m (2,743 ft)
- Lowest elevation: 636 m (2,087 ft)
- Population (2023): 79
  - Density: 16/km^{2} (40/sq mi)
- Time zone: UTC+01:00 (CET)
  - Summer (DST): UTC+02:00 (CEST)
- INSEE/Postal code: 39372 /39250
- ^{1} French Land Register data, which excludes lakes, ponds, glaciers > 1 km^{2} (0.386 sq mi or 247 acres) and river estuaries.

Mournans-Charbonny (French pronunciation: [muʁnɑ̃ ʃaʁbɔni]) is a commune in the Jura department in Bourgogne-Franche-Comté in eastern France.

== Population ==
Historical population
Year	Pop.	±% p.a.
1968	64	—
1975	69	+1.08%
1982	80	+2.14%
1990	89	+1.34%
1999	91	+0.25%
2007	85	−0.85%
2012	94	+2.03%
2017	89	−1.09%
2023	79	−1.97%
Source: INSEE

== See also ==
- Communes of the Jura department
