= Saugeot =

- Commune
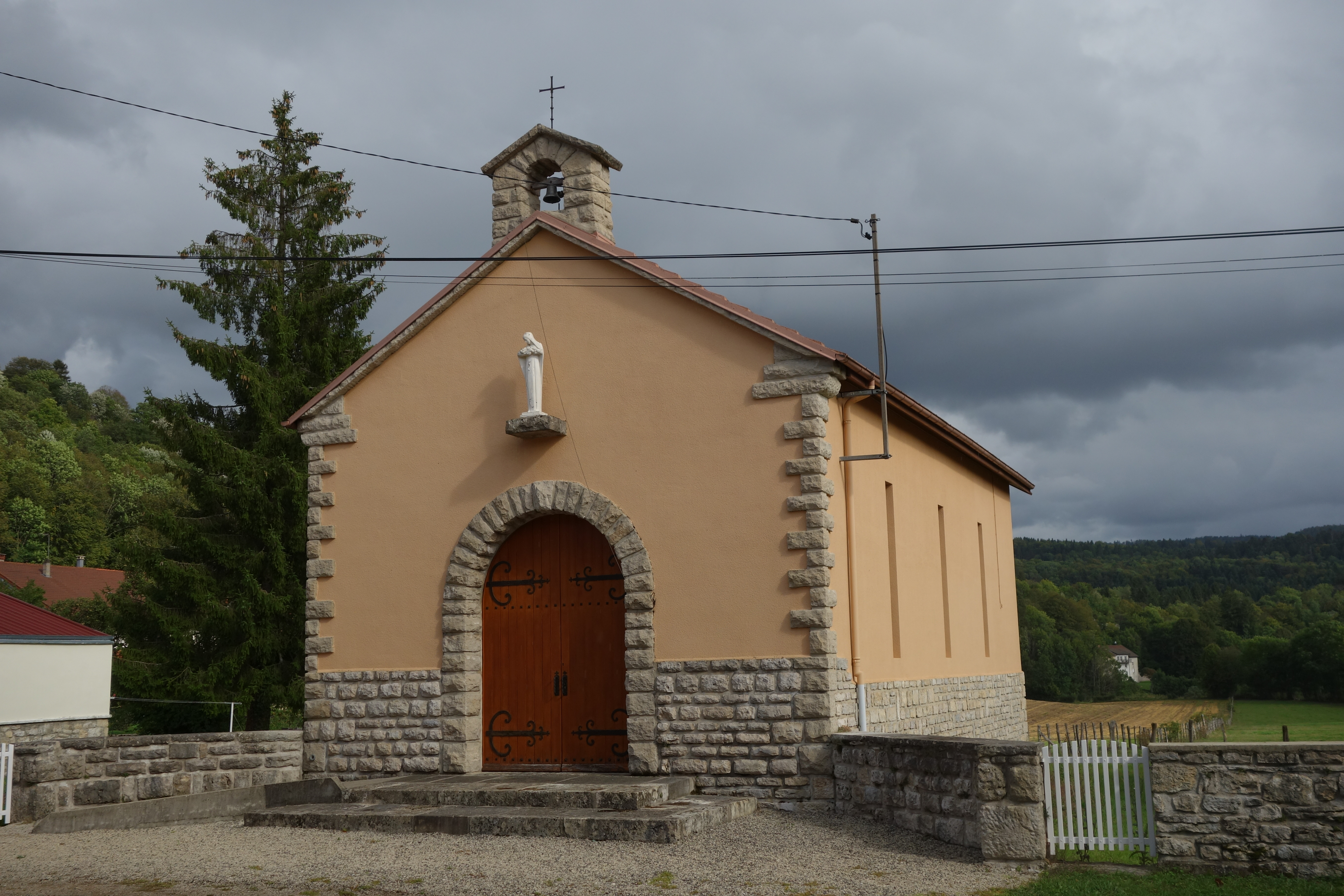
- The chapel in Saugeot
- Location of Saugeot
- Location within France Location within Bourgogne-Franche-Comté
- Coordinates: 46°36′05″N 5°49′45″E
- Country: France
- Region: Bourgogne-Franche-Comté
- Department: Jura
- Arrondissement: Lons-le-Saunier
- Canton: Saint-Laurent-en-Grandvaux

Government
  - Mayor (2020–2026): Michel Millet
- Area^{1}: 4.49 km^{2} (1.73 sq mi)
- Highest elevation: 755 m (2,477 ft)
- Lowest elevation: 600 m (2,000 ft)
- Population (2023): 56
  - Density: 12/km^{2} (32/sq mi)
- Time zone: UTC+01:00 (CET)
  - Summer (DST): UTC+02:00 (CEST)
- INSEE/Postal code: 39505 /39130
- ^{1} French Land Register data, which excludes lakes, ponds, glaciers > 1 km^{2} (0.386 sq mi or 247 acres) and river estuaries.

Saugeot (French pronunciation: [soʒo]) is a commune in the Jura department in the Bourgogne-Franche-Comté region in eastern France.

== Population ==
Historical population
Year	Pop.	±% p.a.
1968	94	—
1975	83	−1.76%
1982	82	−0.17%
1990	71	−1.78%
1999	59	−2.04%
2007	59	+0.00%
2012	48	−4.04%
2017	66	+6.58%
2023	56	−2.70%
Source: INSEE

== See also ==
- Communes of the Jura department
