= Charézier =

Commune in Bourgogne-Franche-Comté, France

- Commune
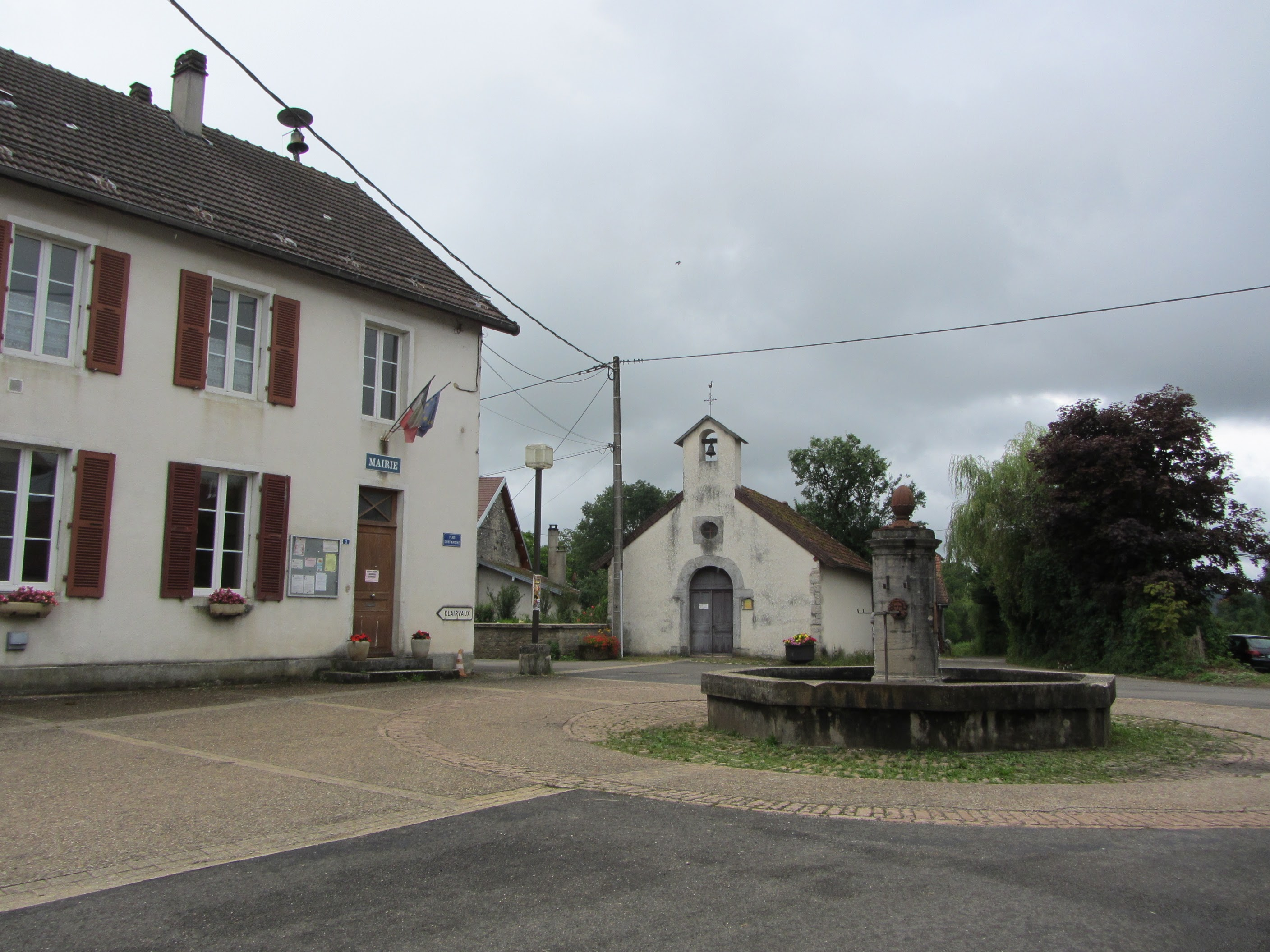
- The town hall in Charézier
- Location of Charézier
- Location within France Location within Bourgogne-Franche-Comté
- Coordinates: 46°36′41″N 5°43′41″E
- Country: France
- Region: Bourgogne-Franche-Comté
- Department: Jura
- Arrondissement: Lons-le-Saunier
- Canton: Saint-Laurent-en-Grandvaux

Government
  - Mayor (2020–2026): Stéphane Bellat
- Area^{1}: 9.26 km^{2} (3.58 sq mi)
- Highest elevation: 609 m (1,998 ft)
- Lowest elevation: 434 m (1,424 ft)
- Population (2023): 166
  - Density: 17.9/km^{2} (46.4/sq mi)
- Time zone: UTC+01:00 (CET)
  - Summer (DST): UTC+02:00 (CEST)
- INSEE/Postal code: 39109 /39130
- ^{1} French Land Register data, which excludes lakes, ponds, glaciers > 1 km^{2} (0.386 sq mi or 247 acres) and river estuaries.

Charézier (French pronunciation: [ʃaʁezje]) is a commune in the Jura department in Bourgogne-Franche-Comté in eastern France.

== Population ==
Historical population
Year	Pop.	±% p.a.
1968	140	—
1975	110	−3.39%
1982	104	−0.80%
1990	116	+1.37%
1999	139	+2.03%
2007	153	+1.21%
2012	150	−0.40%
2017	175	+3.13%
2023	166	−0.88%
Source: INSEE

== See also ==
- Communes of the Jura department
