= Boissia =

Commune in Bourgogne-Franche-Comté, France

- Commune
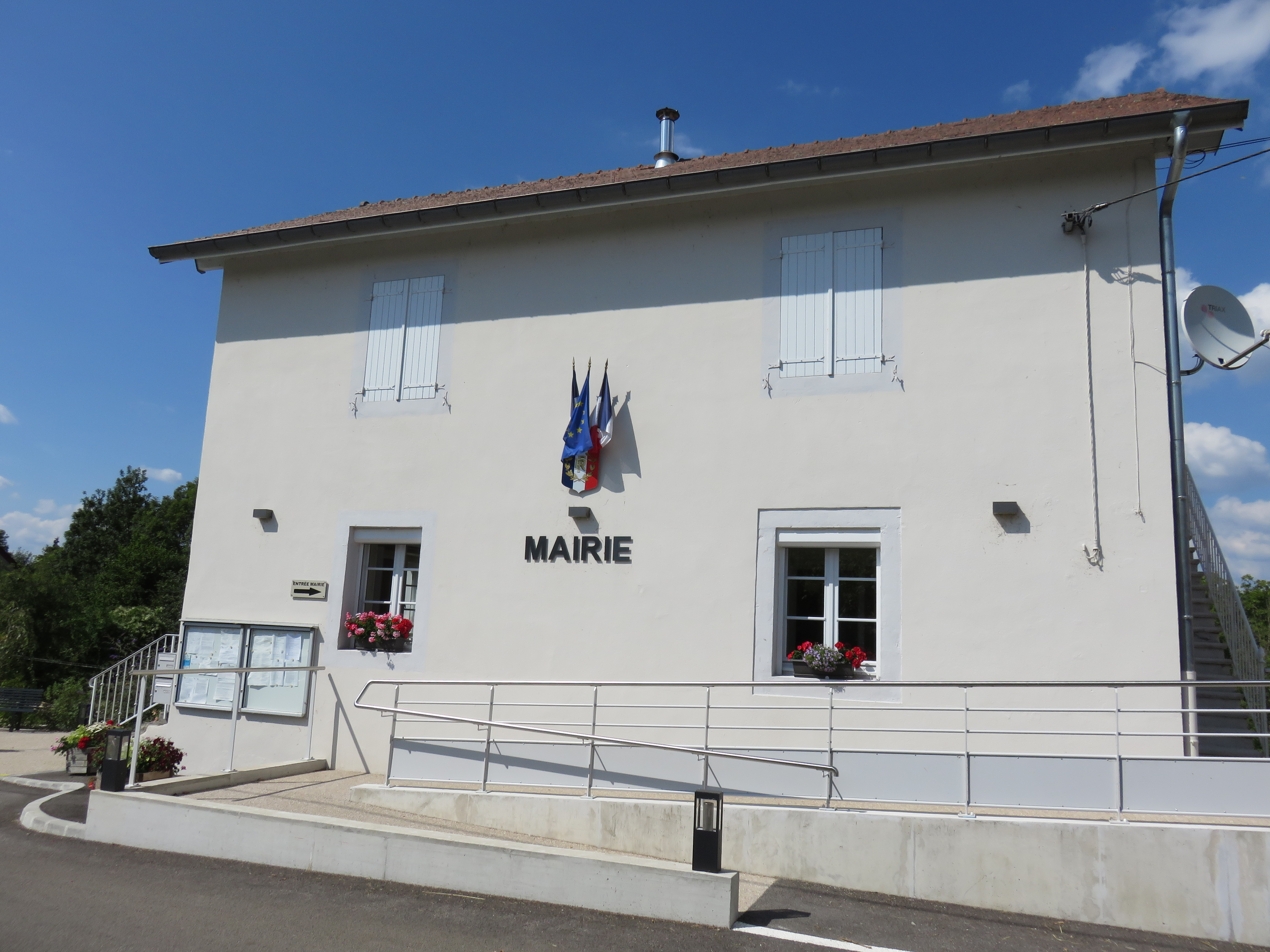
- The town hall in Boissia
- Location of Boissia
- Location within France Location within Bourgogne-Franche-Comté
- Coordinates: 46°35′36″N 5°44′07″E
- Country: France
- Region: Bourgogne-Franche-Comté
- Department: Jura
- Arrondissement: Lons-le-Saunier
- Canton: Saint-Laurent-en-Grandvaux

Government
  - Mayor (2020–2026): Hervé Bailly
- Area^{1}: 5.67 km^{2} (2.19 sq mi)
- Highest elevation: 528 m (1,732 ft)
- Lowest elevation: 426 m (1,398 ft)
- Population (2023): 119
  - Density: 21.0/km^{2} (54.4/sq mi)
- Time zone: UTC+01:00 (CET)
  - Summer (DST): UTC+02:00 (CEST)
- INSEE/Postal code: 39061 /39130
- ^{1} French Land Register data, which excludes lakes, ponds, glaciers > 1 km^{2} (0.386 sq mi or 247 acres) and river estuaries.

Boissia (French pronunciation: [bwasja]) is a commune in the Jura department in Bourgogne-Franche-Comté in eastern France.

== Population ==
Historical population
Year	Pop.	±% p.a.
1968	87	—
1975	88	+0.16%
1982	82	−1.00%
1990	82	+0.00%
1999	104	+2.68%
2007	136	+3.41%
2012	133	−0.45%
2017	118	−2.36%
2023	119	+0.14%
Source: INSEE

== See also ==
- Communes of the Jura department
