= Mesnois =

Commune in Bourgogne-Franche-Comté, France

- Commune
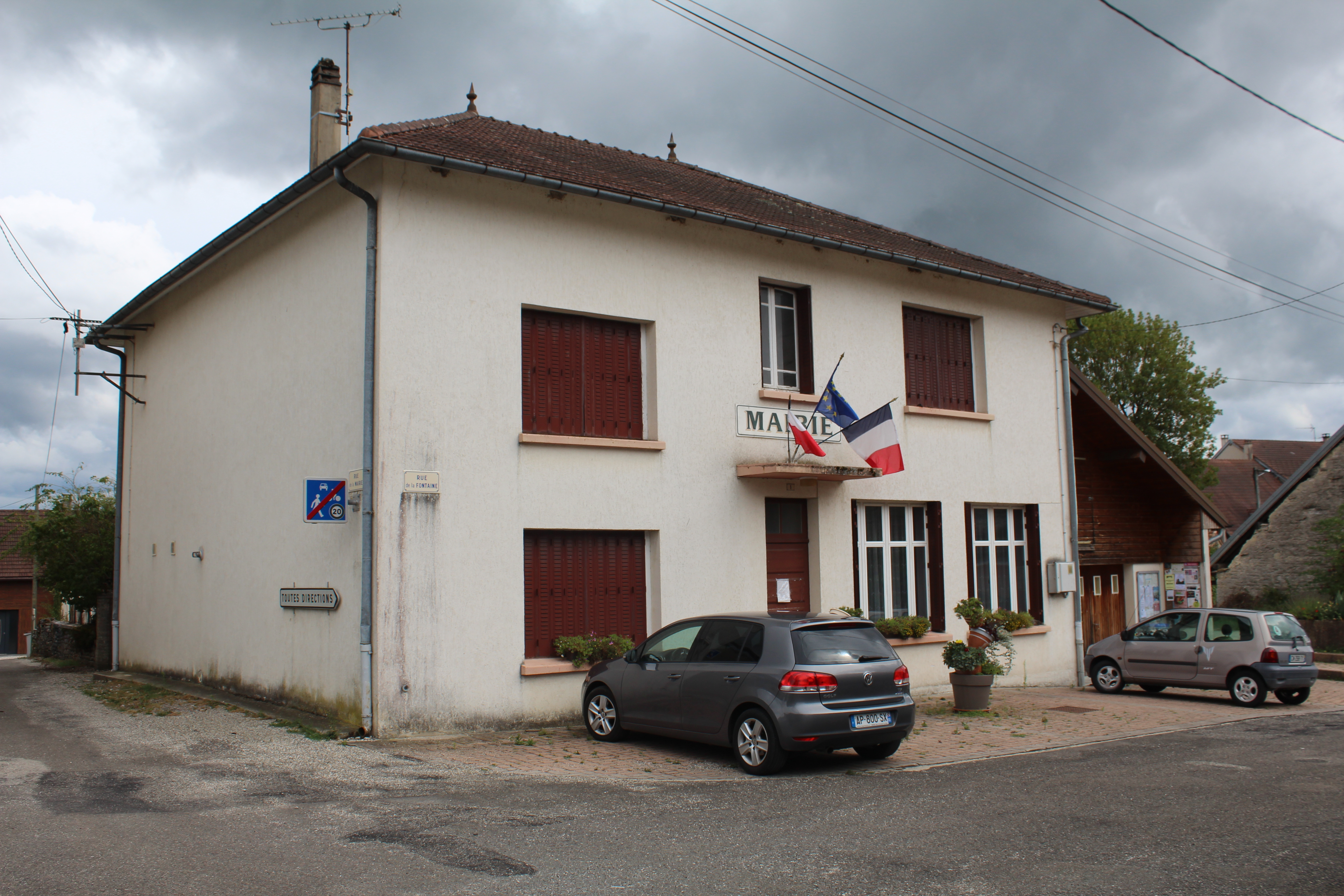
- The town hall in Mesnois
- Location of Mesnois
- Location within France Location within Bourgogne-Franche-Comté
- Coordinates: 46°36′06″N 5°41′25″E
- Country: France
- Region: Bourgogne-Franche-Comté
- Department: Jura
- Arrondissement: Lons-le-Saunier
- Canton: Saint-Laurent-en-Grandvaux

Government
  - Mayor (2020–2026): Sandrine Gauthier-Pacoud
- Area^{1}: 11.47 km^{2} (4.43 sq mi)
- Highest elevation: 703 m (2,306 ft)
- Lowest elevation: 434 m (1,424 ft)
- Population (2023): 162
  - Density: 14.1/km^{2} (36.6/sq mi)
- Time zone: UTC+01:00 (CET)
  - Summer (DST): UTC+02:00 (CEST)
- INSEE/Postal code: 39326 /39130
- ^{1} French Land Register data, which excludes lakes, ponds, glaciers > 1 km^{2} (0.386 sq mi or 247 acres) and river estuaries.

Mesnois (French pronunciation: [mɛnwa]) is a commune in the Jura department in Bourgogne-Franche-Comté in eastern France.

== Population ==
Historical population
Year	Pop.	±% p.a.
1968	158	—
1975	144	−1.32%
1982	166	+2.05%
1990	171	+0.37%
1999	154	−1.16%
2007	193	+2.86%
2012	200	+0.72%
2017	187	−1.34%
2023	162	−2.36%
Source: INSEE

== See also ==
- Communes of the Jura department
