= Pont-de-Poitte =

Commune in Bourgogne-Franche-Comté, France

- Commune
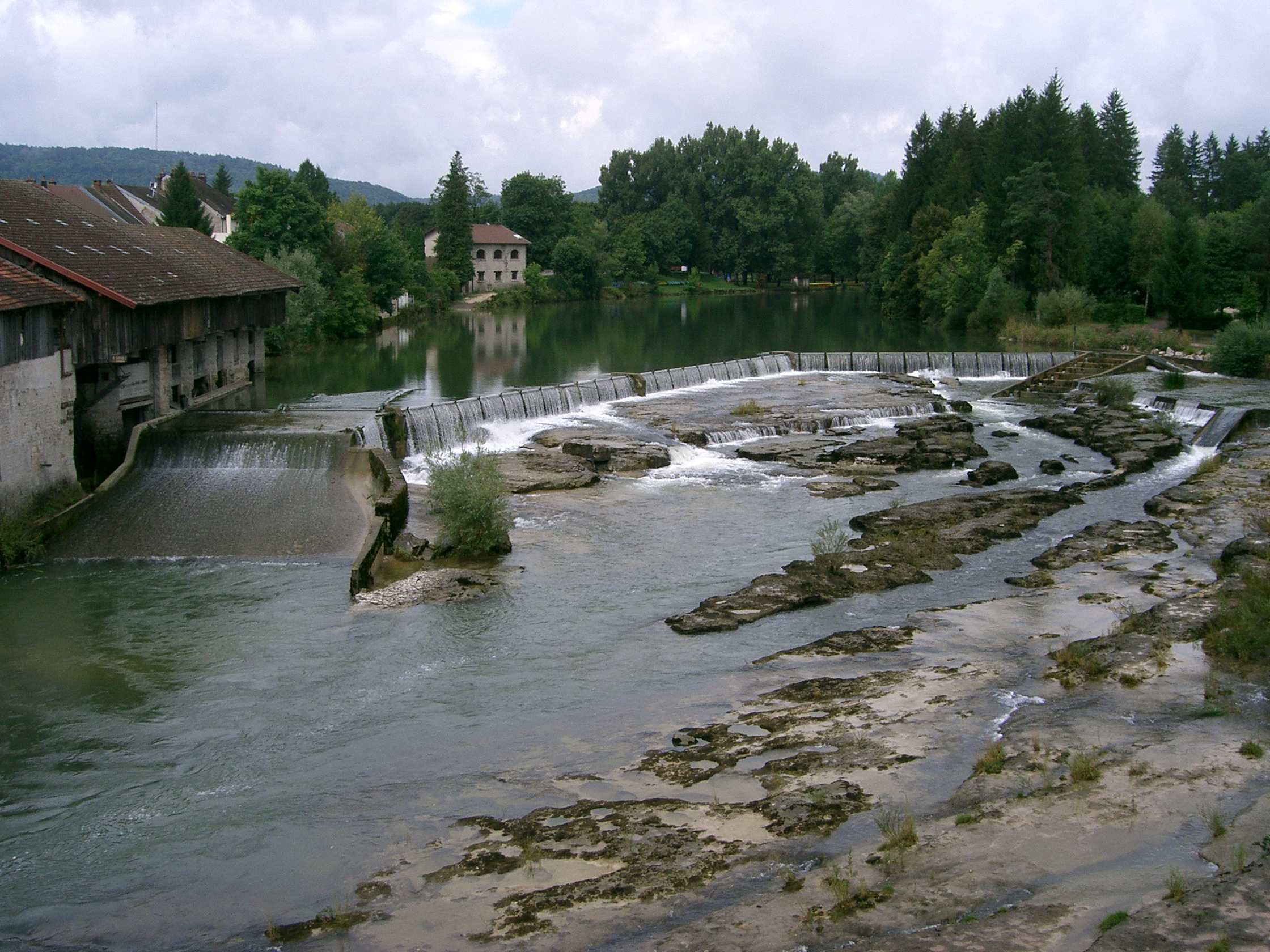
- The Ain River

- Coat of arms
- Location of Pont-de-Poitte
- Location within France Location within Bourgogne-Franche-Comté
- Coordinates: 46°35′04″N 5°41′45″E
- Country: France
- Region: Bourgogne-Franche-Comté
- Department: Jura
- Arrondissement: Lons-le-Saunier
- Canton: Saint-Laurent-en-Grandvaux

Government
  - Mayor (2020–2026): Christelle Deparis-Vincent
- Area^{1}: 7.02 km^{2} (2.71 sq mi)
- Highest elevation: 570 m (1,870 ft)
- Lowest elevation: 425 m (1,394 ft)
- Population (2023): 624
  - Density: 88.9/km^{2} (230/sq mi)
- Time zone: UTC+01:00 (CET)
  - Summer (DST): UTC+02:00 (CEST)
- INSEE/Postal code: 39435 /39130
- ^{1} French Land Register data, which excludes lakes, ponds, glaciers > 1 km^{2} (0.386 sq mi or 247 acres) and river estuaries.

Pont-de-Poitte (French pronunciation: [pɔ̃ də pwat]; Arpitan: Pont-de-Poitou) is a commune in the Jura department in Bourgogne-Franche-Comté in eastern France.

== Population ==
Historical population
Year	Pop.	±% p.a.
1968	583	—
1975	592	+0.22%
1982	657	+1.50%
1990	638	−0.37%
1999	582	−1.02%
2007	643	+1.25%
2012	663	+0.61%
2017	647	−0.49%
2023	624	−0.60%
Source: INSEE

== See also ==
- Communes of the Jura department
