= La Latette =

Commune in Bourgogne-Franche-Comté, France

- Commune
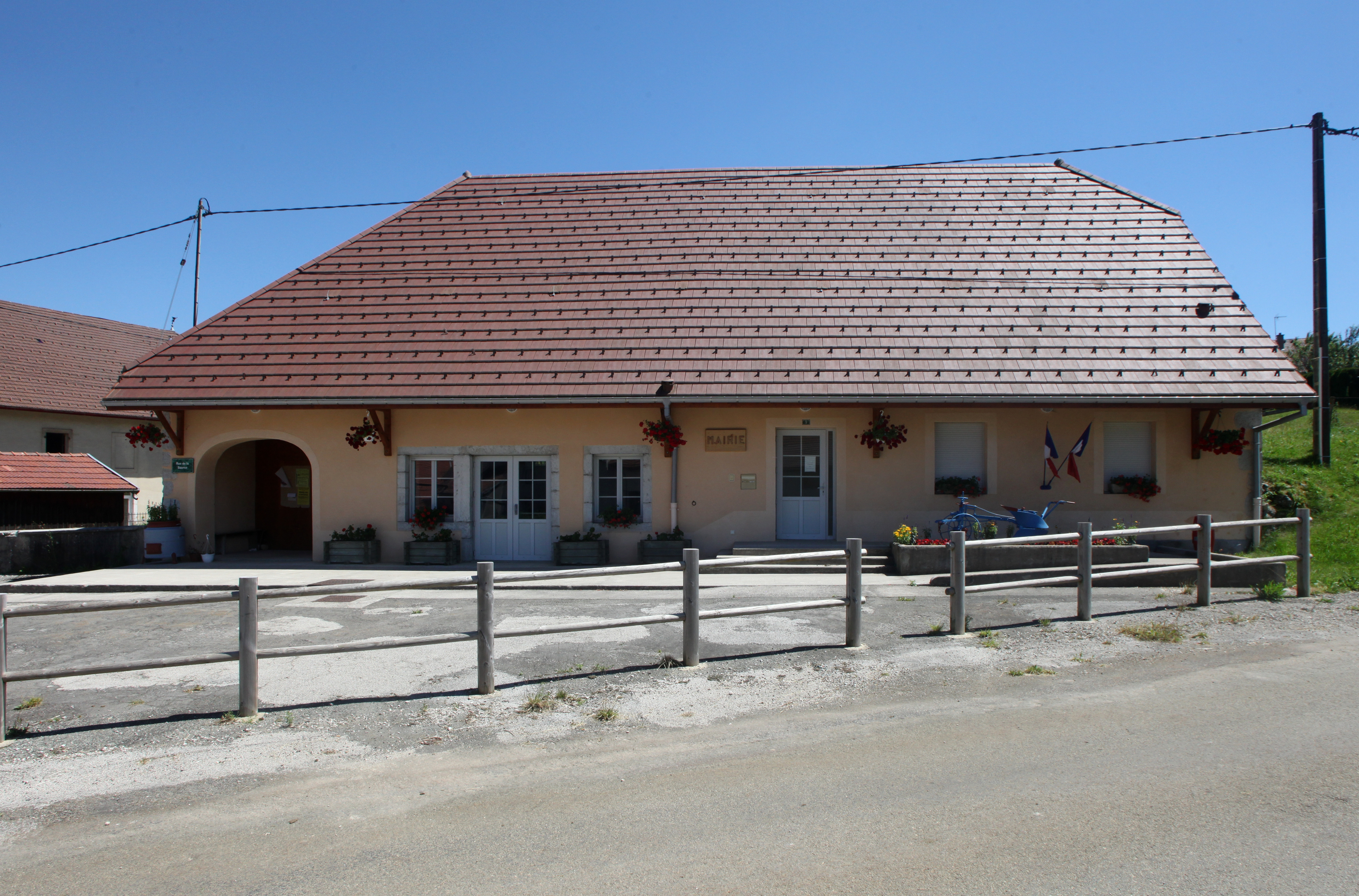
- The town hall in La Latette
- Location of La Latette
- Location within France Location within Bourgogne-Franche-Comté
- Coordinates: 46°45′10″N 6°05′27″E
- Country: France
- Region: Bourgogne-Franche-Comté
- Department: Jura
- Arrondissement: Lons-le-Saunier
- Canton: Saint-Laurent-en-Grandvaux

Government
  - Mayor (2020–2026): Marie-Thérèse David
- Area^{1}: 5.89 km^{2} (2.27 sq mi)
- Highest elevation: 971 m (3,186 ft)
- Lowest elevation: 829 m (2,720 ft)
- Population (2023): 76
  - Density: 13/km^{2} (33/sq mi)
- Time zone: UTC+01:00 (CET)
  - Summer (DST): UTC+02:00 (CEST)
- INSEE/Postal code: 39282 /39250
- ^{1} French Land Register data, which excludes lakes, ponds, glaciers > 1 km^{2} (0.386 sq mi or 247 acres) and river estuaries.

La Latette (French pronunciation: [la latɛt]) is a commune in the Jura department in Bourgogne-Franche-Comté in eastern France.

== Population ==
Historical population
Year	Pop.	±% p.a.
1968	101	—
1975	85	−2.43%
1982	72	−2.34%
1990	72	+0.00%
1999	77	+0.75%
2007	65	−2.10%
2012	78	+3.71%
2017	73	−1.32%
2023	76	+0.67%
Source: INSEE

== See also ==
- Communes of the Jura department
