= La Charme =

Commune in Bourgogne-Franche-Comté, France

- Commune
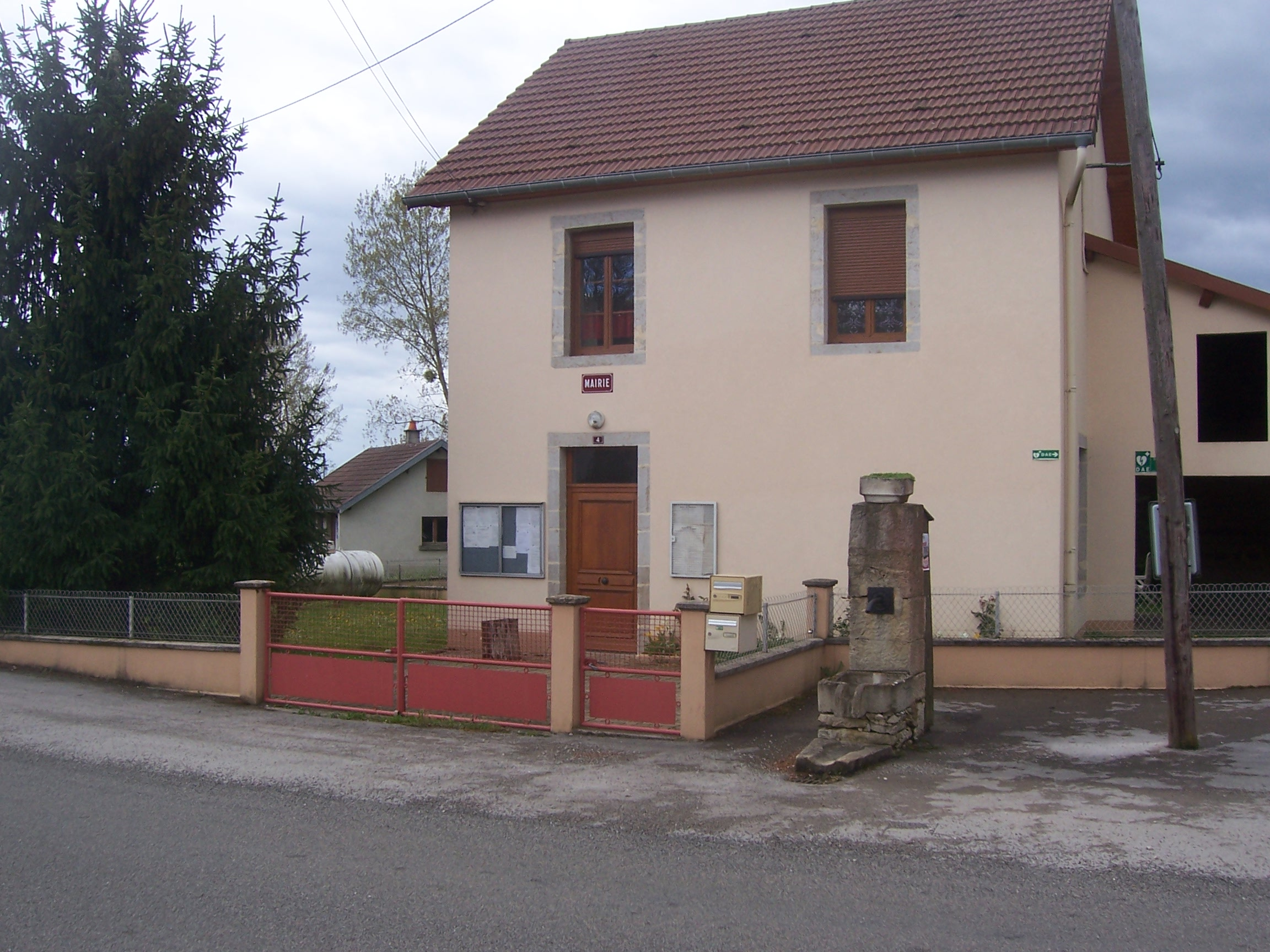
- Town hall
- Location of La Charme
- Location within France Location within Bourgogne-Franche-Comté
- Coordinates: 46°50′42″N 5°33′33″E
- Country: France
- Region: Bourgogne-Franche-Comté
- Department: Jura
- Arrondissement: Lons-le-Saunier
- Canton: Bletterans

Government
  - Mayor (2020–2026): Claude Rosain
- Area^{1}: 3.71 km^{2} (1.43 sq mi)
- Highest elevation: 255 m (837 ft)
- Lowest elevation: 209 m (686 ft)
- Population (2023): 65
  - Density: 18/km^{2} (45/sq mi)
- Time zone: UTC+01:00 (CET)
  - Summer (DST): UTC+02:00 (CEST)
- INSEE/Postal code: 39110 /39230
- ^{1} French Land Register data, which excludes lakes, ponds, glaciers > 1 km^{2} (0.386 sq mi or 247 acres) and river estuaries.

La Charme (French pronunciation: [la ʃaʁm]) is a commune in the Jura department in Bourgogne-Franche-Comté in eastern France.

== Population ==
Historical population
Year	Pop.	±% p.a.
1968	51	—
1975	50	−0.28%
1982	39	−3.49%
1990	37	−0.66%
1999	39	+0.59%
2007	41	+0.63%
2012	61	+8.27%
2017	68	+2.20%
2023	65	−0.75%
Source: INSEE

== See also ==
- Communes of the Jura department
