= Canton of Bletterans =

Coordinates: 46.75°N 5.45°E

The canton of Bletterans is an administrative division of the Jura department, eastern France. Its borders were modified at the French canton reorganisation which came into effect in March 2015. Its seat is in Bletterans.

It consists of the following communes:

1. Abergement-le-Petit
2. Arlay
3. Aumont
4. Barretaine
5. Bersaillin
6. Biefmorin
7. Bletterans
8. Bois-de-Gand
9. Brainans
10. Champrougier
11. Chapelle-Voland
12. La Charme
13. La Chassagne
14. Le Chateley
15. Chaumergy
16. La Chaux-en-Bresse
17. Chemenot
18. Chêne-Sec
19. Colonne
20. Commenailles
21. Cosges
22. Darbonnay
23. Desnes
24. Les Deux-Fays
25. Fontainebrux
26. Foulenay
27. Francheville
28. Grozon
29. Larnaud
30. Lombard
31. Mantry
32. Miéry
33. Monay
34. Montholier
35. Nance
36. Neuvilley
37. Oussières
38. Passenans
39. Plasne
40. Quintigny
41. Recanoz
42. Relans
43. Les Repôts
44. Ruffey-sur-Seille
45. Rye
46. Saint-Lamain
47. Saint-Lothain
48. Sellières
49. Sergenaux
50. Sergenon
51. Toulouse-le-Château
52. Tourmont
53. Vers-sous-Sellières
54. Villerserine
55. Villers-les-Bois
56. Villevieux
57. Le Villey
58. Vincent-Froideville
