= Plasne =

Commune in Bourgogne-Franche-Comté, France

- Commune
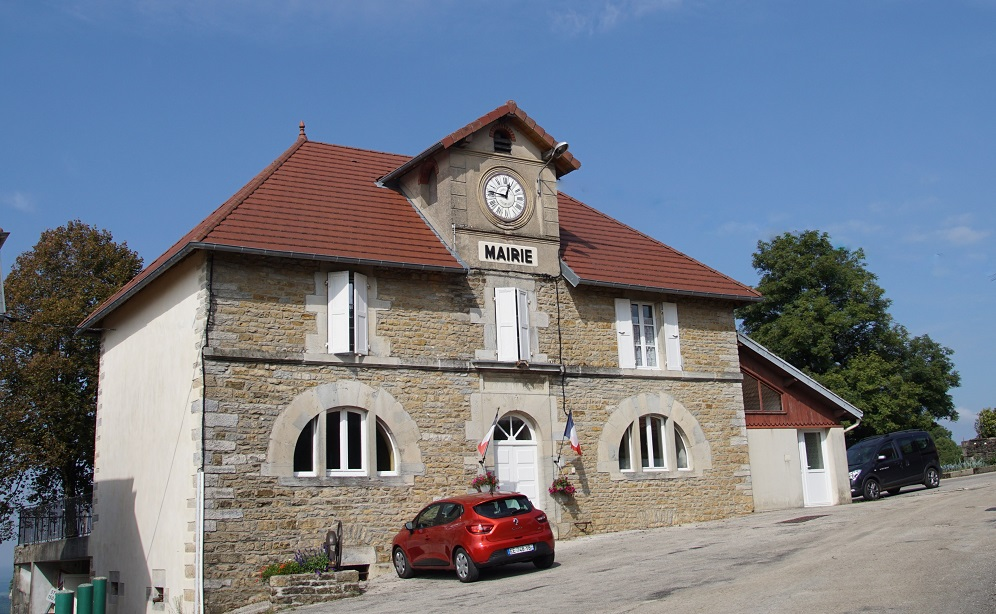
- The town hall in Plasne
- Location of Plasne
- Location within France Location within Bourgogne-Franche-Comté
- Coordinates: 46°48′06″N 5°41′11″E
- Country: France
- Region: Bourgogne-Franche-Comté
- Department: Jura
- Arrondissement: Dole
- Canton: Bletterans

Government
  - Mayor (2020–2026): Florence Berodier
- Area^{1}: 7.76 km^{2} (3.00 sq mi)
- Highest elevation: 606 m (1,988 ft)
- Lowest elevation: 480 m (1,570 ft)
- Population (2023): 197
  - Density: 25.4/km^{2} (65.8/sq mi)
- Time zone: UTC+01:00 (CET)
  - Summer (DST): UTC+02:00 (CEST)
- INSEE/Postal code: 39426 /39210
- ^{1} French Land Register data, which excludes lakes, ponds, glaciers > 1 km^{2} (0.386 sq mi or 247 acres) and river estuaries.

Plasne (French pronunciation: [plan]; Arpitan: Plainou) is a commune in the Jura department in Bourgogne-Franche-Comté in eastern France.

== Population ==
Historical population
Year	Pop.	±% p.a.
1968	226	—
1975	240	+0.86%
1982	237	−0.18%
1990	215	−1.21%
1999	254	+1.87%
2007	254	+0.00%
2012	239	−1.21%
2017	218	−1.82%
2023	197	−1.67%
Source: INSEE

== See also ==
- Communes of the Jura department
