= Le Villey =

- Commune
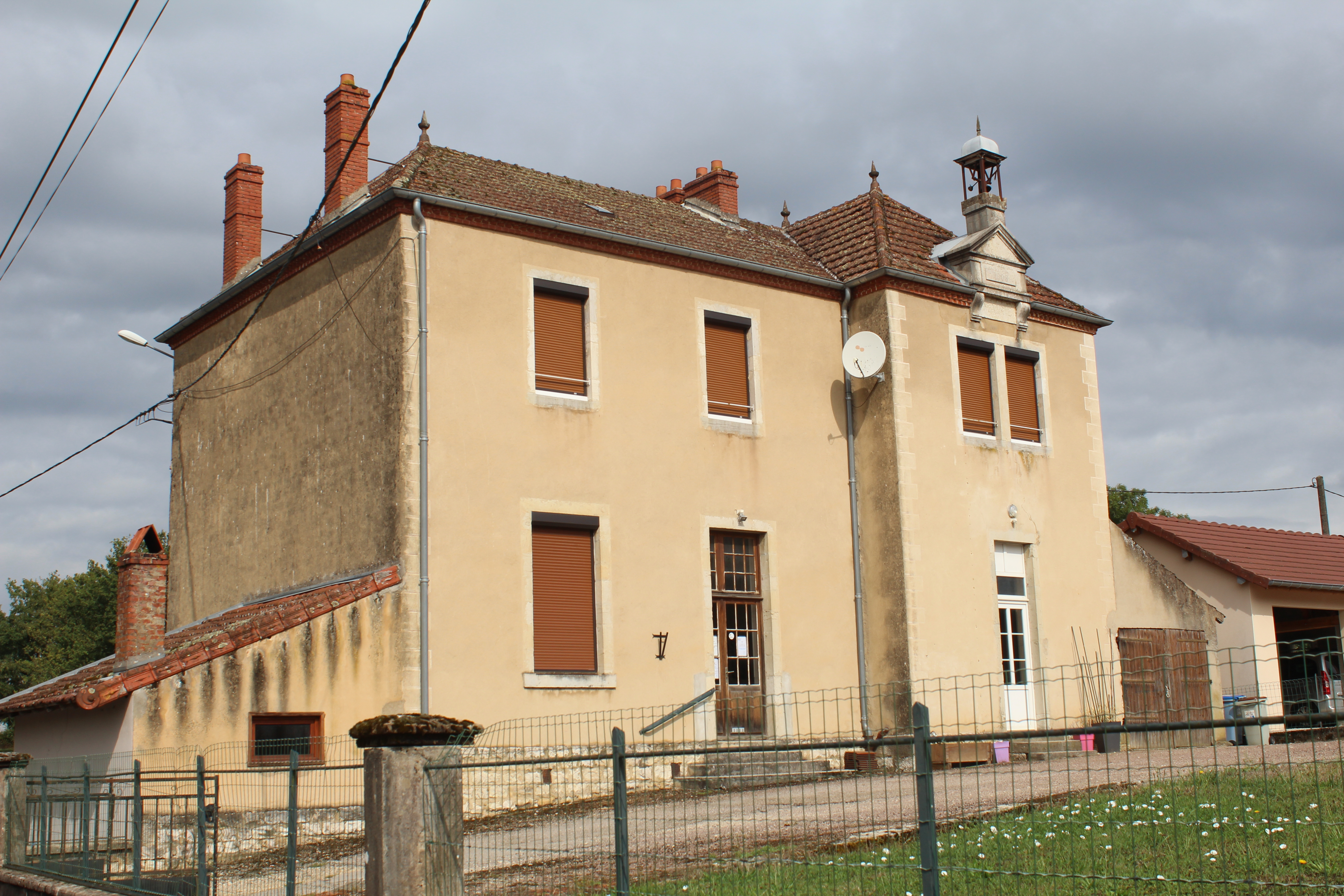
- The town hall in Le Villey

- Coat of arms
- Location of Le Villey
- Location within France Location within Bourgogne-Franche-Comté
- Coordinates: 46°50′45″N 5°30′30″E
- Country: France
- Region: Bourgogne-Franche-Comté
- Department: Jura
- Arrondissement: Lons-le-Saunier
- Canton: Bletterans

Government
  - Mayor (2020–2026): Sébastien Guichard
- Area^{1}: 3.57 km^{2} (1.38 sq mi)
- Highest elevation: 222 m (728 ft)
- Lowest elevation: 198 m (650 ft)
- Population (2023): 94
  - Density: 26/km^{2} (68/sq mi)
- Time zone: UTC+01:00 (CET)
  - Summer (DST): UTC+02:00 (CEST)
- INSEE/Postal code: 39575 /39230
- ^{1} French Land Register data, which excludes lakes, ponds, glaciers > 1 km^{2} (0.386 sq mi or 247 acres) and river estuaries.

Le Villey is a commune in the Jura department in Bourgogne-Franche-Comté in eastern France.

== Population ==
Historical population
Year	Pop.	±% p.a.
1968	120	—
1975	100	−2.57%
1982	83	−2.63%
1990	101	+2.48%
1999	92	−1.03%
2007	74	−2.68%
2012	84	+2.57%
2017	89	+1.16%
2023	94	+0.92%
Source: INSEE

== See also ==
- Communes of the Jura department
