= Larnaud =

Commune in Bourgogne-Franche-Comté, France

- Commune
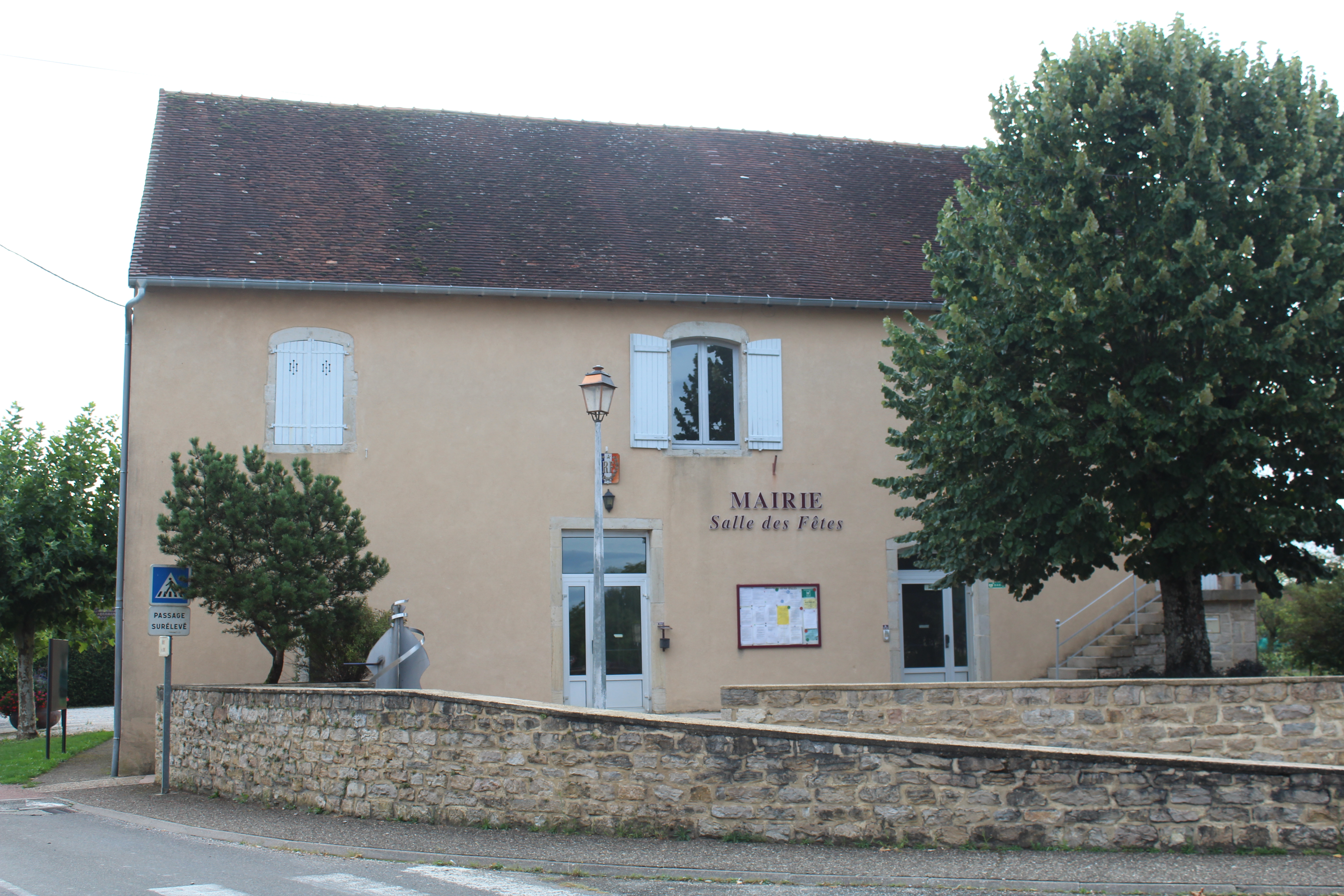
- The town hall in Larnaud
- Location of Larnaud
- Location within France Location within Bourgogne-Franche-Comté
- Coordinates: 46°42′44″N 5°27′18″E
- Country: France
- Region: Bourgogne-Franche-Comté
- Department: Jura
- Arrondissement: Lons-le-Saunier
- Canton: Bletterans

Government
  - Mayor (2020–2026): David Guyot
- Area^{1}: 10.67 km^{2} (4.12 sq mi)
- Highest elevation: 236 m (774 ft)
- Lowest elevation: 197 m (646 ft)
- Population (2023): 608
  - Density: 57.0/km^{2} (148/sq mi)
- Time zone: UTC+01:00 (CET)
  - Summer (DST): UTC+02:00 (CEST)
- INSEE/Postal code: 39279 /39140
- ^{1} French Land Register data, which excludes lakes, ponds, glaciers > 1 km^{2} (0.386 sq mi or 247 acres) and river estuaries.

Larnaud (French pronunciation: [laʁno]) is a commune in the Jura department in Bourgogne-Franche-Comté in eastern France.

== Population ==
Historical population
Year	Pop.	±% p.a.
1968	277	—
1975	292	+0.76%
1982	358	+2.95%
1990	449	+2.87%
1999	493	+1.04%
2007	516	+0.57%
2012	544	+1.06%
2017	603	+2.08%
2023	608	+0.14%
Source: INSEE

== See also ==
- Communes of the Jura department
