= Chapelle-Voland =

Commune in Bourgogne-Franche-Comté, France

- Commune
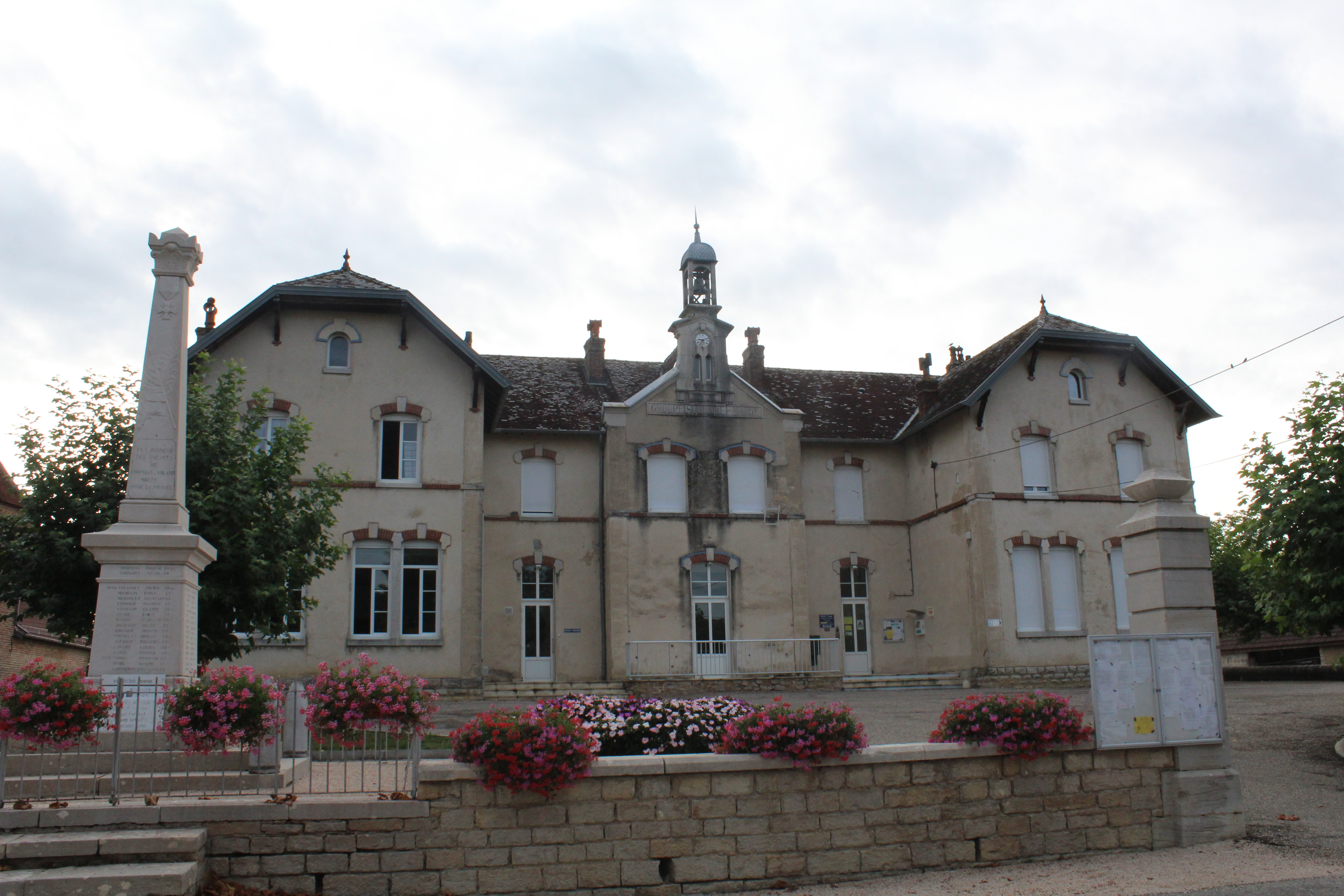
- The town hall in Chapelle-Voland
- Location of Chapelle-Voland
- Location within France Location within Bourgogne-Franche-Comté
- Coordinates: 46°48′14″N 5°22′44″E
- Country: France
- Region: Bourgogne-Franche-Comté
- Department: Jura
- Arrondissement: Lons-le-Saunier
- Canton: Bletterans

Government
  - Mayor (2020–2026): Sylvie Bonnin
- Area^{1}: 30.50 km^{2} (11.78 sq mi)
- Highest elevation: 218 m (715 ft)
- Lowest elevation: 183 m (600 ft)
- Population (2023): 638
  - Density: 20.9/km^{2} (54.2/sq mi)
- Time zone: UTC+01:00 (CET)
  - Summer (DST): UTC+02:00 (CEST)
- INSEE/Postal code: 39104 /39140
- ^{1} French Land Register data, which excludes lakes, ponds, glaciers > 1 km^{2} (0.386 sq mi or 247 acres) and river estuaries.

Chapelle-Voland (French pronunciation: [ʃapɛl vɔlɑ̃]) is a commune in the Jura department in Bourgogne-Franche-Comté in eastern France.

== Population ==
Historical population
Year	Pop.	±% p.a.
1968	822	—
1975	703	−2.21%
1982	615	−1.89%
1990	596	−0.39%
1999	567	−0.55%
2007	607	+0.86%
2012	623	+0.52%
2017	602	−0.68%
2023	638	+0.97%
Source: INSEE

== See also ==
- Communes of the Jura department
