= Montholier =

Commune in Bourgogne-Franche-Comté, France

- Commune
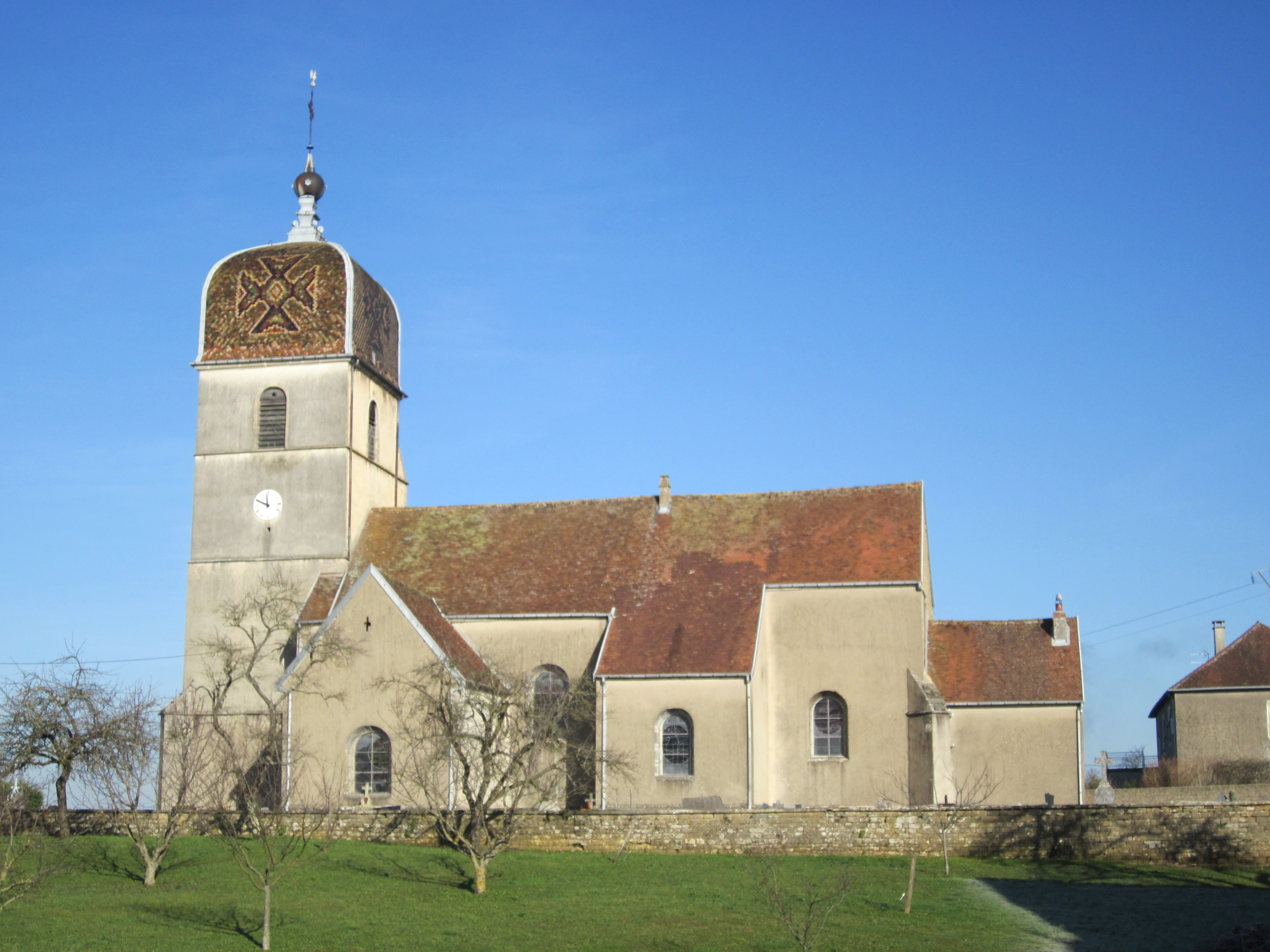
- The church in Montholier
- Location of Montholier
- Location within France Location within Bourgogne-Franche-Comté
- Coordinates: 46°53′55″N 5°38′54″E
- Country: France
- Region: Bourgogne-Franche-Comté
- Department: Jura
- Arrondissement: Dole
- Canton: Bletterans

Government
  - Mayor (2021–2026): Pierre Leroy
- Area^{1}: 7.99 km^{2} (3.08 sq mi)
- Highest elevation: 310 m (1,020 ft)
- Lowest elevation: 228 m (748 ft)
- Population (2023): 365
  - Density: 45.7/km^{2} (118/sq mi)
- Time zone: UTC+01:00 (CET)
  - Summer (DST): UTC+02:00 (CEST)
- INSEE/Postal code: 39354 /39800
- ^{1} French Land Register data, which excludes lakes, ponds, glaciers > 1 km^{2} (0.386 sq mi or 247 acres) and river estuaries.

Montholier (French pronunciation: [mɔ̃tɔlje]) is a commune in the Jura department in Bourgogne-Franche-Comté in eastern France.

== See also ==
- Communes of the Jura department
