= Toulouse-le-Château =

- Commune
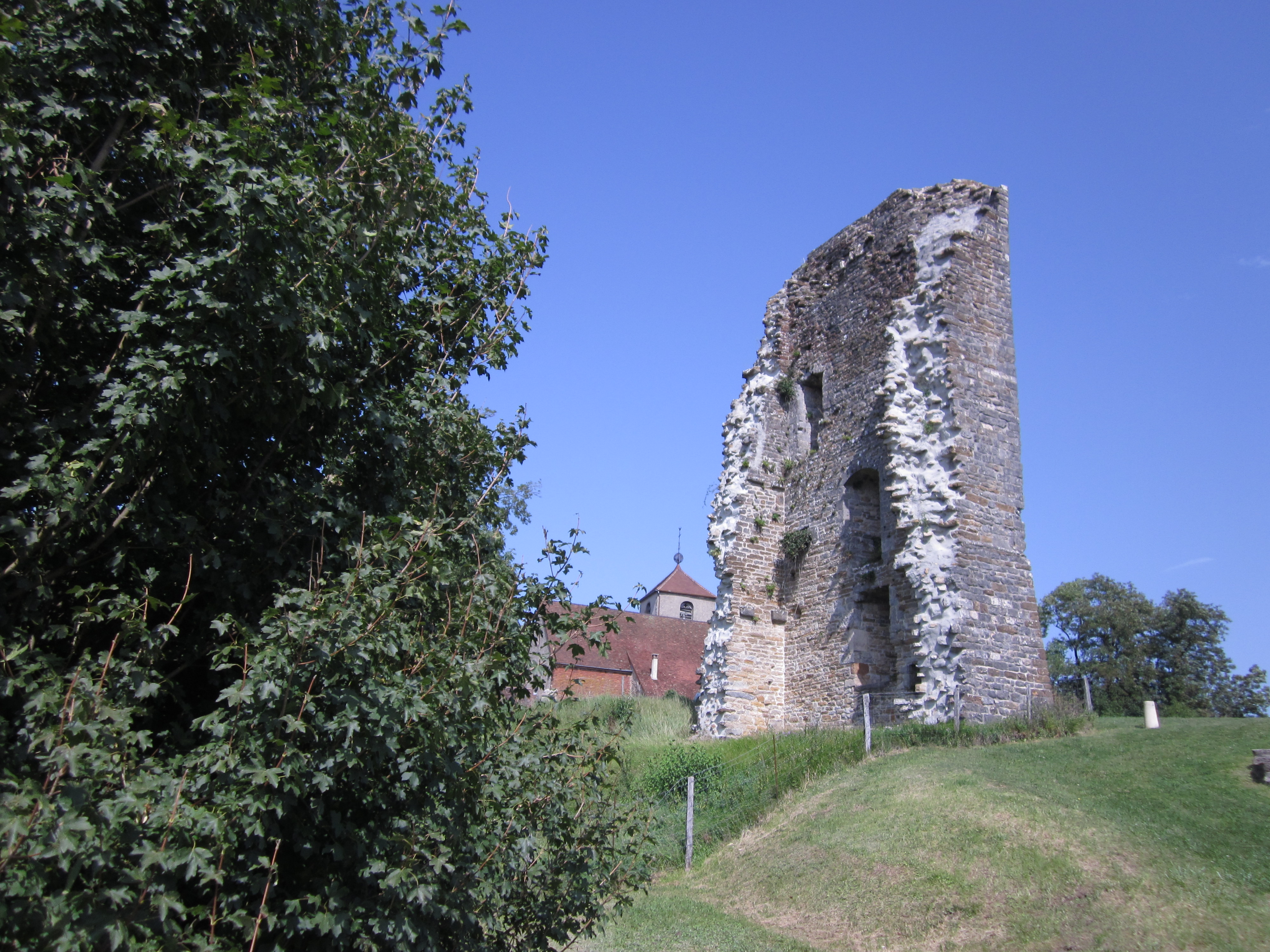
- Ruins of the chateau
- Location of Toulouse-le-Château
- Location within France Location within Bourgogne-Franche-Comté
- Coordinates: 46°49′26″N 5°35′16″E
- Country: France
- Region: Bourgogne-Franche-Comté
- Department: Jura
- Arrondissement: Lons-le-Saunier
- Canton: Bletterans

Government
  - Mayor (2020–2026): Jean-Christian Kryzek
- Area^{1}: 4.16 km^{2} (1.61 sq mi)
- Highest elevation: 352 m (1,155 ft)
- Lowest elevation: 223 m (732 ft)
- Population (2023): 204
  - Density: 49.0/km^{2} (127/sq mi)
- Time zone: UTC+01:00 (CET)
  - Summer (DST): UTC+02:00 (CEST)
- INSEE/Postal code: 39533 /39230
- ^{1} French Land Register data, which excludes lakes, ponds, glaciers > 1 km^{2} (0.386 sq mi or 247 acres) and river estuaries.

Toulouse-le-Château (French pronunciation: [tuluz lə ʃɑto]; literally 'Toulouse the Château') is a commune in the Jura department in the Bourgogne-Franche-Comté region in eastern France.

== Population ==
Historical population
Year	Pop.	±% p.a.
1968	173	—
1975	146	−2.39%
1982	160	+1.32%
1990	180	+1.48%
1999	159	−1.37%
2007	209	+3.48%
2012	215	+0.57%
2017	221	+0.55%
2023	204	−1.33%
Source: INSEE

== See also ==
- Communes of the Jura department
