= Foulenay =

Commune in Bourgogne-Franche-Comté, France

- Commune
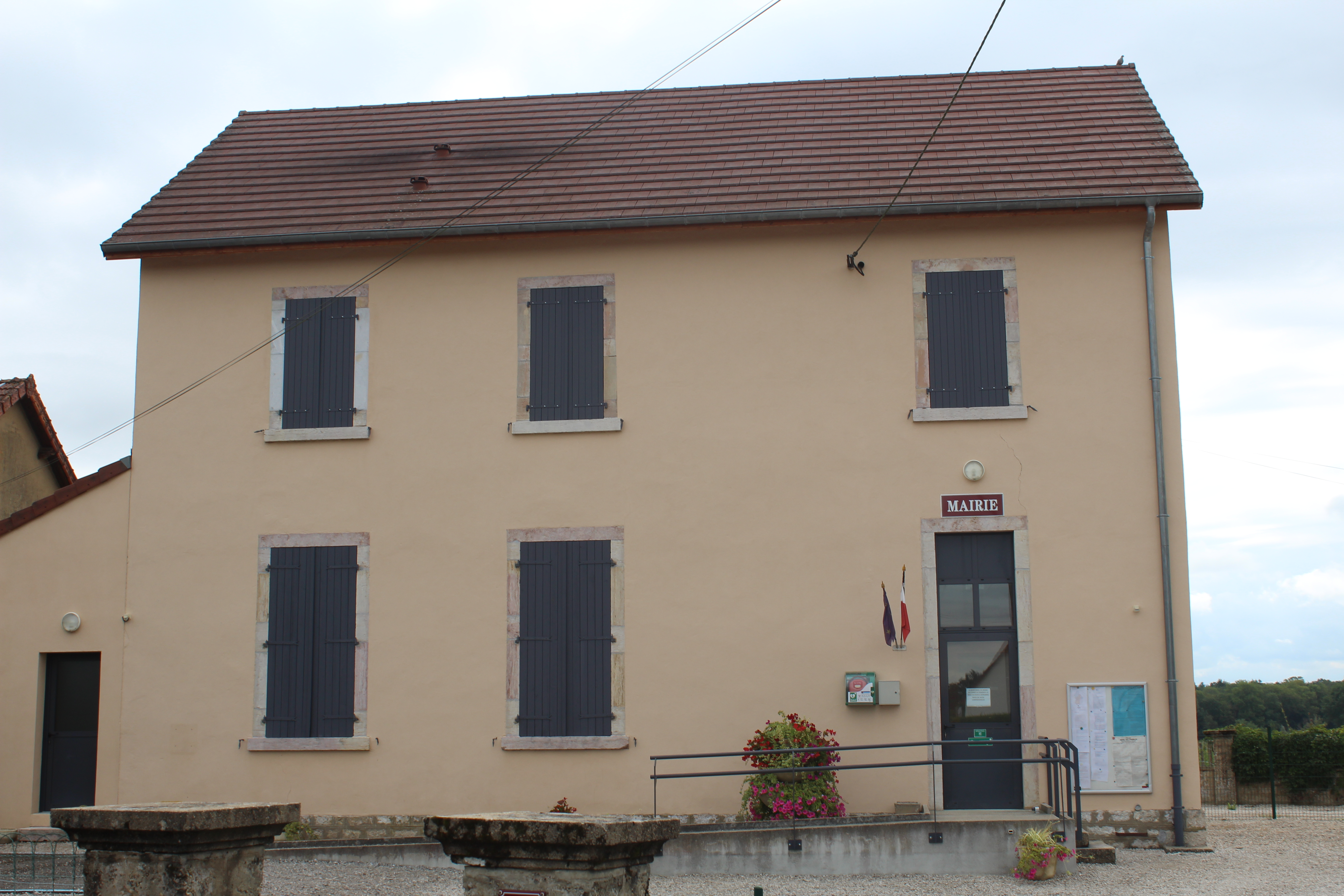
- The town hall in Foulenay
- Location of Foulenay
- Location within France Location within Bourgogne-Franche-Comté
- Coordinates: 46°51′52″N 5°29′09″E
- Country: France
- Region: Bourgogne-Franche-Comté
- Department: Jura
- Arrondissement: Lons-le-Saunier
- Canton: Bletterans

Government
  - Mayor (2024–2026): Robert Pelissard
- Area^{1}: 4.16 km^{2} (1.61 sq mi)
- Highest elevation: 221 m (725 ft)
- Lowest elevation: 197 m (646 ft)
- Population (2023): 82
  - Density: 20/km^{2} (51/sq mi)
- Time zone: UTC+01:00 (CET)
  - Summer (DST): UTC+02:00 (CEST)
- INSEE/Postal code: 39234 /39230
- ^{1} French Land Register data, which excludes lakes, ponds, glaciers > 1 km^{2} (0.386 sq mi or 247 acres) and river estuaries.

Foulenay (French pronunciation: [fulnɛ]) is a commune in the Jura department and Bourgogne-Franche-Comté region of eastern France.

== Population ==
Historical population
Year	Pop.	±% p.a.
1968	118	—
1975	104	−1.79%
1982	83	−3.17%
1990	93	+1.43%
1999	81	−1.52%
2007	80	−0.16%
2012	85	+1.22%
2017	84	−0.24%
2023	82	−0.40%
Source: INSEE

== See also ==
- Communes of the Jura department
