= Chemenot =

Commune in Bourgogne-Franche-Comté, France

- Commune
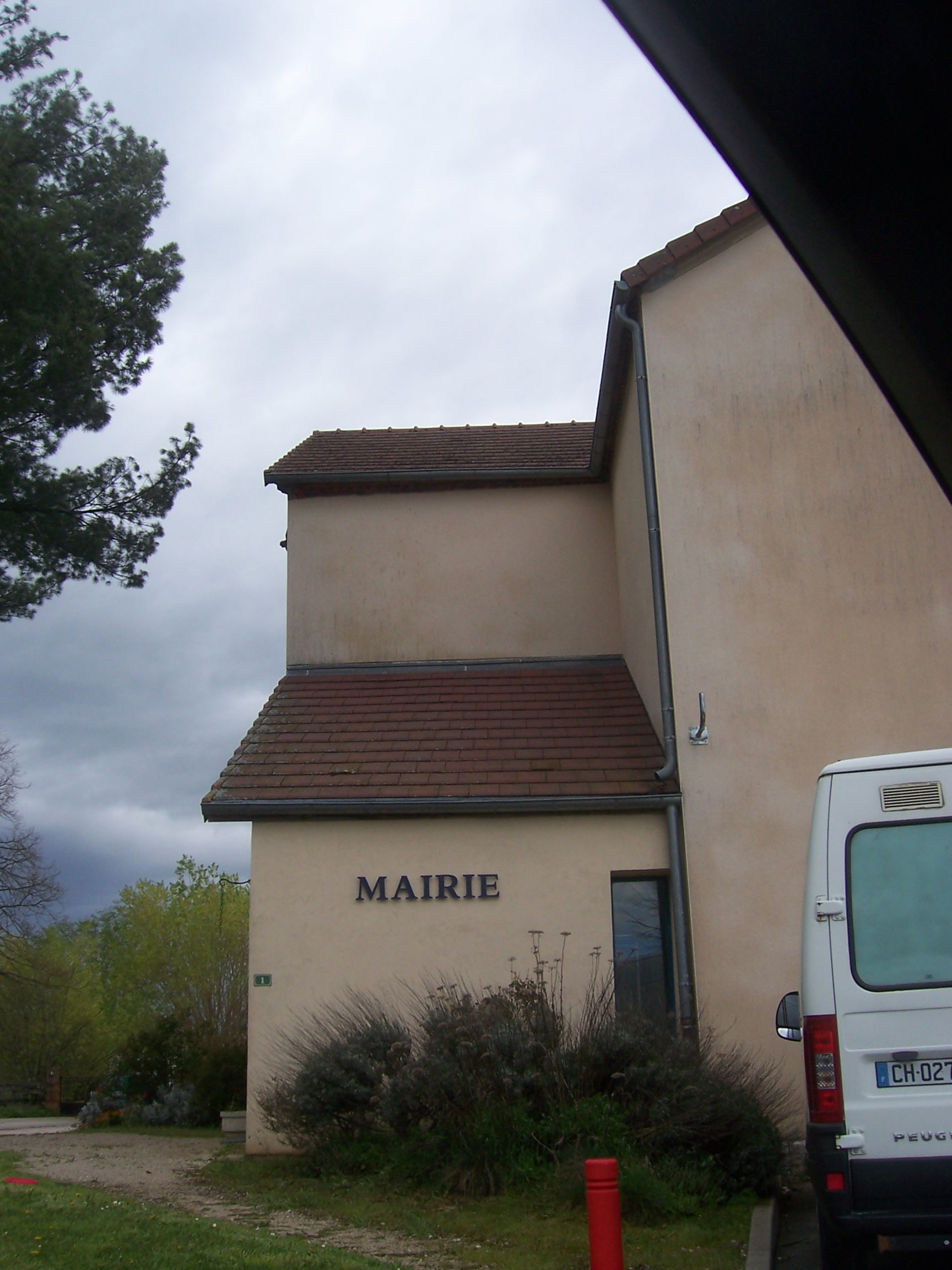
- Town hall
- Location of Chemenot
- Location within France Location within Bourgogne-Franche-Comté
- Coordinates: 46°52′04″N 5°32′04″E
- Country: France
- Region: Bourgogne-Franche-Comté
- Department: Jura
- Arrondissement: Lons-le-Saunier
- Canton: Bletterans

Government
  - Mayor (2020–2026): Serge Grévy
- Area^{1}: 4.74 km^{2} (1.83 sq mi)
- Highest elevation: 227 m (745 ft)
- Lowest elevation: 203 m (666 ft)
- Population (2023): 31
  - Density: 6.5/km^{2} (17/sq mi)
- Time zone: UTC+01:00 (CET)
  - Summer (DST): UTC+02:00 (CEST)
- INSEE/Postal code: 39136 /39230
- ^{1} French Land Register data, which excludes lakes, ponds, glaciers > 1 km^{2} (0.386 sq mi or 247 acres) and river estuaries.

Chemenot (French pronunciation: [ʃəmno]) is a commune in the Jura department in Bourgogne-Franche-Comté in eastern France.

== Population ==
Historical population
Year	Pop.	±% p.a.
1968	47	—
1975	60	+3.55%
1982	48	−3.14%
1990	41	−1.95%
1999	35	−1.74%
2007	39	+1.36%
2012	36	−1.59%
2017	37	+0.55%
2023	31	−2.91%
Source: INSEE

== See also ==
- Communes of the Jura department
