= Saint-Lamain =

Commune in Bourgogne-Franche-Comté, France

- Commune
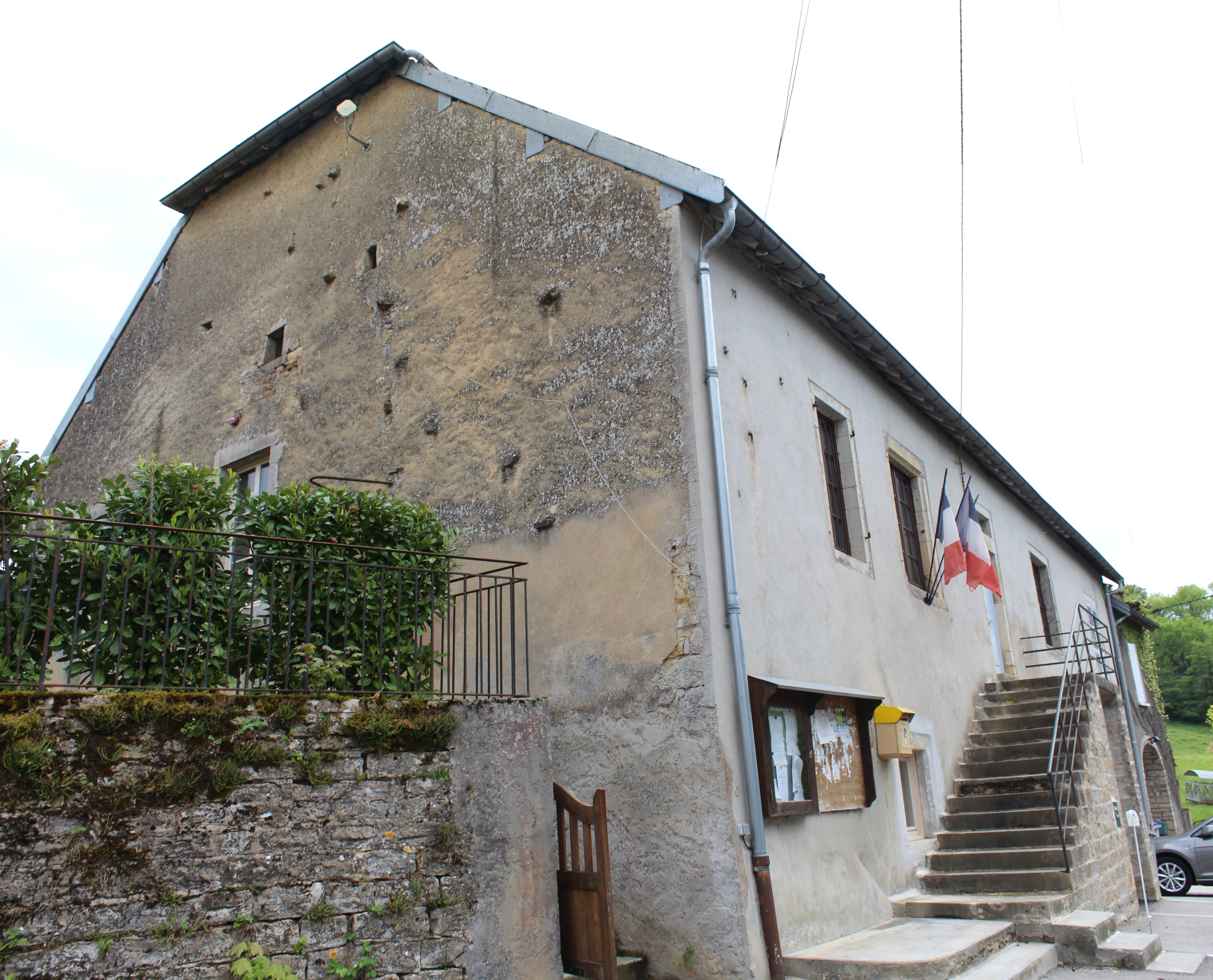
- The town hall in Saint-Lamain
- Location of Saint-Lamain
- Location within France Location within Bourgogne-Franche-Comté
- Coordinates: 46°47′47″N 5°36′11″E
- Country: France
- Region: Bourgogne-Franche-Comté
- Department: Jura
- Arrondissement: Lons-le-Saunier
- Canton: Bletterans

Government
  - Mayor (2020–2026): Denis Bacheley
- Area^{1}: 4.16 km^{2} (1.61 sq mi)
- Highest elevation: 335 m (1,099 ft)
- Lowest elevation: 236 m (774 ft)
- Population (2023): 128
  - Density: 30.8/km^{2} (79.7/sq mi)
- Time zone: UTC+01:00 (CET)
  - Summer (DST): UTC+02:00 (CEST)
- INSEE/Postal code: 39486 /39230
- ^{1} French Land Register data, which excludes lakes, ponds, glaciers > 1 km^{2} (0.386 sq mi or 247 acres) and river estuaries.

Saint-Lamain (French pronunciation: [sɛ̃ lamɛ̃]) is a commune in the Jura department in the Bourgogne-Franche-Comté region in eastern France.

== Population ==
Historical population
| Year | Pop. | ±% p.a. |
|---|---|---|
| 1968 | 115 | — |
| 1975 | 110 | −0.63% |
| 1982 | 114 | +0.51% |
| 1990 | 110 | −0.45% |
| 1999 | 120 | +0.97% |
| 2007 | 121 | +0.10% |
| 2012 | 119 | −0.33% |
| 2017 | 115 | −0.68% |
| 2023 | 128 | +1.80% |
Source: INSEE

== See also ==
- Communes of the Jura department
