= Recanoz =

Commune in Bourgogne-Franche-Comté, France

- Commune
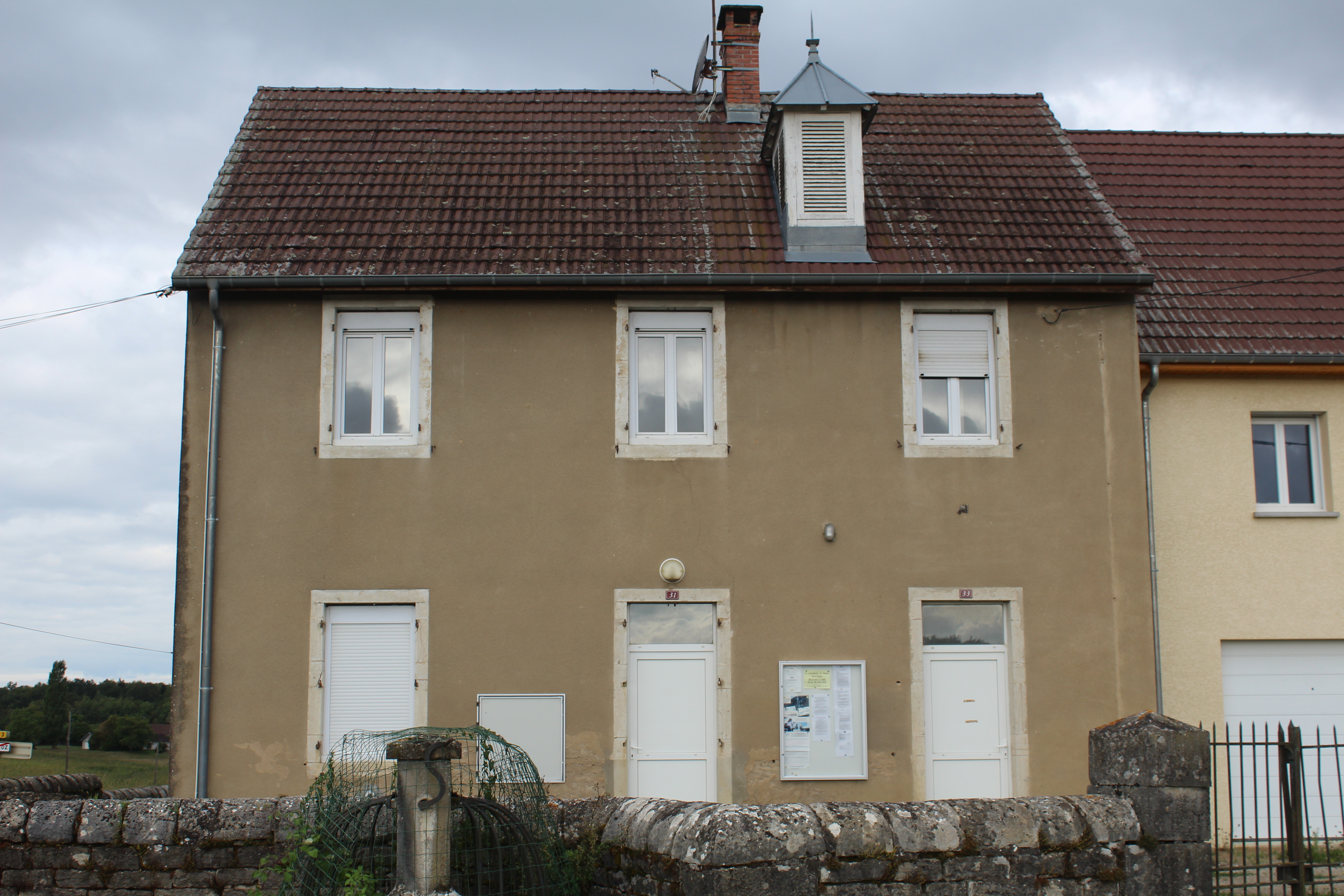
- The town hall in Recanoz
- Location of Recanoz
- Location within France Location within Bourgogne-Franche-Comté
- Coordinates: 46°48′29″N 5°30′23″E
- Country: France
- Region: Bourgogne-Franche-Comté
- Department: Jura
- Arrondissement: Lons-le-Saunier
- Canton: Bletterans

Government
  - Mayor (2020–2026): Daniel Jacquot
- Area^{1}: 3.01 km^{2} (1.16 sq mi)
- Highest elevation: 231 m (758 ft)
- Lowest elevation: 204 m (669 ft)
- Population (2023): 94
  - Density: 31/km^{2} (81/sq mi)
- Time zone: UTC+01:00 (CET)
  - Summer (DST): UTC+02:00 (CEST)
- INSEE/Postal code: 39454 /39230
- ^{1} French Land Register data, which excludes lakes, ponds, glaciers > 1 km^{2} (0.386 sq mi or 247 acres) and river estuaries.

Recanoz (French pronunciation: [ʁəkano]) is a commune in the Jura department in the region of Bourgogne-Franche-Comté in eastern France.

== Population ==
Historical population
Year	Pop.	±% p.a.
1968	68	—
1975	62	−1.31%
1982	46	−4.17%
1990	52	+1.54%
1999	52	+0.00%
2007	63	+2.43%
2012	92	+7.87%
2017	90	−0.44%
2023	94	+0.73%
Source: INSEE

== See also ==
- Communes of the Jura department
