= Mantry =

Commune in Bourgogne-Franche-Comté, France

- Commune
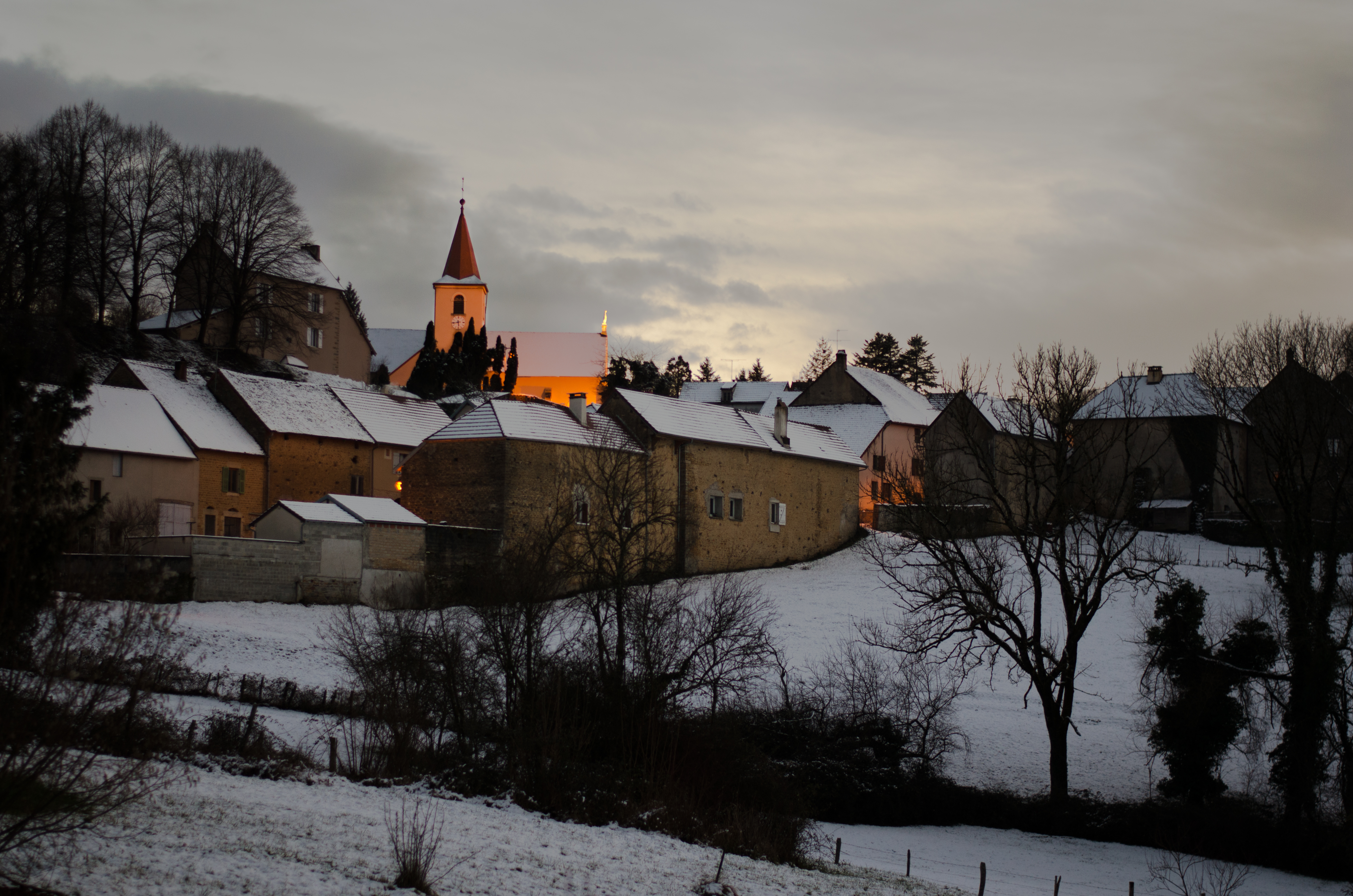
- A general view of Mantry
- Location of Mantry
- Location within France Location within Bourgogne-Franche-Comté
- Coordinates: 46°47′50″N 5°33′35″E
- Country: France
- Region: Bourgogne-Franche-Comté
- Department: Jura
- Arrondissement: Lons-le-Saunier
- Canton: Bletterans

Government
  - Mayor (2020–2026): Jean-Paul Gerdy
- Area^{1}: 10.83 km^{2} (4.18 sq mi)
- Highest elevation: 385 m (1,263 ft)
- Lowest elevation: 216 m (709 ft)
- Population (2023): 472
  - Density: 43.6/km^{2} (113/sq mi)
- Time zone: UTC+01:00 (CET)
  - Summer (DST): UTC+02:00 (CEST)
- INSEE/Postal code: 39310 /39230
- ^{1} French Land Register data, which excludes lakes, ponds, glaciers > 1 km^{2} (0.386 sq mi or 247 acres) and river estuaries.

Mantry (French pronunciation: [mɑ̃tʁi]) is a commune in the Jura department in Bourgogne-Franche-Comté in eastern France.

== Population ==
Historical population
Year	Pop.	±% p.a.
1968	454	—
1975	413	−1.34%
1982	425	+0.41%
1990	431	+0.18%
1999	456	+0.63%
2007	454	−0.05%
2012	443	−0.49%
2017	454	+0.49%
2023	472	+0.65%
Source: INSEE

== See also ==
- Communes of the Jura department
