= Les Repôts =

Commune in Bourgogne-Franche-Comté, France

- Commune
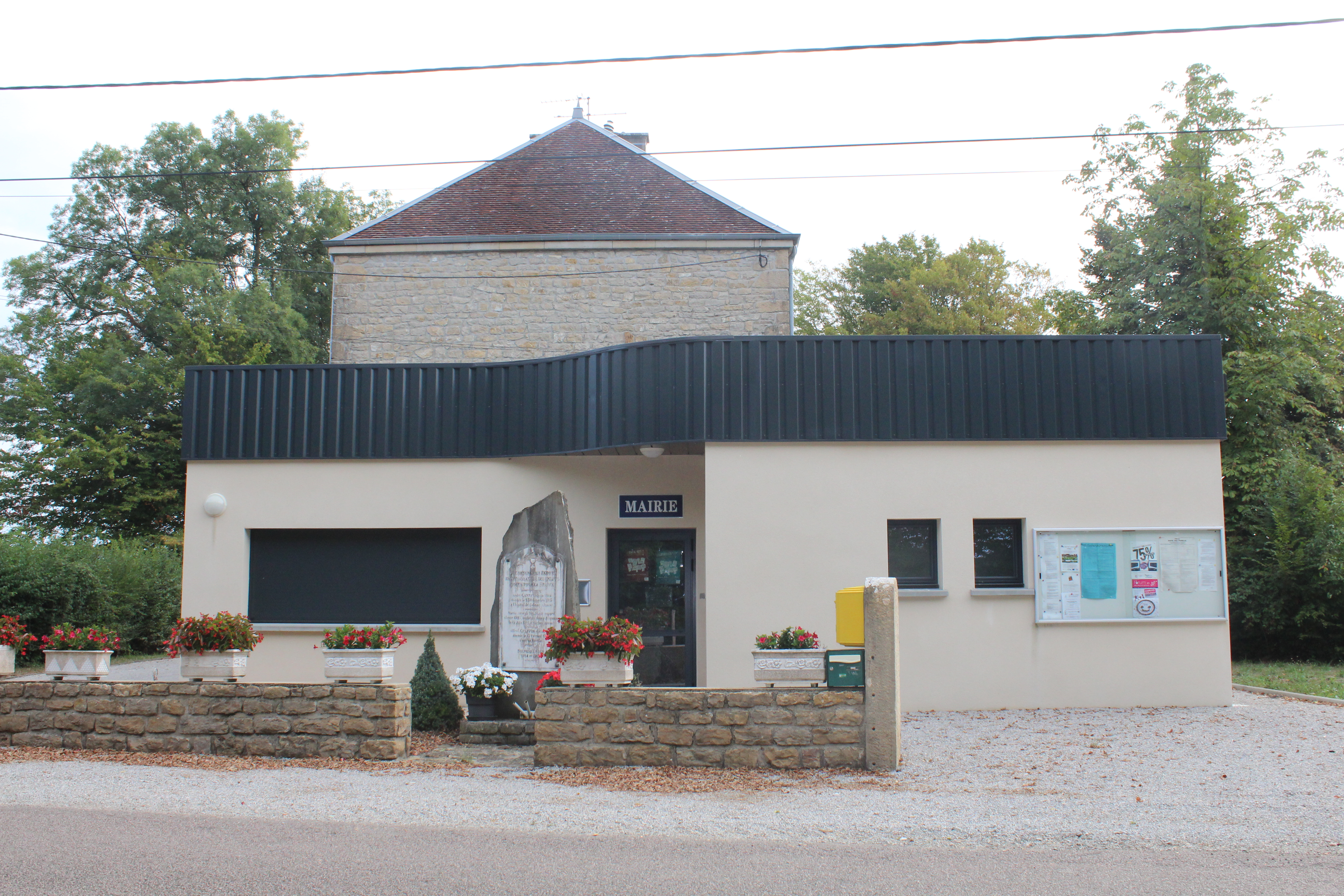
- The town hall in Les Repôts
- Location of Les Repôts
- Location within France Location within Bourgogne-Franche-Comté
- Coordinates: 46°40′59″N 5°24′57″E
- Country: France
- Region: Bourgogne-Franche-Comté
- Department: Jura
- Arrondissement: Lons-le-Saunier
- Canton: Bletterans

Government
  - Mayor (2020–2026): Didier Jouvenceau
- Area^{1}: 4.02 km^{2} (1.55 sq mi)
- Highest elevation: 220 m (720 ft)
- Lowest elevation: 199 m (653 ft)
- Population (2023): 56
  - Density: 14/km^{2} (36/sq mi)
- Time zone: UTC+01:00 (CET)
  - Summer (DST): UTC+02:00 (CEST)
- INSEE/Postal code: 39457 /39140
- ^{1} French Land Register data, which excludes lakes, ponds, glaciers > 1 km^{2} (0.386 sq mi or 247 acres) and river estuaries.

Les Repôts (French pronunciation: [le ʁəpo]) is a commune in the Jura department in the region of Bourgogne-Franche-Comté in eastern France.

== Population ==
Historical population
Year	Pop.	±% p.a.
1968	29	—
1975	20	−5.17%
1982	29	+5.45%
1990	29	+0.00%
1999	23	−2.54%
2007	31	+3.80%
2012	47	+8.68%
2017	52	+2.04%
2023	56	+1.24%
Source: INSEE

== See also ==
- Communes of the Jura department
