= Biefmorin =

Commune in Bourgogne-Franche-Comté, France

- Commune
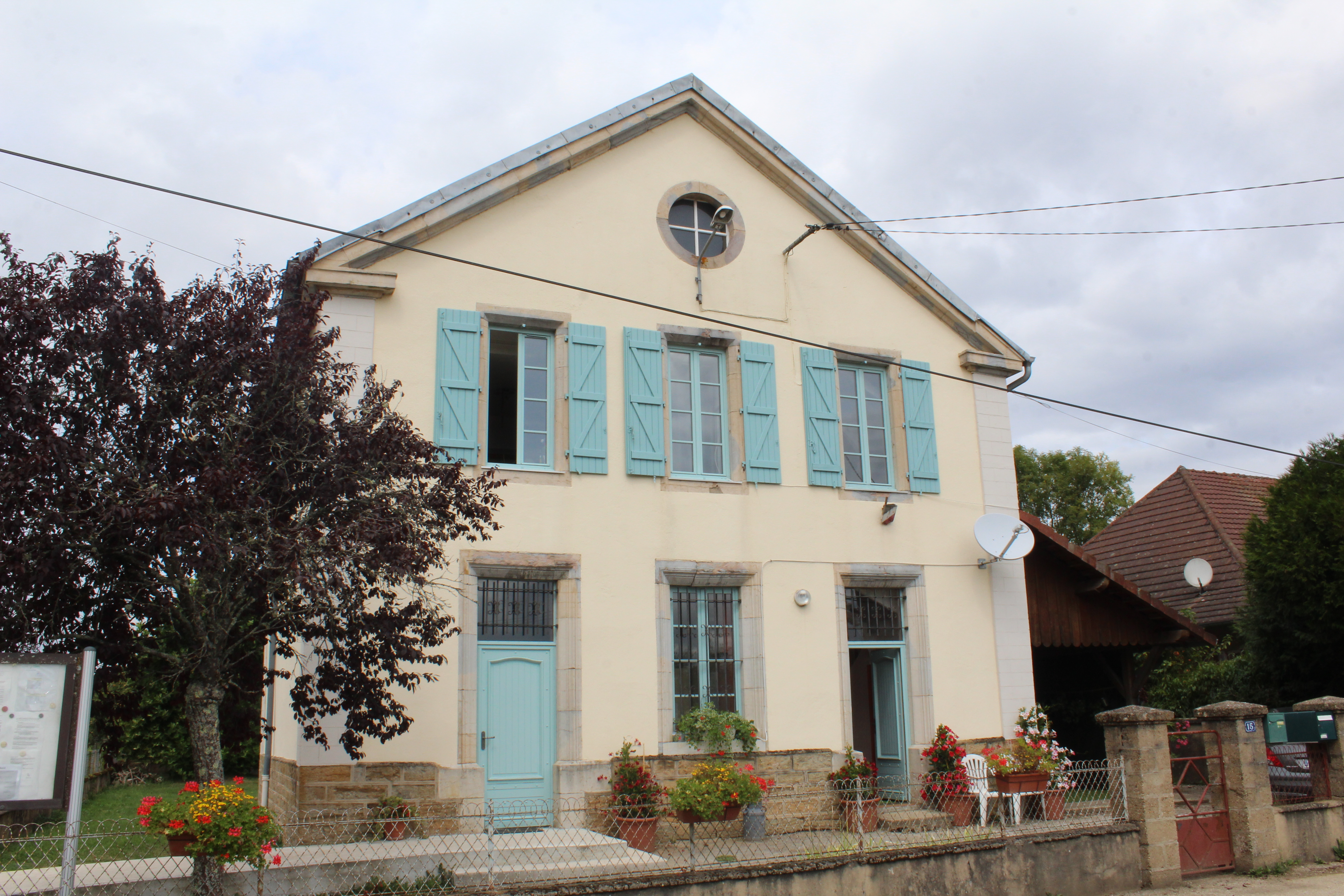
- The town hall in Biefmorin
- Location of Biefmorin
- Location within France Location within Bourgogne-Franche-Comté
- Coordinates: 46°54′07″N 5°33′31″E
- Country: France
- Region: Bourgogne-Franche-Comté
- Department: Jura
- Arrondissement: Dole
- Canton: Bletterans

Government
  - Mayor (2020–2026): Roland Berthelier
- Area^{1}: 11.25 km^{2} (4.34 sq mi)
- Highest elevation: 246 m (807 ft)
- Lowest elevation: 205 m (673 ft)
- Population (2023): 91
  - Density: 8.1/km^{2} (21/sq mi)
- Time zone: UTC+01:00 (CET)
  - Summer (DST): UTC+02:00 (CEST)
- INSEE/Postal code: 39054 /39800
- ^{1} French Land Register data, which excludes lakes, ponds, glaciers > 1 km^{2} (0.386 sq mi or 247 acres) and river estuaries.

Biefmorin is a commune in the Jura department in Bourgogne-Franche-Comté in eastern France.

== Population ==
Historical population
Year	Pop.	±% p.a.
1968	75	—
1975	63	−2.46%
1982	63	+0.00%
1990	59	−0.82%
1999	67	+1.42%
2007	76	+1.59%
2012	77	+0.26%
2017	98	+4.94%
2023	91	−1.23%
Source: INSEE

== See also ==
- Communes of the Jura department
