= Villerserine =

- Commune
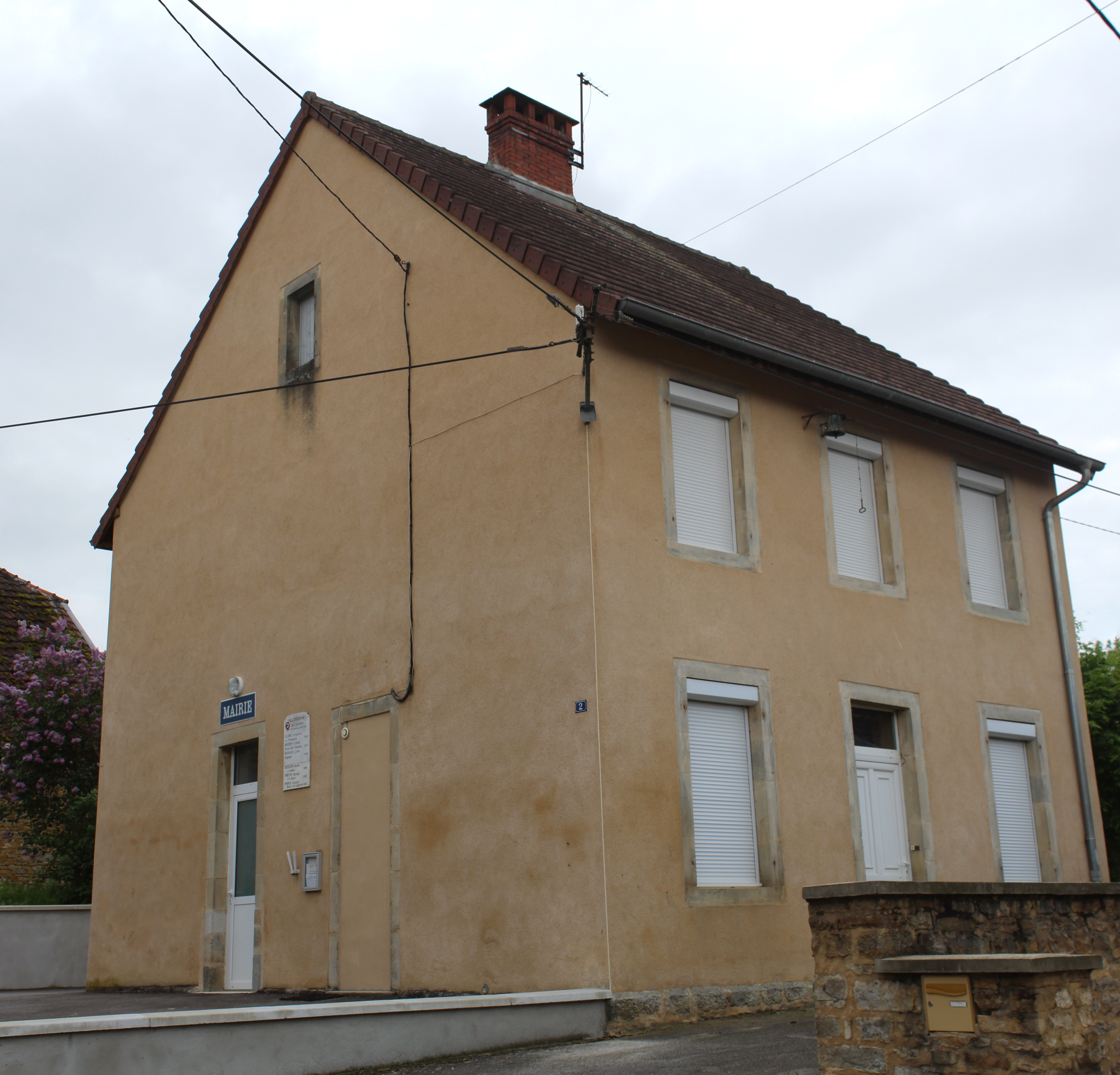
- The town hall in Villerserine
- Location of Villerserine
- Location within France Location within Bourgogne-Franche-Comté
- Coordinates: 46°51′31″N 5°38′34″E
- Country: France
- Region: Bourgogne-Franche-Comté
- Department: Jura
- Arrondissement: Dole
- Canton: Bletterans

Government
  - Mayor (2020–2026): Michel Bontemps
- Area^{1}: 2.85 km^{2} (1.10 sq mi)
- Highest elevation: 271 m (889 ft)
- Lowest elevation: 239 m (784 ft)
- Population (2023): 33
  - Density: 12/km^{2} (30/sq mi)
- Time zone: UTC+01:00 (CET)
  - Summer (DST): UTC+02:00 (CEST)
- INSEE/Postal code: 39568 /39800
- ^{1} French Land Register data, which excludes lakes, ponds, glaciers > 1 km^{2} (0.386 sq mi or 247 acres) and river estuaries.

Villerserine (French pronunciation: [vilɛʁsəʁin]) is a commune in the Jura department in the Bourgogne-Franche-Comté region in eastern France.

== Population ==
Historical population
Year	Pop.	±% p.a.
1968	53	—
1975	47	−1.70%
1982	46	−0.31%
1990	45	−0.27%
1999	42	−0.76%
2007	35	−2.25%
2012	55	+9.46%
2017	51	−1.50%
2023	33	−7.00%
Source: INSEE

== See also ==
- Communes of the Jura department
