= Bois-de-Gand =

Commune in Bourgogne-Franche-Comté, France

- Commune
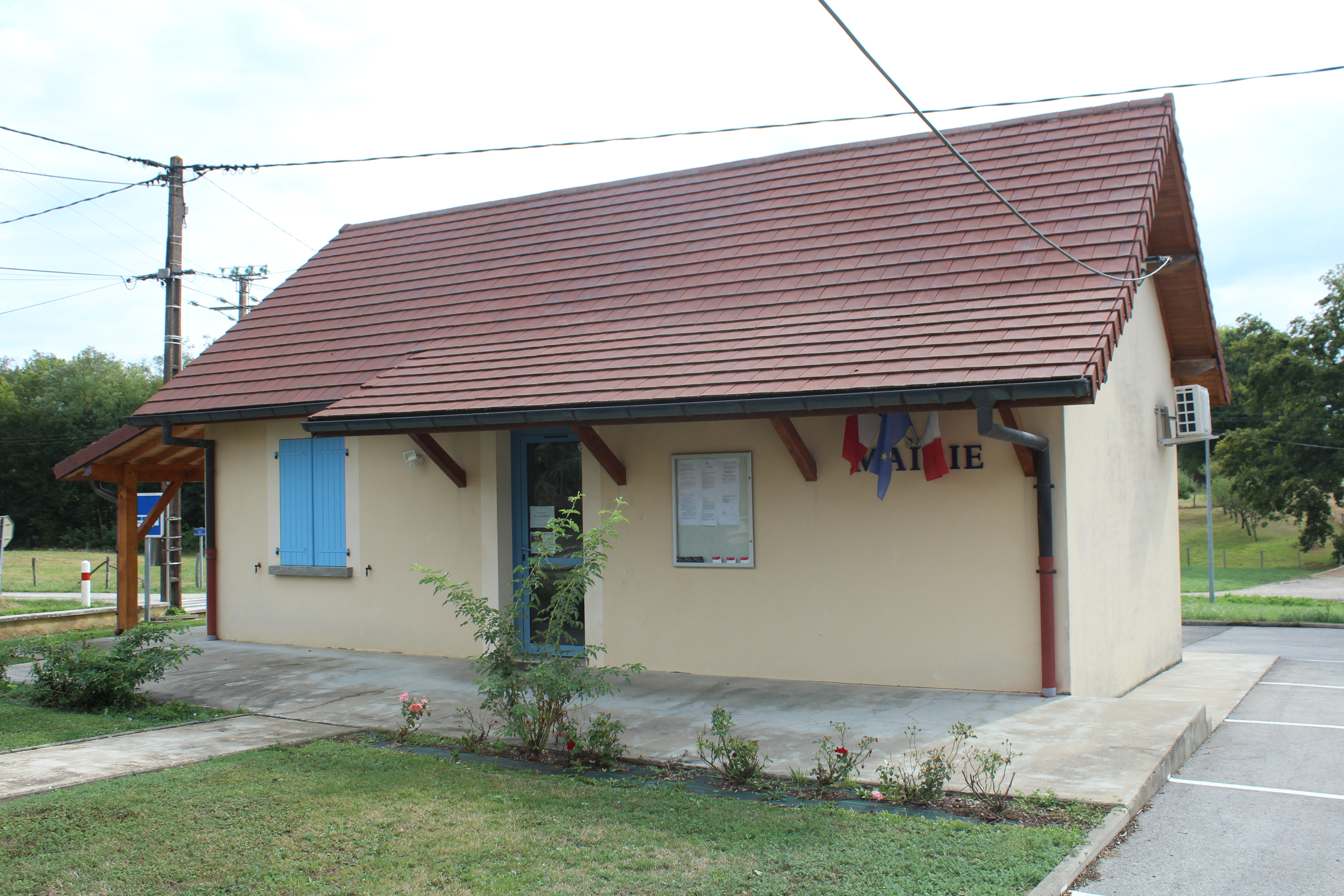
- The town hall in Bois-de-Gand
- Location of Bois-de-Gand
- Location within France Location within Bourgogne-Franche-Comté
- Coordinates: 46°49′38″N 5°30′02″E
- Country: France
- Region: Bourgogne-Franche-Comté
- Department: Jura
- Arrondissement: Lons-le-Saunier
- Canton: Bletterans

Government
  - Mayor (2020–2026): Éric Montuelle
- Area^{1}: 3.25 km^{2} (1.25 sq mi)
- Highest elevation: 226 m (741 ft)
- Lowest elevation: 204 m (669 ft)
- Population (2023): 60
  - Density: 18/km^{2} (48/sq mi)
- Time zone: UTC+01:00 (CET)
  - Summer (DST): UTC+02:00 (CEST)
- INSEE/Postal code: 39060 /39230
- ^{1} French Land Register data, which excludes lakes, ponds, glaciers > 1 km^{2} (0.386 sq mi or 247 acres) and river estuaries.

Bois-de-Gand (French pronunciation: [bwa də ɡɑ̃]) is a commune in the Jura department in Bourgogne-Franche-Comté in Eastern France.

== Population ==
Historical population
Year	Pop.	±% p.a.
1968	69	—
1975	64	−1.07%
1982	63	−0.22%
1990	51	−2.61%
1999	62	+2.19%
2007	64	+0.40%
2012	59	−1.61%
2017	57	−0.69%
2023	60	+0.86%
Source: INSEE

== See also ==
- Communes of the Jura department
