= Le Chateley =

Commune in Bourgogne-Franche-Comté, France

- Commune
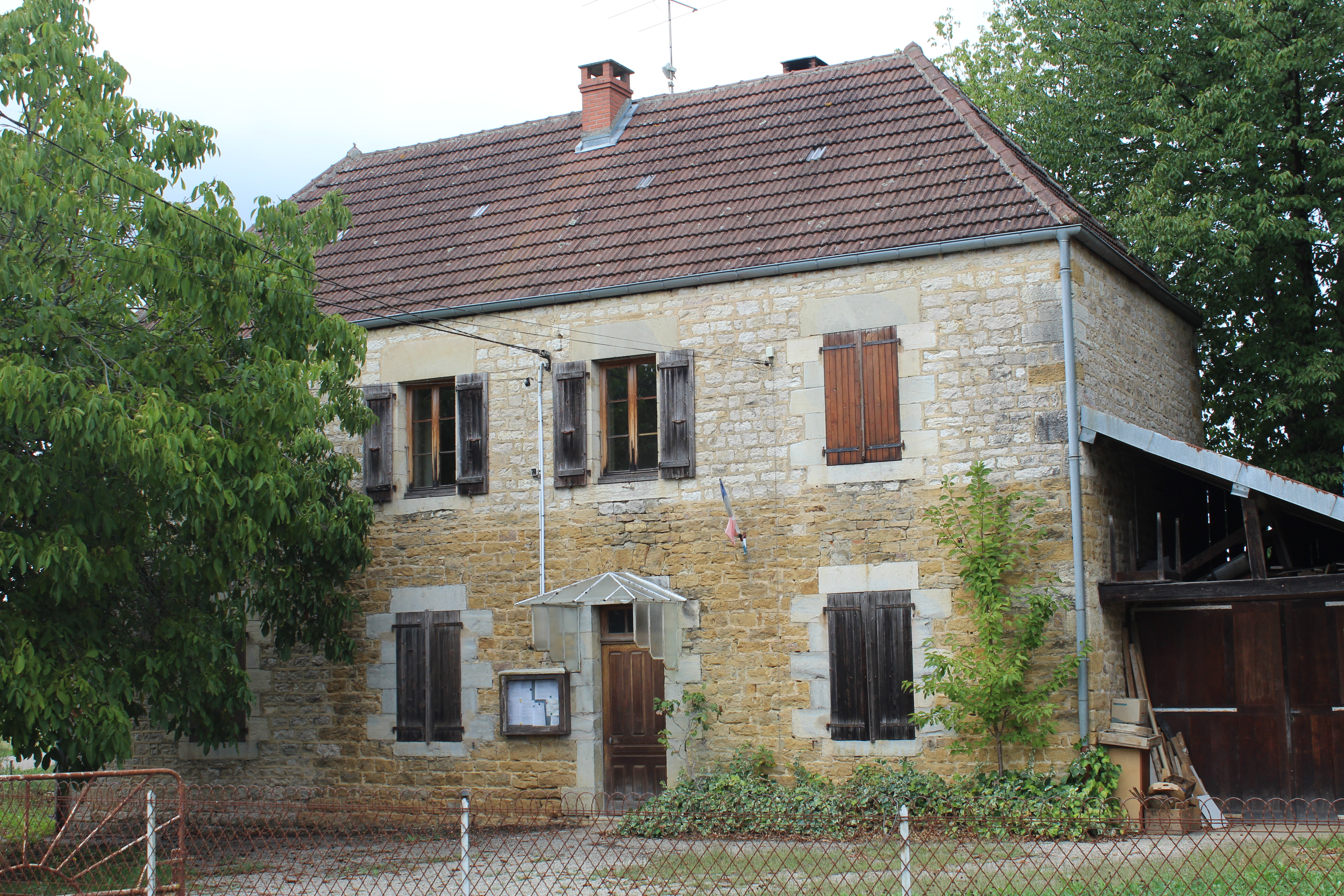
- The town hall in Le Chateley
- Location of Le Chateley
- Location within France Location within Bourgogne-Franche-Comté
- Coordinates: 46°52′39″N 5°33′16″E
- Country: France
- Region: Bourgogne-Franche-Comté
- Department: Jura
- Arrondissement: Dole
- Canton: Bletterans

Government
  - Mayor (2020–2026): Michel Laniesse
- Area^{1}: 4.67 km^{2} (1.80 sq mi)
- Highest elevation: 231 m (758 ft)
- Lowest elevation: 209 m (686 ft)
- Population (2023): 86
  - Density: 18/km^{2} (48/sq mi)
- Time zone: UTC+01:00 (CET)
  - Summer (DST): UTC+02:00 (CEST)
- INSEE/Postal code: 39119 /39230
- ^{1} French Land Register data, which excludes lakes, ponds, glaciers > 1 km^{2} (0.386 sq mi or 247 acres) and river estuaries.

Le Chateley (French pronunciation: [lə ʃatlɛ]) is a commune in the Jura department in Bourgogne-Franche-Comté in eastern France.

== Population ==
Historical population
Year	Pop.	±% p.a.
1968	67	—
1975	57	−2.28%
1982	73	+3.60%
1990	77	+0.67%
1999	77	+0.00%
2007	83	+0.94%
2012	88	+1.18%
2017	87	−0.23%
2023	86	−0.19%
Source: INSEE

== See also ==
- Communes of the Jura department
