= Sergenaux =

- Commune
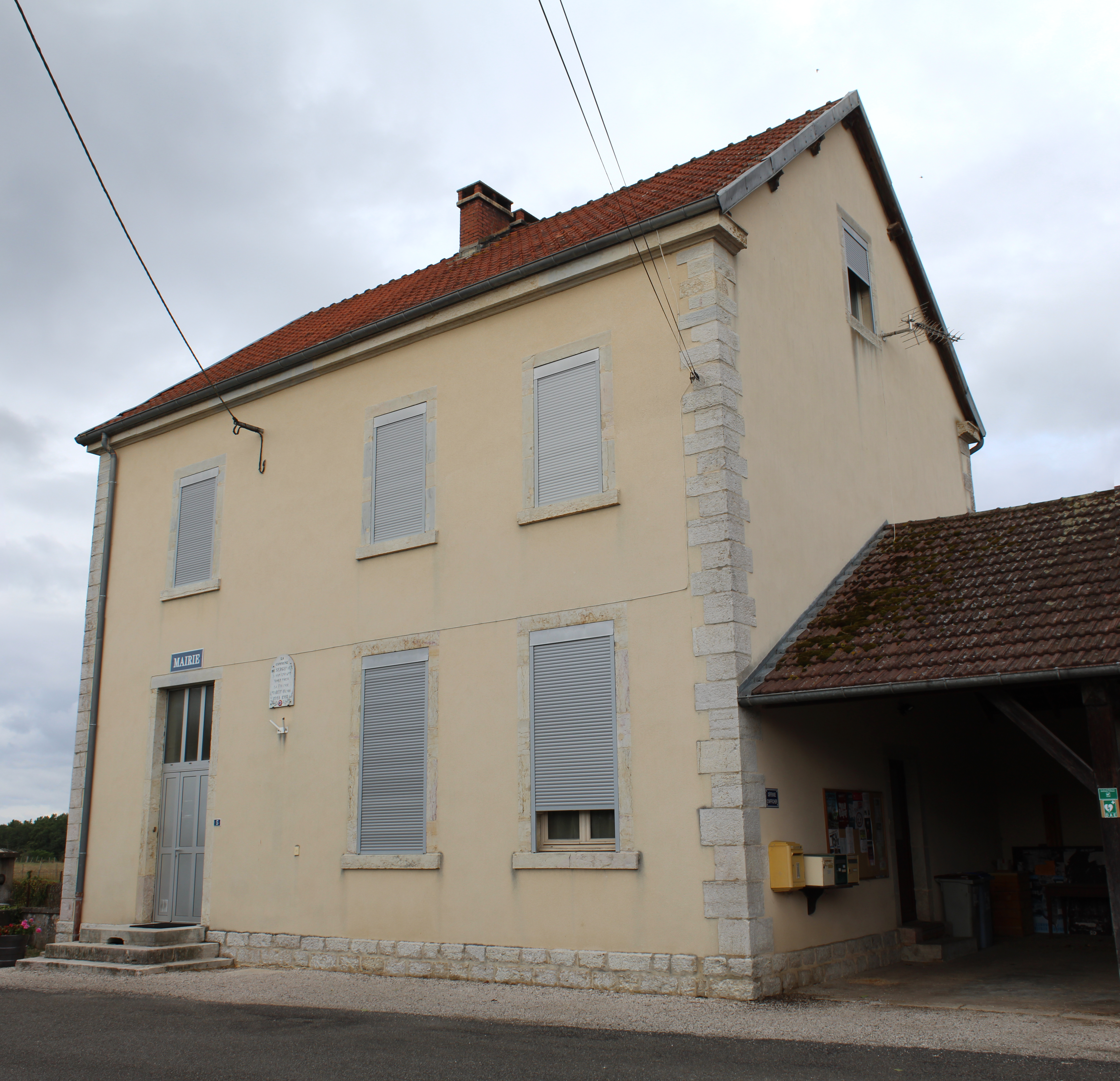
- The town hall in Sergenaux
- Location of Sergenaux
- Location within France Location within Bourgogne-Franche-Comté
- Coordinates: 46°53′15″N 5°27′29″E
- Country: France
- Region: Bourgogne-Franche-Comté
- Department: Jura
- Arrondissement: Lons-le-Saunier
- Canton: Bletterans

Government
  - Mayor (2020–2026): Jean Bacheley
- Area^{1}: 3.24 km^{2} (1.25 sq mi)
- Highest elevation: 221 m (725 ft)
- Lowest elevation: 197 m (646 ft)
- Population (2023): 65
  - Density: 20/km^{2} (52/sq mi)
- Time zone: UTC+01:00 (CET)
  - Summer (DST): UTC+02:00 (CEST)
- INSEE/Postal code: 39511 /39230
- ^{1} French Land Register data, which excludes lakes, ponds, glaciers > 1 km^{2} (0.386 sq mi or 247 acres) and river estuaries.

Sergenaux (French pronunciation: [sɛʁʒəno]) is a commune in the Jura department in the Bourgogne-Franche-Comté region in eastern France.

== Population ==
Historical population
Year	Pop.	±% p.a.
1968	77	—
1975	54	−4.94%
1982	50	−1.09%
1990	33	−5.06%
1999	35	+0.66%
2007	54	+5.57%
2012	72	+5.92%
2017	65	−2.02%
2023	65	+0.00%
Source: INSEE

== See also ==
- Communes of the Jura department
