= Champrougier =

Commune in Bourgogne-Franche-Comté, France

- Commune
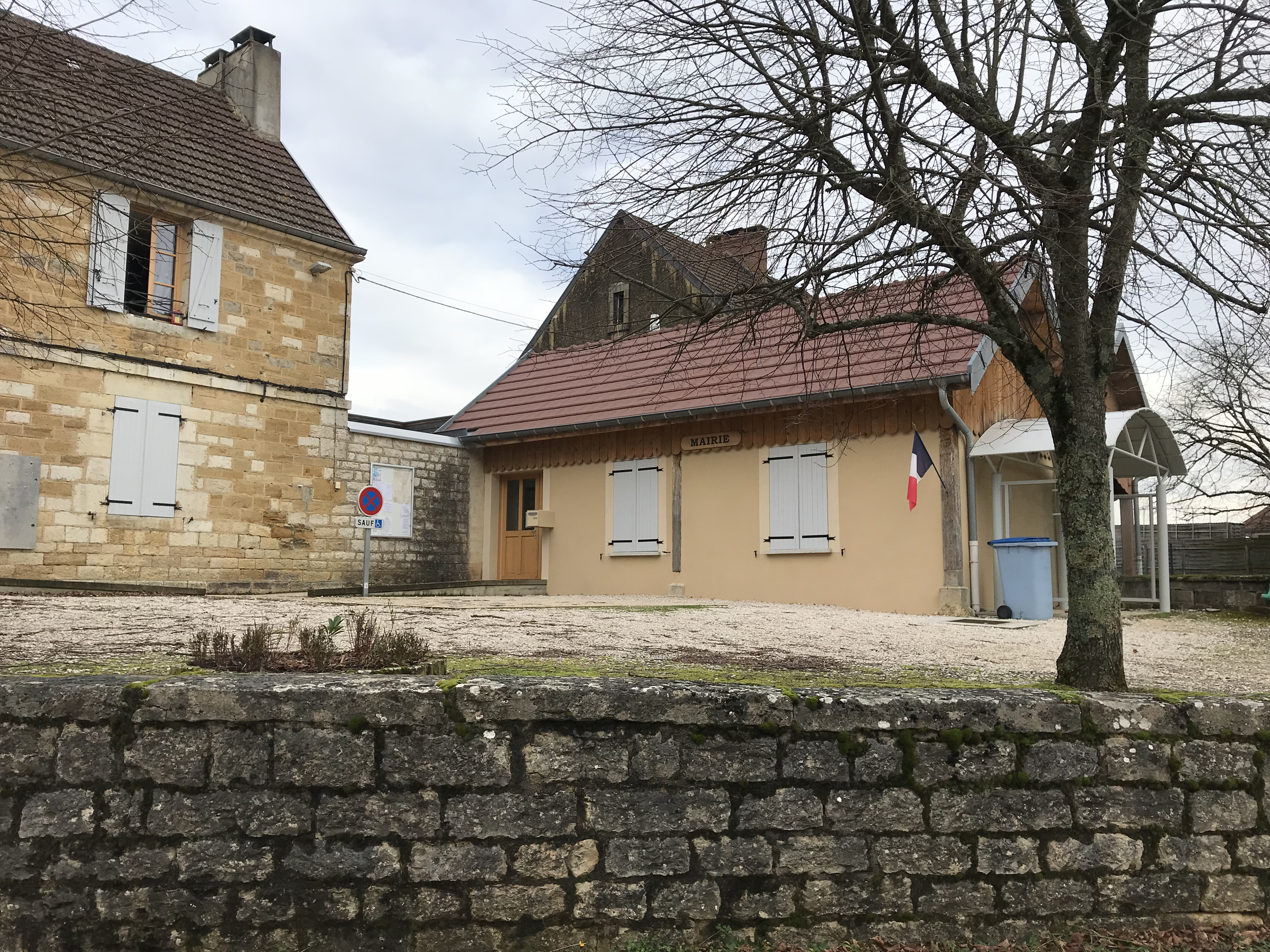
- The town hall in Champrougier
- Location of Champrougier
- Location within France Location within Bourgogne-Franche-Comté
- Coordinates: 46°52′21″N 5°31′24″E
- Country: France
- Region: Bourgogne-Franche-Comté
- Department: Jura
- Arrondissement: Lons-le-Saunier
- Canton: Bletterans

Government
  - Mayor (2020–2026): Hervé Gimaret
- Area^{1}: 8.73 km^{2} (3.37 sq mi)
- Highest elevation: 226 m (741 ft)
- Lowest elevation: 202 m (663 ft)
- Population (2023): 95
  - Density: 11/km^{2} (28/sq mi)
- Time zone: UTC+01:00 (CET)
  - Summer (DST): UTC+02:00 (CEST)
- INSEE/Postal code: 39100 /39230
- ^{1} French Land Register data, which excludes lakes, ponds, glaciers > 1 km^{2} (0.386 sq mi or 247 acres) and river estuaries.

Champrougier (French pronunciation: [ʃɑ̃pʁuʒje]) is a commune in the Jura department in Bourgogne-Franche-Comté in eastern France.

== Population ==
Historical population
Year	Pop.	±% p.a.
1968	103	—
1975	82	−3.20%
1982	84	+0.34%
1990	99	+2.08%
1999	104	+0.55%
2007	98	−0.74%
2012	90	−1.69%
2017	101	+2.33%
2023	95	−1.02%
Source: INSEE

== See also ==
- Communes of the Jura department
