= Neuvilley =

Commune in Bourgogne-Franche-Comté, France

- Commune
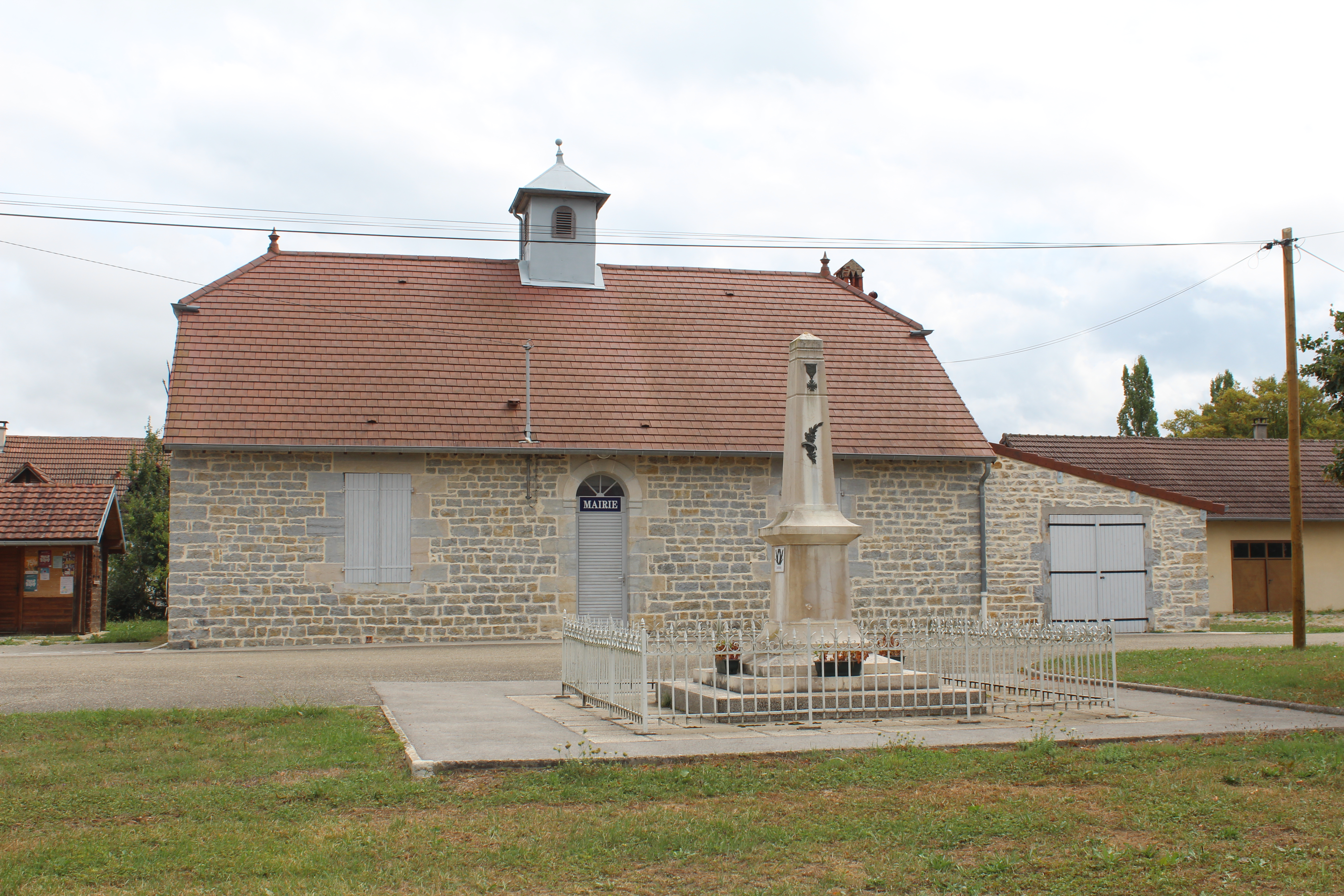
- The town hall in Neuvilley
- Location of Neuvilley
- Location within France Location within Bourgogne-Franche-Comté
- Coordinates: 46°53′55″N 5°35′41″E
- Country: France
- Region: Bourgogne-Franche-Comté
- Department: Jura
- Arrondissement: Dole
- Canton: Bletterans

Government
  - Mayor (2020–2026): Colette Girard
- Area^{1}: 4.07 km^{2} (1.57 sq mi)
- Highest elevation: 252 m (827 ft)
- Lowest elevation: 222 m (728 ft)
- Population (2023): 87
  - Density: 21/km^{2} (55/sq mi)
- Time zone: UTC+01:00 (CET)
  - Summer (DST): UTC+02:00 (CEST)
- INSEE/Postal code: 39386 /39800
- ^{1} French Land Register data, which excludes lakes, ponds, glaciers > 1 km^{2} (0.386 sq mi or 247 acres) and river estuaries.

Neuvilley is a commune in the Jura department in Bourgogne-Franche-Comté in eastern France.

== Population ==
Historical population
Year	Pop.	±% p.a.
1968	56	—
1975	55	−0.26%
1982	50	−1.35%
1990	52	+0.49%
1999	47	−1.12%
2007	62	+3.52%
2012	80	+5.23%
2017	87	+1.69%
2023	87	+0.00%
Source: INSEE

== See also ==
- Communes of the Jura department
