= Oussières =

Commune in Bourgogne-Franche-Comté, France

- Commune
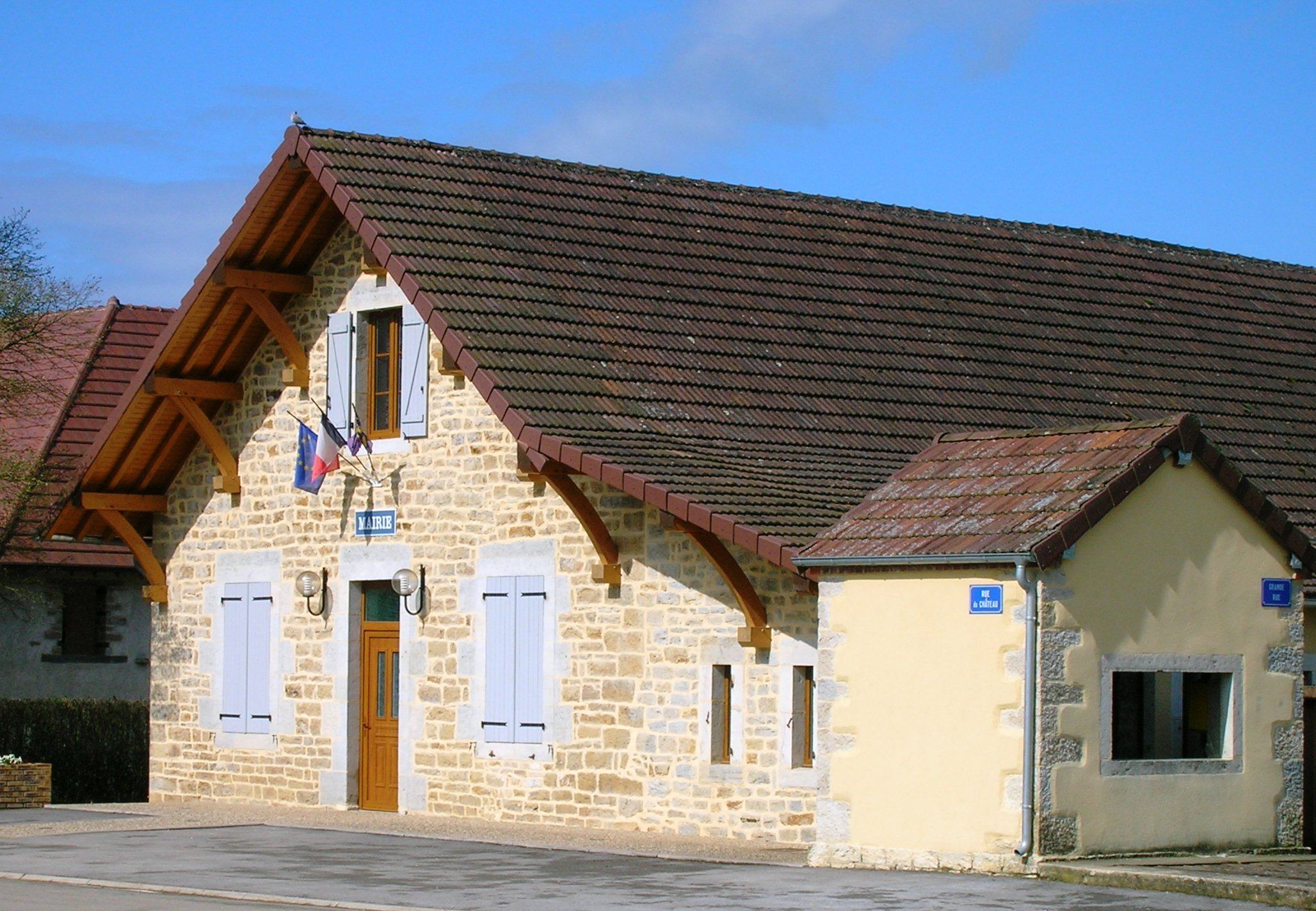
- Town hall
- Location of Oussières
- Location within France Location within Bourgogne-Franche-Comté
- Coordinates: 46°54′30″N 5°35′22″E
- Country: France
- Region: Bourgogne-Franche-Comté
- Department: Jura
- Arrondissement: Dole
- Canton: Bletterans

Government
  - Mayor (2020–2026): Jean-Luc Letondor
- Area^{1}: 7.54 km^{2} (2.91 sq mi)
- Highest elevation: 254 m (833 ft)
- Lowest elevation: 220 m (720 ft)
- Population (2023): 237
  - Density: 31.4/km^{2} (81.4/sq mi)
- Time zone: UTC+01:00 (CET)
  - Summer (DST): UTC+02:00 (CEST)
- INSEE/Postal code: 39401 /39800
- ^{1} French Land Register data, which excludes lakes, ponds, glaciers > 1 km^{2} (0.386 sq mi or 247 acres) and river estuaries.

Oussières (French pronunciation: [usjɛʁ]) is a commune in the Jura department in Bourgogne-Franche-Comté in eastern France.

== Population ==
Historical population
Year	Pop.	±% p.a.
1968	238	—
1975	226	−0.74%
1982	235	+0.56%
1990	246	+0.57%
1999	222	−1.13%
2007	221	−0.06%
2012	234	+1.15%
2017	233	−0.09%
2023	237	+0.28%
Source: INSEE

== See also ==
- Communes of the Jura department
