= Francheville, Jura =

Commune in Bourgogne-Franche-Comté, France

Francheville
- Commune
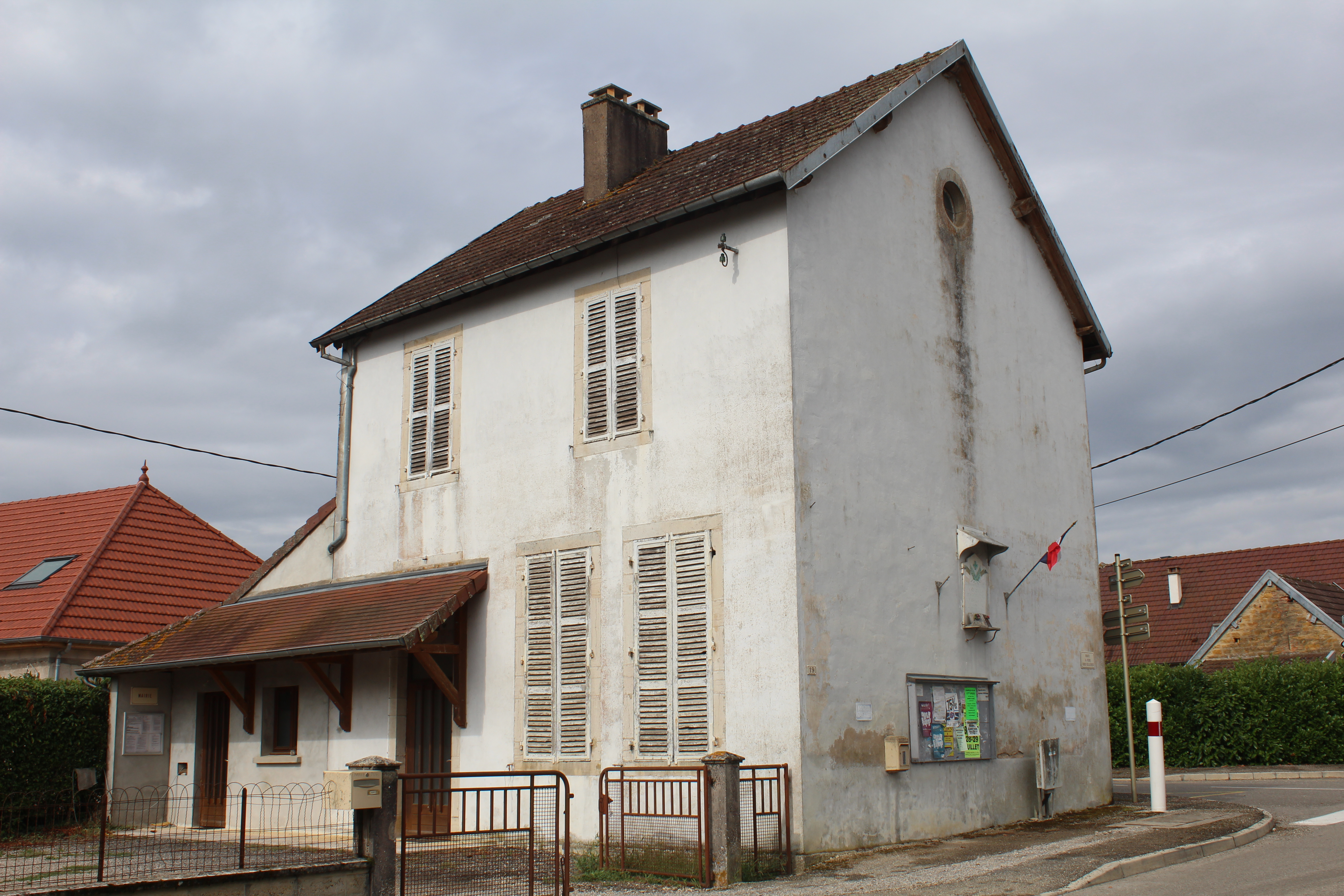
- The town hall in Francheville
- Location of Francheville
- Location within France Location within Bourgogne-Franche-Comté
- Coordinates: 46°50′21″N 5°30′00″E
- Country: France
- Region: Bourgogne-Franche-Comté
- Department: Jura
- Arrondissement: Lons-le-Saunier
- Canton: Bletterans

Government
  - Mayor (2020–2026): Patrice Bonnot
- Area^{1}: 1.46 km^{2} (0.56 sq mi)
- Highest elevation: 223 m (732 ft)
- Lowest elevation: 203 m (666 ft)
- Population (2023): 39
  - Density: 27/km^{2} (69/sq mi)
- Time zone: UTC+01:00 (CET)
  - Summer (DST): UTC+02:00 (CEST)
- INSEE/Postal code: 39236 /39230
- ^{1} French Land Register data, which excludes lakes, ponds, glaciers > 1 km^{2} (0.386 sq mi or 247 acres) and river estuaries.

Francheville (French pronunciation: [fʁɑ̃ʃvil]) is a commune in the Jura department in Bourgogne-Franche-Comté in eastern France.

== Population ==
Historical population
Year	Pop.	±% p.a.
1968	39	—
1975	36	−1.14%
1982	27	−4.03%
1990	26	−0.47%
1999	26	+0.00%
2007	38	+4.86%
2012	40	+1.03%
2017	55	+6.58%
2023	39	−5.57%
Source: INSEE

== See also ==
- Communes of the Jura department
