= Les Deux-Fays =

Commune in Bourgogne-Franche-Comté, France

- Commune
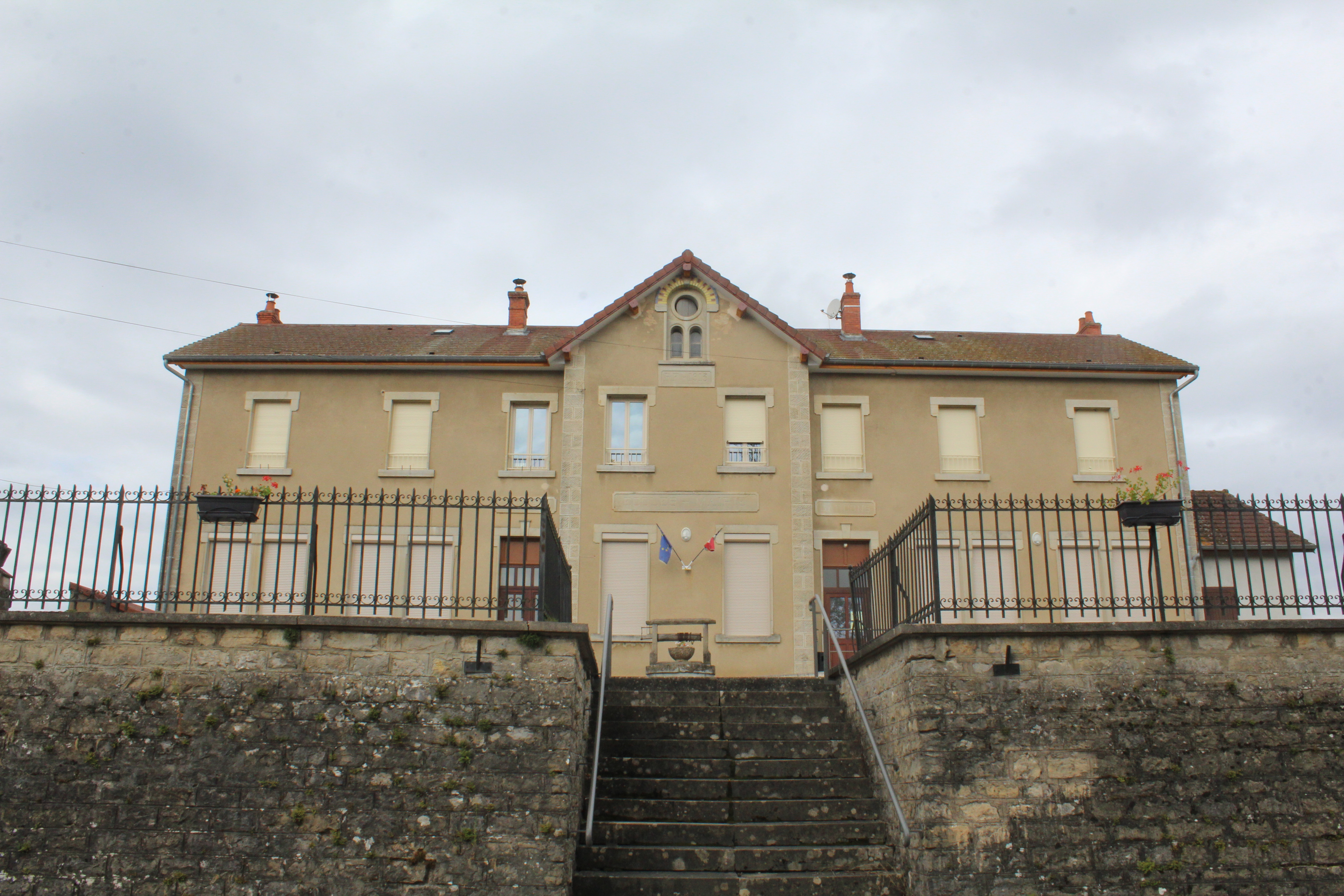
- The town hall in Les Deux-Fays
- Location of Les Deux-Fays
- Location within France Location within Bourgogne-Franche-Comté
- Coordinates: 46°52′59″N 5°28′59″E
- Country: France
- Region: Bourgogne-Franche-Comté
- Department: Jura
- Arrondissement: Lons-le-Saunier
- Canton: Bletterans

Government
  - Mayor (2020–2026): Arnaud Richard
- Area^{1}: 6.77 km^{2} (2.61 sq mi)
- Highest elevation: 226 m (741 ft)
- Lowest elevation: 200 m (660 ft)
- Population (2023): 118
  - Density: 17.4/km^{2} (45.1/sq mi)
- Time zone: UTC+01:00 (CET)
  - Summer (DST): UTC+02:00 (CEST)
- INSEE/Postal code: 39196 /39230
- ^{1} French Land Register data, which excludes lakes, ponds, glaciers > 1 km^{2} (0.386 sq mi or 247 acres) and river estuaries.

Les Deux-Fays (French pronunciation: [le dø fɛ]) is a commune in the Jura department in Bourgogne-Franche-Comté in eastern France.

== Population ==
Historical population
Year	Pop.	±% p.a.
1968	175	—
1975	146	−2.56%
1982	131	−1.54%
1990	125	−0.58%
1999	115	−0.92%
2007	120	+0.53%
2012	107	−2.27%
2017	106	−0.19%
2023	118	+1.80%
Source: INSEE

== See also ==
- Communes of the Jura department
