= Barretaine =

Commune in Bourgogne-Franche-Comté, France

- Commune
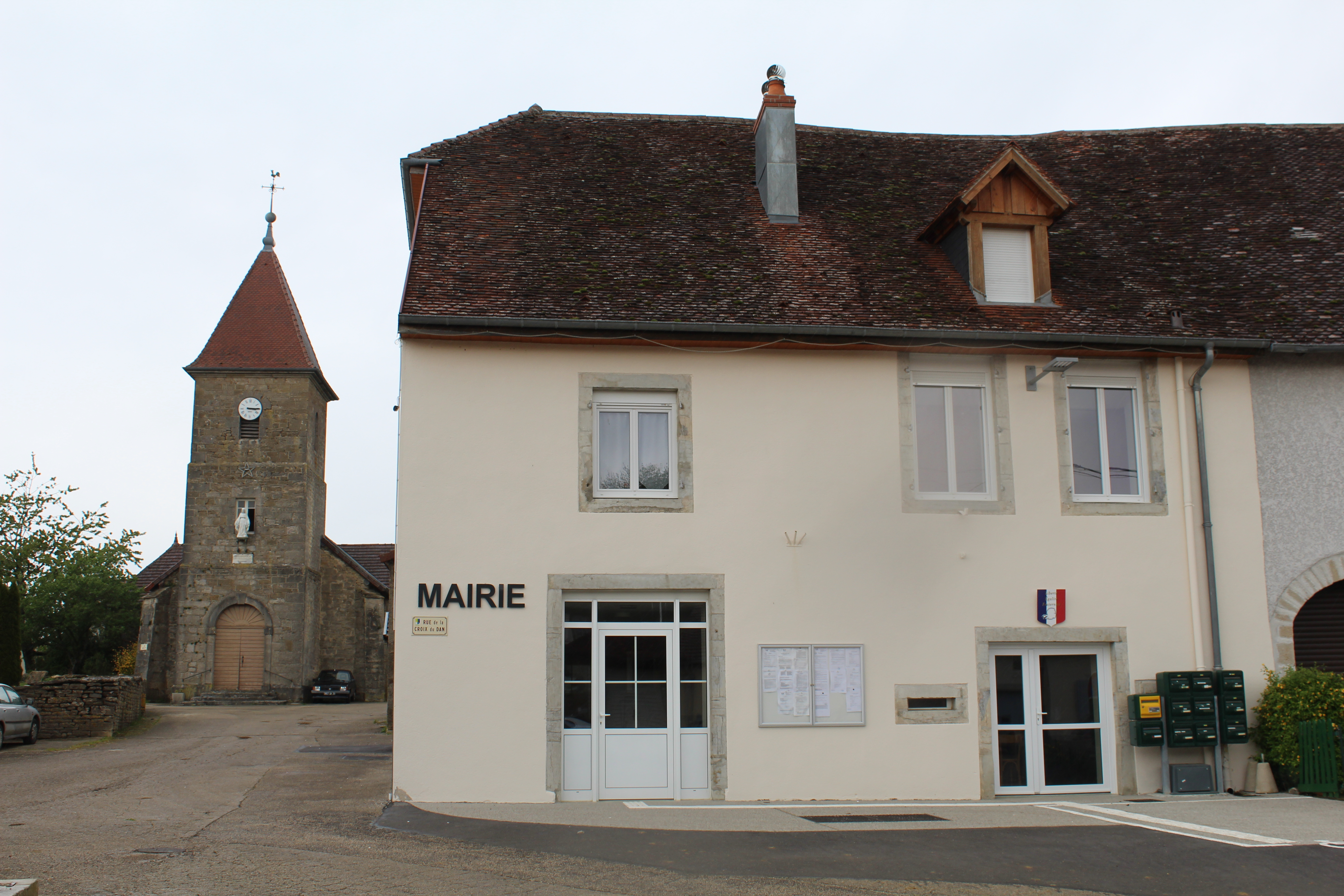
- The town hall in Barretaine
- Location of Barretaine
- Location within France Location within Bourgogne-Franche-Comté
- Coordinates: 46°49′15″N 5°42′37″E
- Country: France
- Region: Bourgogne-Franche-Comté
- Department: Jura
- Arrondissement: Dole
- Canton: Bletterans

Government
  - Mayor (2020–2026): Sandrine Tonnaire
- Area^{1}: 9.23 km^{2} (3.56 sq mi)
- Highest elevation: 591 m (1,939 ft)
- Lowest elevation: 471 m (1,545 ft)
- Population (2023): 199
  - Density: 21.6/km^{2} (55.8/sq mi)
- Time zone: UTC+01:00 (CET)
  - Summer (DST): UTC+02:00 (CEST)
- INSEE/Postal code: 39040 /39800
- ^{1} French Land Register data, which excludes lakes, ponds, glaciers > 1 km^{2} (0.386 sq mi or 247 acres) and river estuaries.

Barretaine (French pronunciation: [baʁtɛn]) is a commune in the Jura department in the region of Bourgogne-Franche-Comté in eastern France.

== Population ==
Historical population
Year	Pop.	±% p.a.
1968	215	—
1975	215	+0.00%
1982	200	−1.03%
1990	199	−0.06%
1999	199	+0.00%
2007	198	−0.06%
2012	184	−1.46%
2017	178	−0.66%
2023	199	+1.88%
Source: INSEE

== See also ==
- Communes of the Jura department
