= Monay =

Commune in Bourgogne-Franche-Comté, France

- Commune
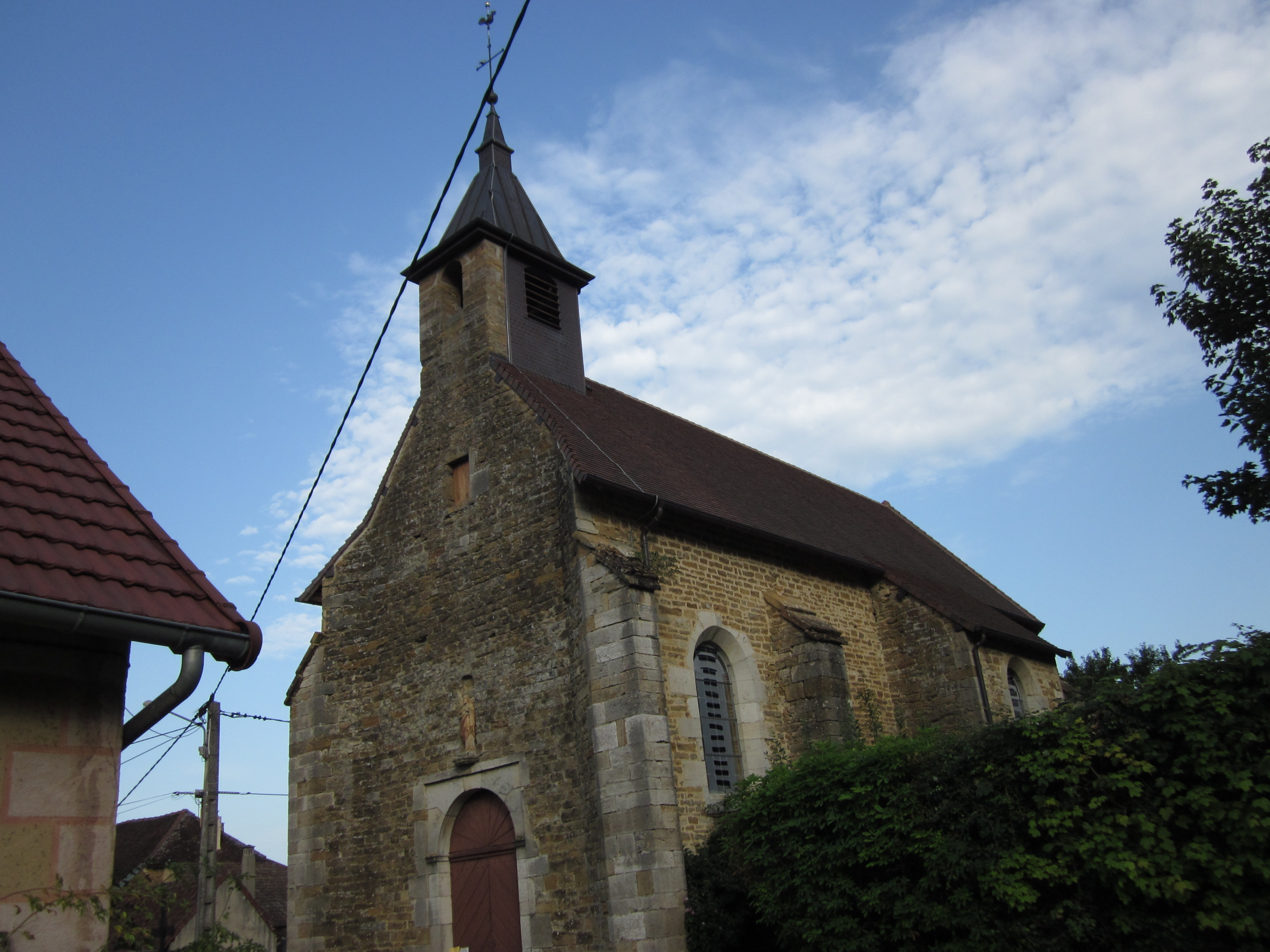
- The church in Monay
- Location of Monay
- Location within France Location within Bourgogne-Franche-Comté
- Coordinates: 46°50′15″N 5°35′44″E
- Country: France
- Region: Bourgogne-Franche-Comté
- Department: Jura
- Arrondissement: Dole
- Canton: Bletterans

Government
  - Mayor (2020–2026): Nelly Buys
- Area^{1}: 2.50 km^{2} (0.97 sq mi)
- Highest elevation: 347 m (1,138 ft)
- Lowest elevation: 235 m (771 ft)
- Population (2023): 123
  - Density: 49.2/km^{2} (127/sq mi)
- Time zone: UTC+01:00 (CET)
  - Summer (DST): UTC+02:00 (CEST)
- INSEE/Postal code: 39342 /39230
- ^{1} French Land Register data, which excludes lakes, ponds, glaciers > 1 km^{2} (0.386 sq mi or 247 acres) and river estuaries.

Monay (French pronunciation: [mɔnɛ]) is a commune in the Jura department in Bourgogne-Franche-Comté in eastern France.

== See also ==
- Communes of the Jura department
