= Chaumergy =

Commune in Bourgogne-Franche-Comté, France

- Commune
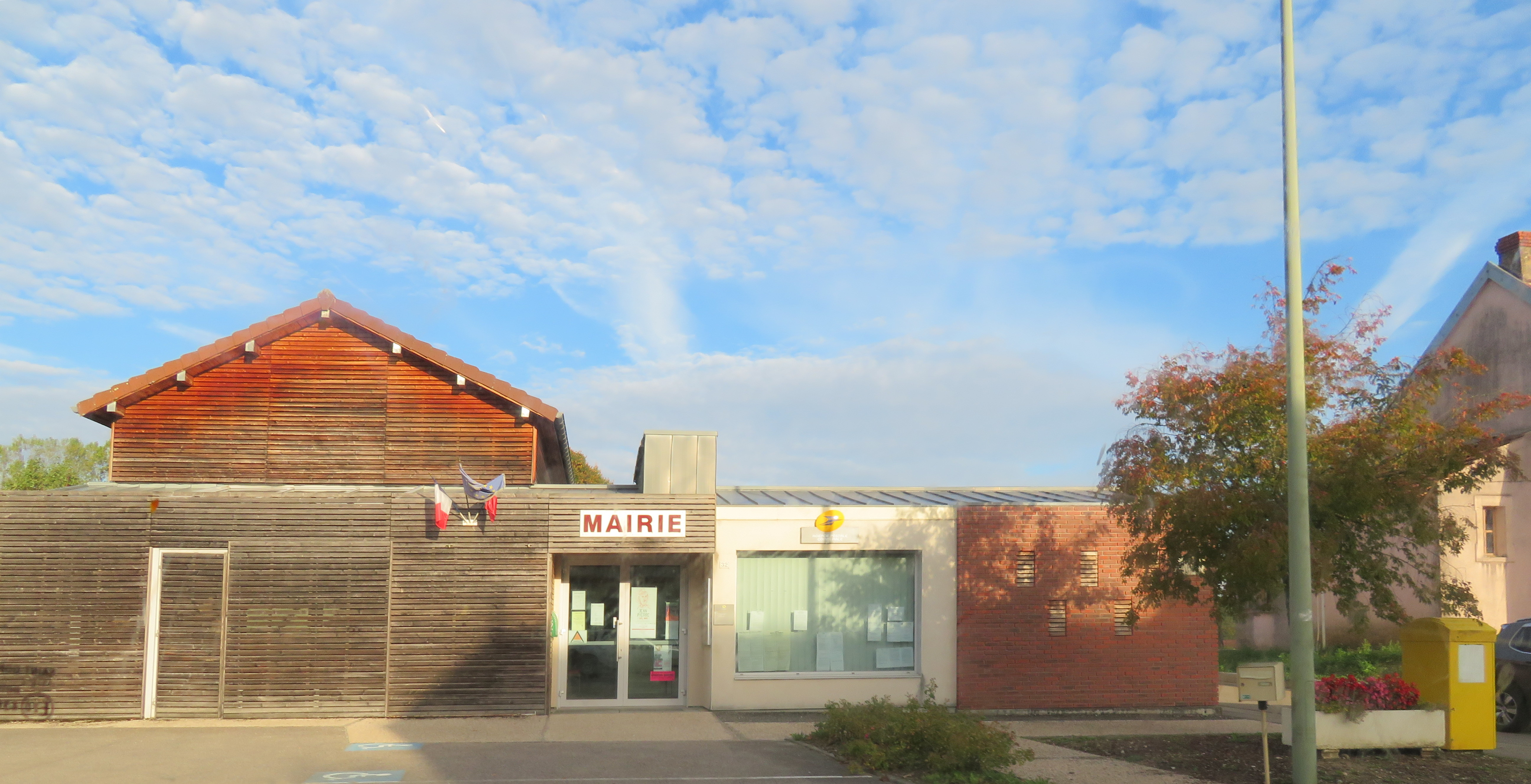
- The town hall in Chaumergy

- Coat of arms
- Location of Chaumergy
- Location within France Location within Bourgogne-Franche-Comté
- Coordinates: 46°50′49″N 5°28′42″E
- Country: France
- Region: Bourgogne-Franche-Comté
- Department: Jura
- Arrondissement: Lons-le-Saunier
- Canton: Bletterans

Government
  - Mayor (2020–2026): Joël Mornico
- Area^{1}: 6.14 km^{2} (2.37 sq mi)
- Highest elevation: 224 m (735 ft)
- Lowest elevation: 196 m (643 ft)
- Population (2023): 510
  - Density: 83/km^{2} (220/sq mi)
- Time zone: UTC+01:00 (CET)
  - Summer (DST): UTC+02:00 (CEST)
- INSEE/Postal code: 39124 /39230
- ^{1} French Land Register data, which excludes lakes, ponds, glaciers > 1 km^{2} (0.386 sq mi or 247 acres) and river estuaries.

Chaumergy (French pronunciation: [ʃomɛʁʒi]) is a commune in the Jura department in Bourgogne-Franche-Comté in eastern France.

== Population ==
Historical population
Year	Pop.	±% p.a.
1968	436	—
1975	377	−2.06%
1982	382	+0.19%
1990	398	+0.51%
1999	410	+0.33%
2007	457	+1.37%
2012	473	+0.69%
2017	482	+0.38%
2023	510	+0.95%
Source: INSEE

== See also ==
- Communes of the Jura department
