= Sellières =

- Commune
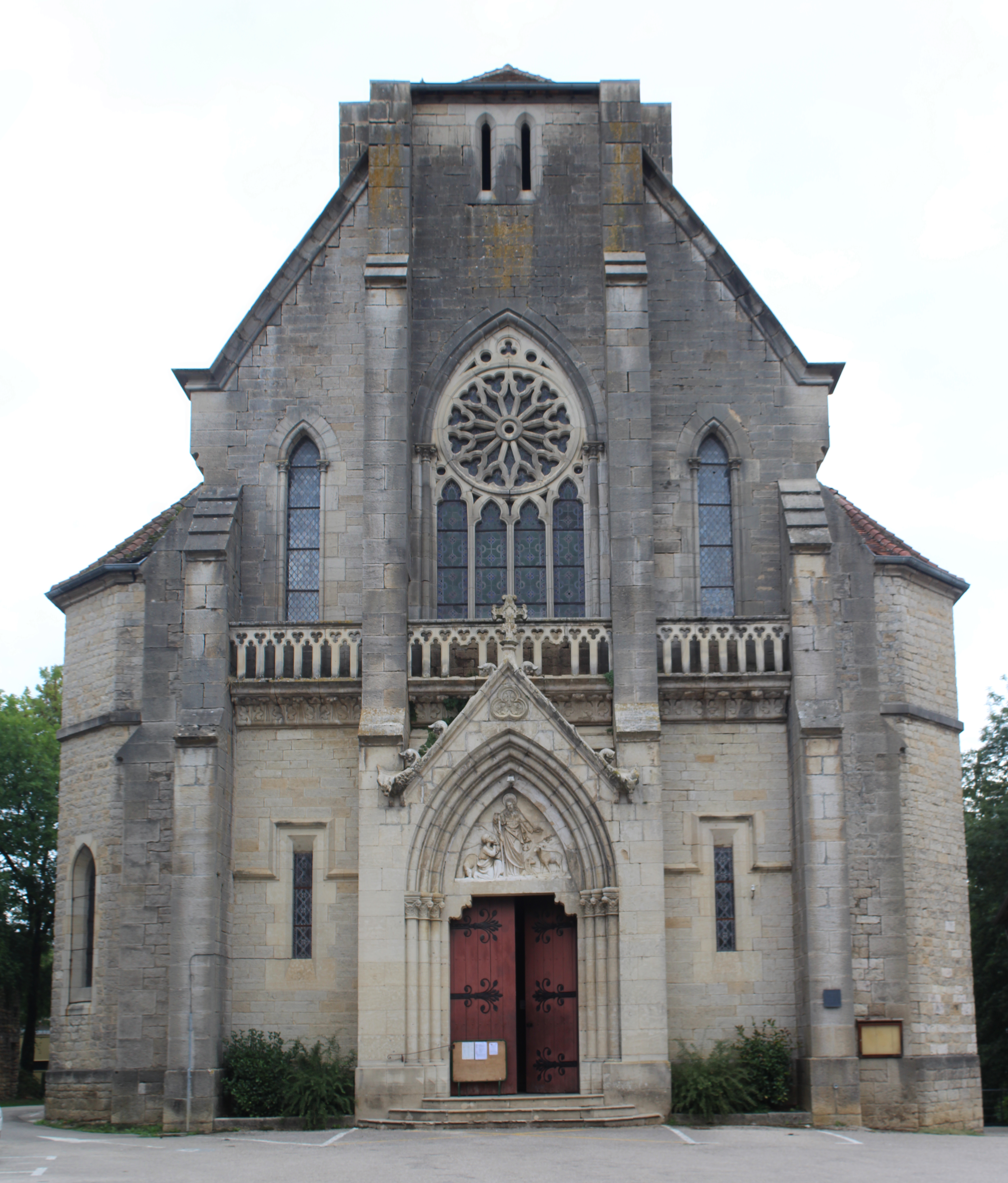
- The church in Sellières

- Coat of arms
- Location of Sellières
- Location within France Location within Bourgogne-Franche-Comté
- Coordinates: 46°49′43″N 5°33′51″E
- Country: France
- Region: Bourgogne-Franche-Comté
- Department: Jura
- Arrondissement: Lons-le-Saunier
- Canton: Bletterans

Government
  - Mayor (2023–2026): Hervé Perrodin
- Area^{1}: 9.90 km^{2} (3.82 sq mi)
- Highest elevation: 310 m (1,020 ft)
- Lowest elevation: 212 m (696 ft)
- Population (2023): 737
  - Density: 74.4/km^{2} (193/sq mi)
- Time zone: UTC+01:00 (CET)
  - Summer (DST): UTC+02:00 (CEST)
- INSEE/Postal code: 39508 /39230
- ^{1} French Land Register data, which excludes lakes, ponds, glaciers > 1 km^{2} (0.386 sq mi or 247 acres) and river estuaries.

Sellières (French pronunciation: [sɛljɛʁ]) is a commune in the Jura department in the Bourgogne-Franche-Comté region in eastern France.

== Population ==
Historical population
Year	Pop.	±% p.a.
1968	889	—
1975	835	−0.89%
1982	859	+0.41%
1990	799	−0.90%
1999	775	−0.34%
2007	822	+0.74%
2012	772	−1.25%
2017	744	−0.74%
2023	737	−0.16%
Source: INSEE

== See also ==
- Communes of the Jura department
