= Darbonnay =

Commune in Bourgogne-Franche-Comté, France

- Commune
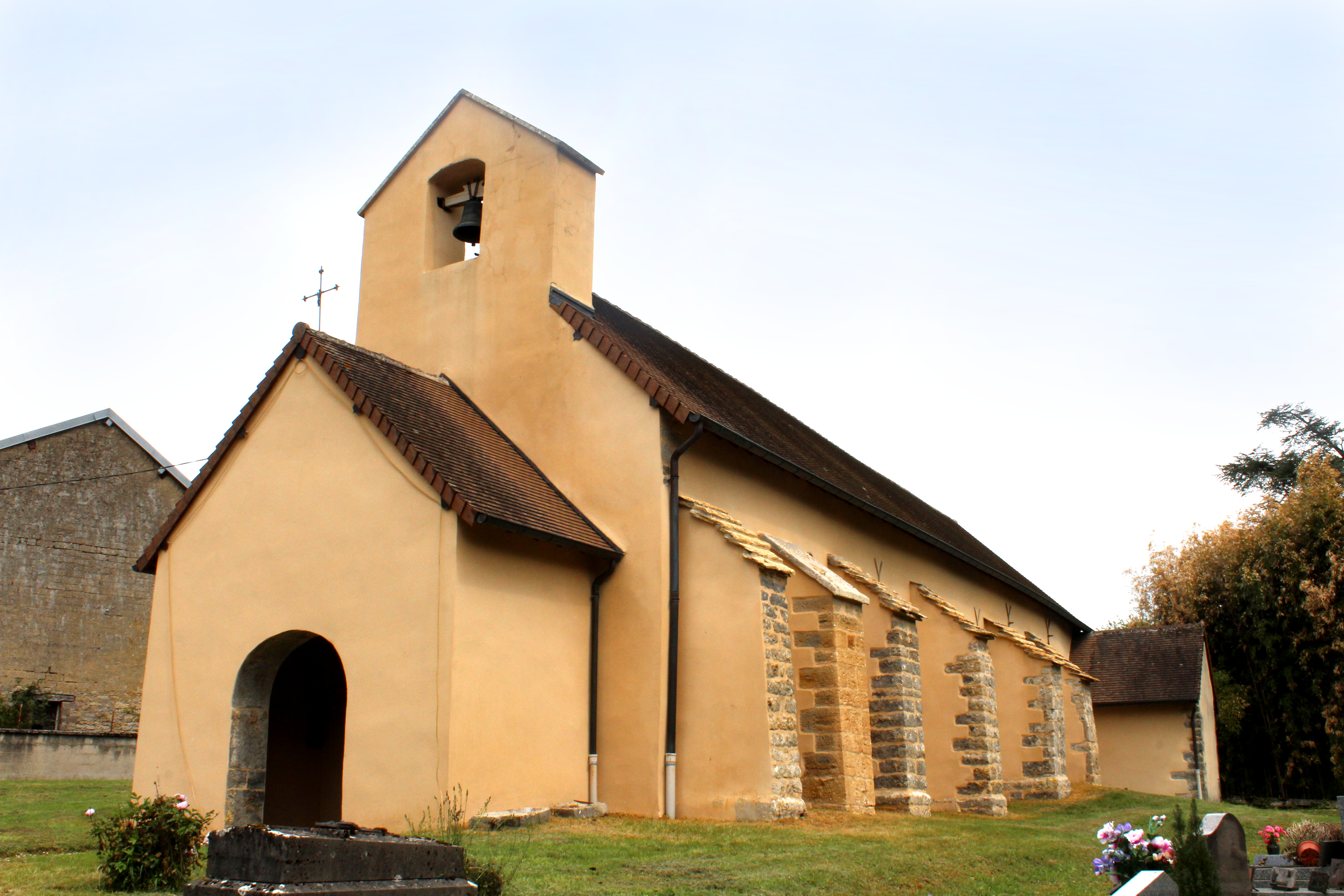
- The church in Darbonnay
- Location of Darbonnay
- Location within France Location within Bourgogne-Franche-Comté
- Coordinates: 46°49′01″N 5°36′18″E
- Country: France
- Region: Bourgogne-Franche-Comté
- Department: Jura
- Arrondissement: Dole
- Canton: Bletterans

Government
  - Mayor (2021–2026): Roger Chauvin
- Area^{1}: 4.39 km^{2} (1.69 sq mi)
- Highest elevation: 288 m (945 ft)
- Lowest elevation: 236 m (774 ft)
- Population (2023): 78
  - Density: 18/km^{2} (46/sq mi)
- Time zone: UTC+01:00 (CET)
  - Summer (DST): UTC+02:00 (CEST)
- INSEE/Postal code: 39191 /39230
- ^{1} French Land Register data, which excludes lakes, ponds, glaciers > 1 km^{2} (0.386 sq mi or 247 acres) and river estuaries.

Darbonnay (French pronunciation: [daʁbɔnɛ]) is a commune in the Jura department in Bourgogne-Franche-Comté in eastern France.

== Population ==
Historical population
| Year | Pop. | ±% p.a. |
|---|---|---|
| 1968 | 68 | — |
| 1975 | 70 | +0.41% |
| 1982 | 71 | +0.20% |
| 1990 | 77 | +1.02% |
| 1999 | 95 | +2.36% |
| 2007 | 83 | −1.67% |
| 2012 | 100 | +3.80% |
| 2017 | 92 | −1.65% |
| 2023 | 78 | −2.71% |
Source: INSEE

== See also ==
- Communes of the Jura department
