= Sergenon =

- Commune
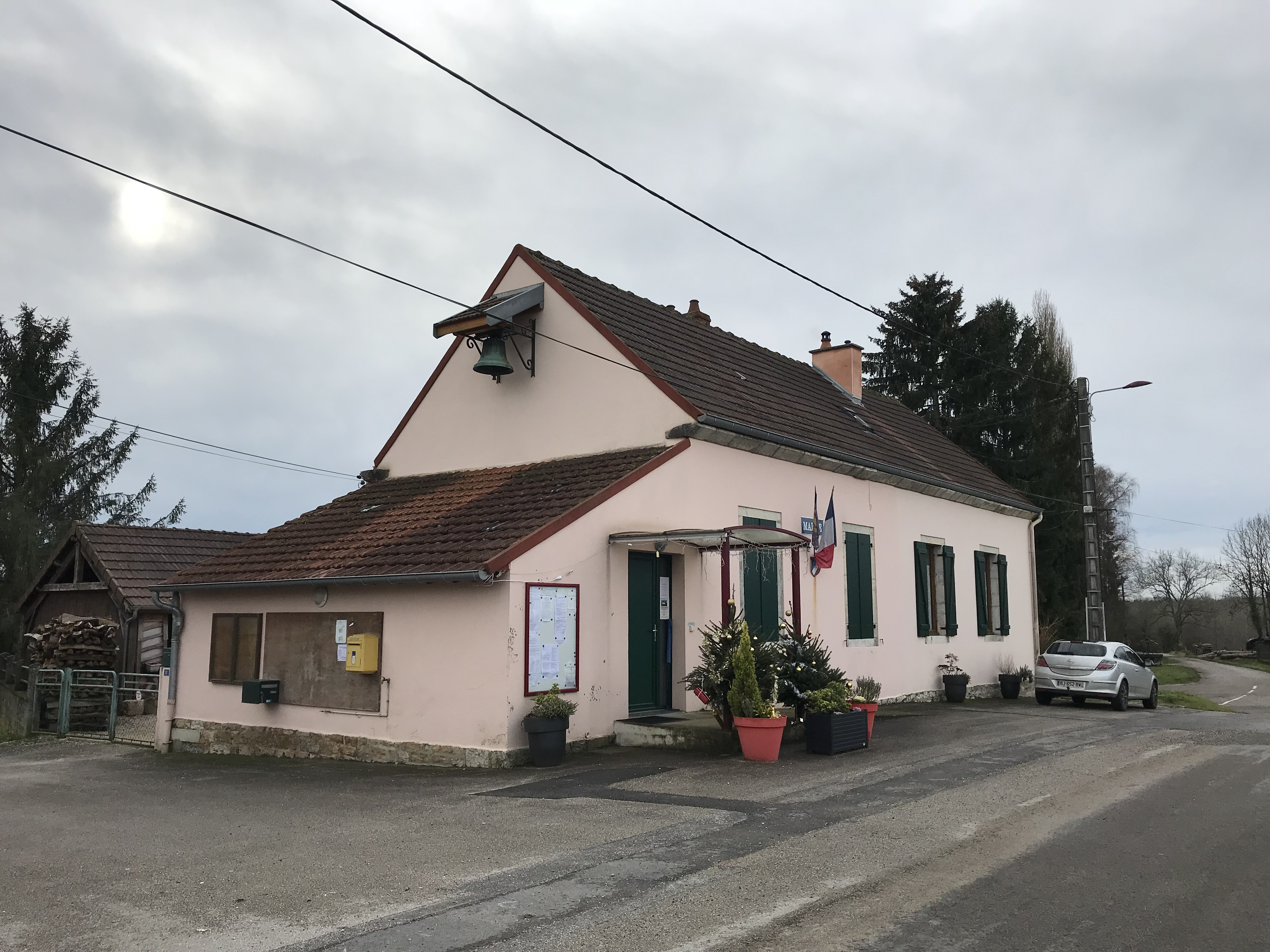
- The town hall in Sergenon
- Location of Sergenon
- Location within France Location within Bourgogne-Franche-Comté
- Coordinates: 46°54′17″N 5°27′26″E
- Country: France
- Region: Bourgogne-Franche-Comté
- Department: Jura
- Arrondissement: Lons-le-Saunier
- Canton: Bletterans

Government
  - Mayor (2020–2026): Mathilde Cyrot-Lalubin
- Area^{1}: 3.88 km^{2} (1.50 sq mi)
- Highest elevation: 222 m (728 ft)
- Lowest elevation: 196 m (643 ft)
- Population (2023): 58
  - Density: 15/km^{2} (39/sq mi)
- Time zone: UTC+01:00 (CET)
  - Summer (DST): UTC+02:00 (CEST)
- INSEE/Postal code: 39512 /39120
- ^{1} French Land Register data, which excludes lakes, ponds, glaciers > 1 km^{2} (0.386 sq mi or 247 acres) and river estuaries.

Sergenon (French pronunciation: [sɛʁʒənɔ̃]) is a commune in the Jura department in the Bourgogne-Franche-Comté region in eastern France.

== Population ==
Historical population
Year	Pop.	±% p.a.
1968	73	—
1975	45	−6.68%
1982	59	+3.95%
1990	49	−2.29%
1999	50	+0.22%
2007	37	−3.69%
2012	58	+9.41%
2017	52	−2.16%
2023	58	+1.84%
Source: INSEE

== See also ==
- Communes of the Jura department
