= Lac des Rouges Truites =

Lake in eastern France

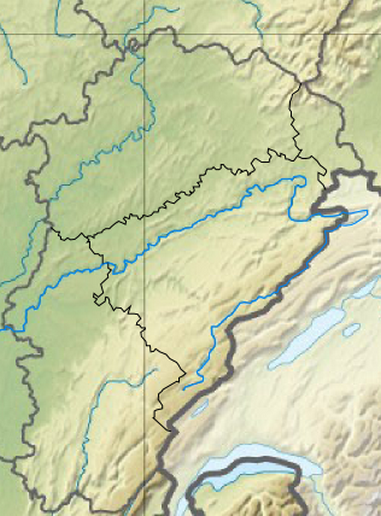
- Location within Franche-Comté
- Location: Jura department, Franche-Comté
- Coordinates: 46°36′31″N 6°0′22″E
- Basin countries: France

Lac des Rouges Truites (French pronunciation: [lak de ʁuʒ tʁɥit], literally Lake of the Red Trouts) is a lake at the village of Lac-des-Rouges-Truites in the Jura department of France.
