= Lac-des-Rouges-Truites =

Commune in Bourgogne-Franche-Comté, France

- Commune
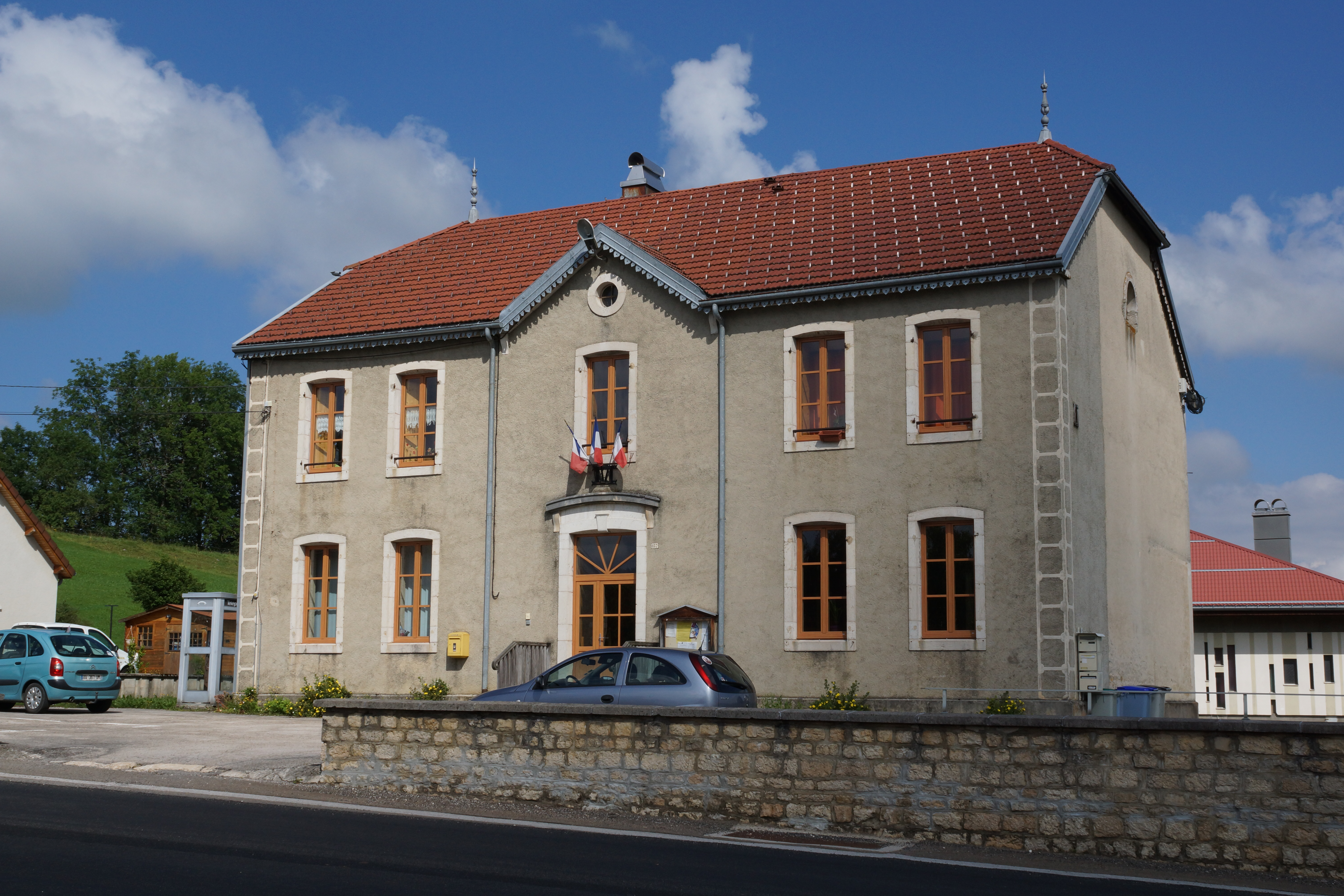
- Town hall
- Location of Lac-des-Rouges-Truites
- Location within France Location within Bourgogne-Franche-Comté
- Coordinates: 46°36′25″N 5°59′53″E
- Country: France
- Region: Bourgogne-Franche-Comté
- Department: Jura
- Arrondissement: Saint-Claude
- Canton: Saint-Laurent-en-Grandvaux

Government
  - Mayor (2020–2026): Jean Richard
- Area^{1}: 19.69 km^{2} (7.60 sq mi)
- Highest elevation: 1,181 m (3,875 ft)
- Lowest elevation: 829 m (2,720 ft)
- Population (2023): 397
  - Density: 20.2/km^{2} (52.2/sq mi)
- Time zone: UTC+01:00 (CET)
  - Summer (DST): UTC+02:00 (CEST)
- INSEE/Postal code: 39271 /39150
- ^{1} French Land Register data, which excludes lakes, ponds, glaciers > 1 km^{2} (0.386 sq mi or 247 acres) and river estuaries.

Lac-des-Rouges-Truites (French pronunciation: [lak de ʁuʒ tʁɥit]) is a commune in the Jura department in Bourgogne-Franche-Comté in eastern France. It takes its name from the lake in the commune: Lac des Rouges Truites.

== Population ==
Historical population
Year	Pop.	±% p.a.
1968	269	—
1975	237	−1.79%
1982	253	+0.94%
1990	294	+1.90%
1999	331	+1.33%
2007	349	+0.66%
2012	381	+1.77%
2017	394	+0.67%
2023	397	+0.13%
Source: INSEE

== See also ==
- Communes of the Jura department
