= Auxange =

Commune in Bourgogne-Franche-Comté, France

- Commune
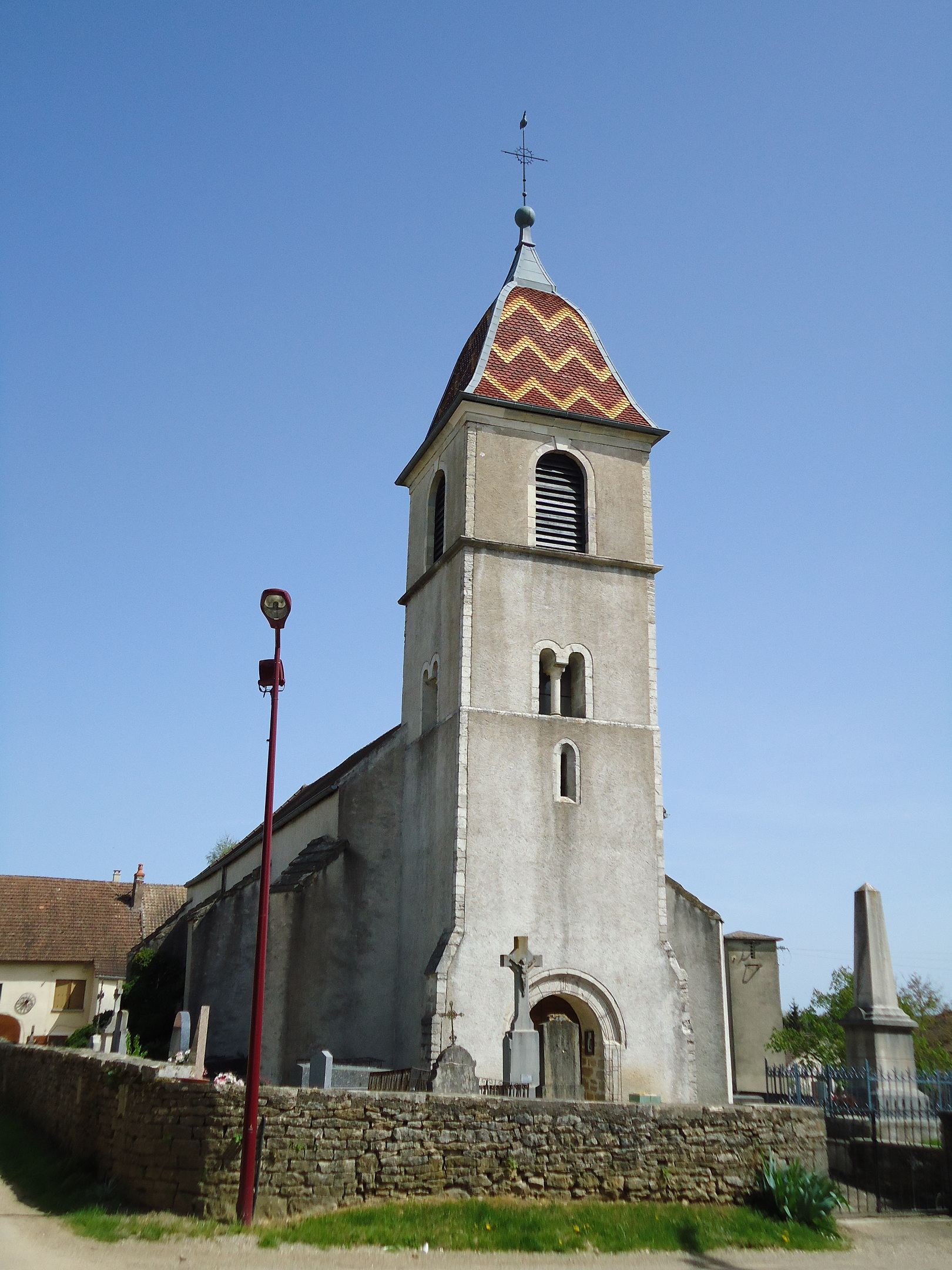
- The church in Auxange
- Location of Auxange
- Location within France Location within Bourgogne-Franche-Comté
- Coordinates: 47°10′30″N 5°39′03″E
- Country: France
- Region: Bourgogne-Franche-Comté
- Department: Jura
- Arrondissement: Dole
- Canton: Authume
- Intercommunality: CA Grand Dole

Government
  - Mayor (2020–2026): Jean-Claude Robert
- Area^{1}: 5.20 km^{2} (2.01 sq mi)
- Highest elevation: 271 m (889 ft)
- Lowest elevation: 212 m (696 ft)
- Population (2023): 198
  - Density: 38.1/km^{2} (98.6/sq mi)
- Time zone: UTC+01:00 (CET)
  - Summer (DST): UTC+02:00 (CEST)
- INSEE/Postal code: 39031 /39700
- ^{1} French Land Register data, which excludes lakes, ponds, glaciers > 1 km^{2} (0.386 sq mi or 247 acres) and river estuaries.

Auxange is a commune in the Jura department in the region of Bourgogne-Franche-Comté in eastern France.

== Population ==
Historical population
Year	Pop.	±% p.a.
1968	107	—
1975	105	−0.27%
1982	101	−0.55%
1990	123	+2.49%
1999	132	+0.79%
2007	171	+3.29%
2012	202	+3.39%
2017	201	−0.10%
2023	198	−0.25%
Source: INSEE

== See also ==
- Communes of the Jura department
