= Gendrey =

Commune in Bourgogne-Franche-Comté, France

- Commune
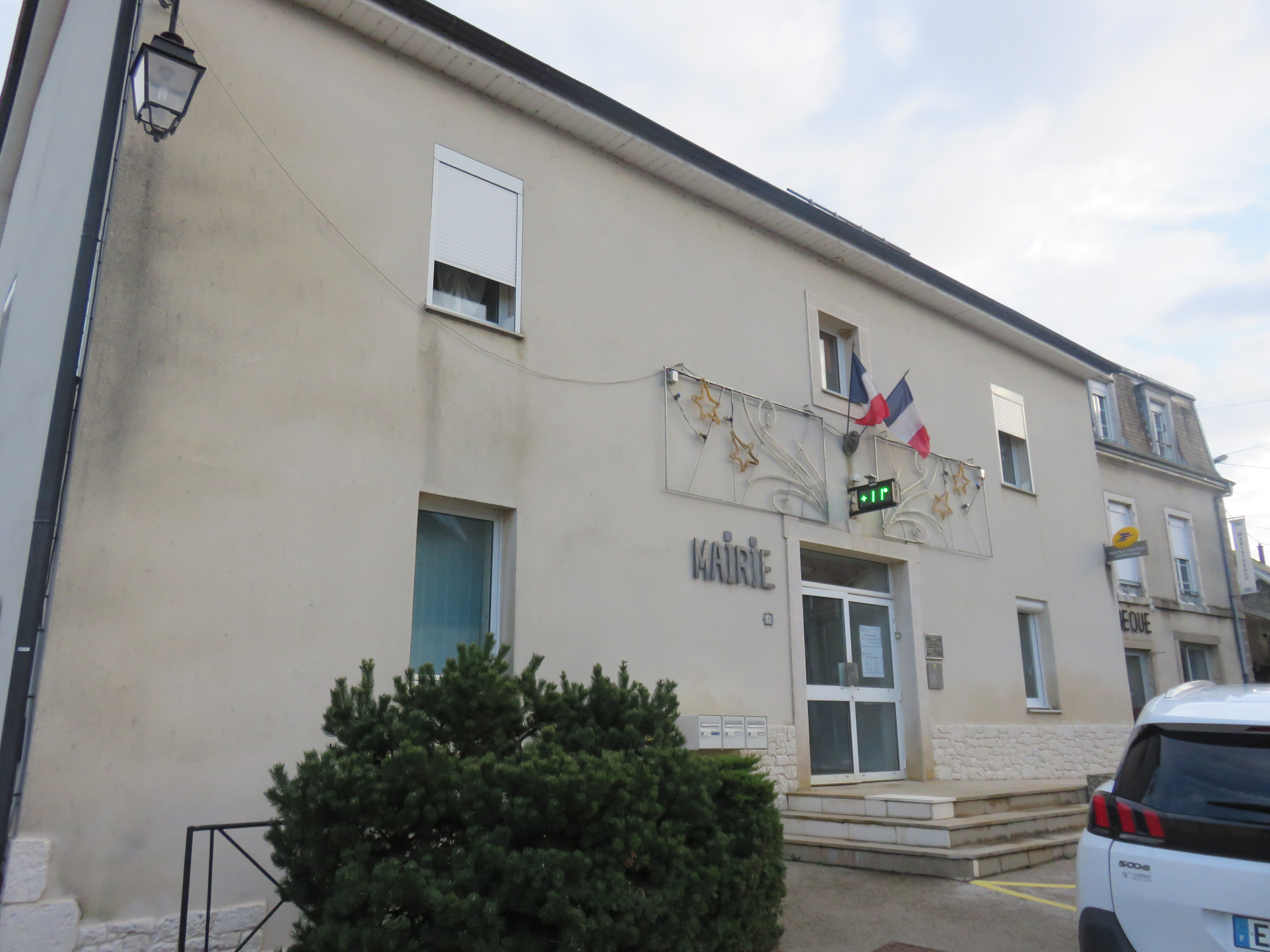
- The town hall in Gendrey

- Coat of arms
- Location of Gendrey
- Location within France Location within Bourgogne-Franche-Comté
- Coordinates: 47°12′21″N 5°41′08″E
- Country: France
- Region: Bourgogne-Franche-Comté
- Department: Jura
- Arrondissement: Dole
- Canton: Authume

Government
  - Mayor (2020–2026): Axelle Lereu-Lavry
- Area^{1}: 13.90 km^{2} (5.37 sq mi)
- Highest elevation: 371 m (1,217 ft)
- Lowest elevation: 222 m (728 ft)
- Population (2023): 436
  - Density: 31.4/km^{2} (81.2/sq mi)
- Time zone: UTC+01:00 (CET)
  - Summer (DST): UTC+02:00 (CEST)
- INSEE/Postal code: 39246 /39350
- ^{1} French Land Register data, which excludes lakes, ponds, glaciers > 1 km^{2} (0.386 sq mi or 247 acres) and river estuaries.

Gendrey (French pronunciation: [ʒɑ̃dʁɛ]) is a commune in the Jura department in Bourgogne-Franche-Comté in eastern France.

== Population ==
Historical population
Year	Pop.	±% p.a.
1968	256	—
1975	216	−2.40%
1982	222	+0.39%
1990	258	+1.90%
1999	310	+2.06%
2007	367	+2.13%
2012	401	+1.79%
2017	428	+1.31%
2023	436	+0.31%
Source: INSEE

== See also ==
- Communes of the Jura department
