= Serre-les-Moulières =

- Commune
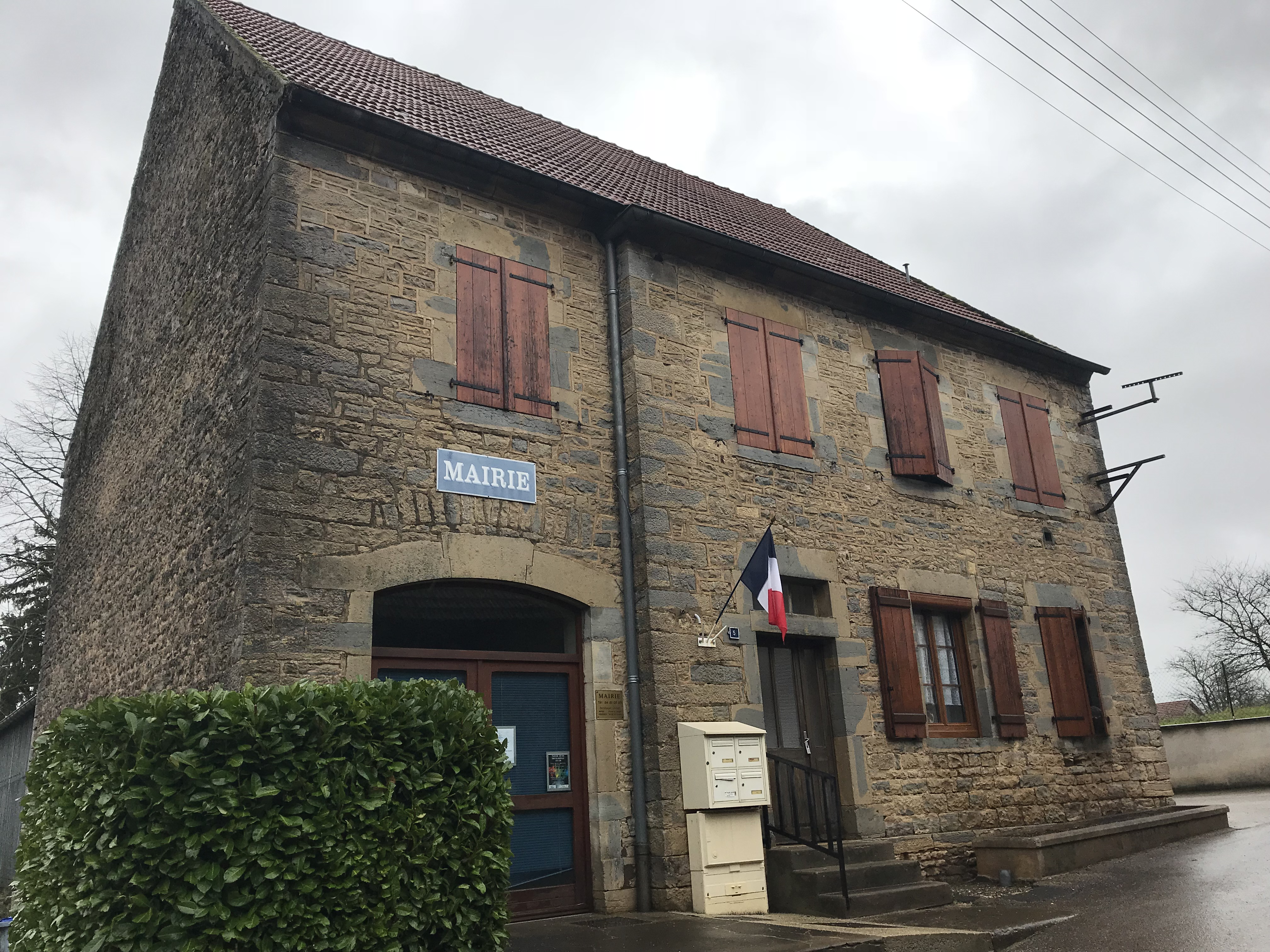
- The town hall in Serre-les-Moulières
- Location of Serre-les-Moulières
- Location within France Location within Bourgogne-Franche-Comté
- Coordinates: 47°12′21″N 5°37′03″E
- Country: France
- Region: Bourgogne-Franche-Comté
- Department: Jura
- Arrondissement: Dole
- Canton: Authume

Government
  - Mayor (2020–2026): Claude Téron
- Area^{1}: 5.67 km^{2} (2.19 sq mi)
- Highest elevation: 389 m (1,276 ft)
- Lowest elevation: 214 m (702 ft)
- Population (2023): 186
  - Density: 32.8/km^{2} (85.0/sq mi)
- Time zone: UTC+01:00 (CET)
  - Summer (DST): UTC+02:00 (CEST)
- INSEE/Postal code: 39514 /39700
- ^{1} French Land Register data, which excludes lakes, ponds, glaciers > 1 km^{2} (0.386 sq mi or 247 acres) and river estuaries.

Serre-les-Moulières (French pronunciation: [sɛʁ le muljɛʁ]) is a commune in the Jura department in the Bourgogne-Franche-Comté region in eastern France.

== Population ==
Historical population
Year	Pop.	±% p.a.
1968	122	—
1975	122	+0.00%
1982	137	+1.67%
1990	139	+0.18%
1999	141	+0.16%
2007	186	+3.52%
2012	186	+0.00%
2017	188	+0.21%
2023	186	−0.18%
Source: INSEE

== See also ==
- Communes of the Jura department
