= Vriange =

- Commune
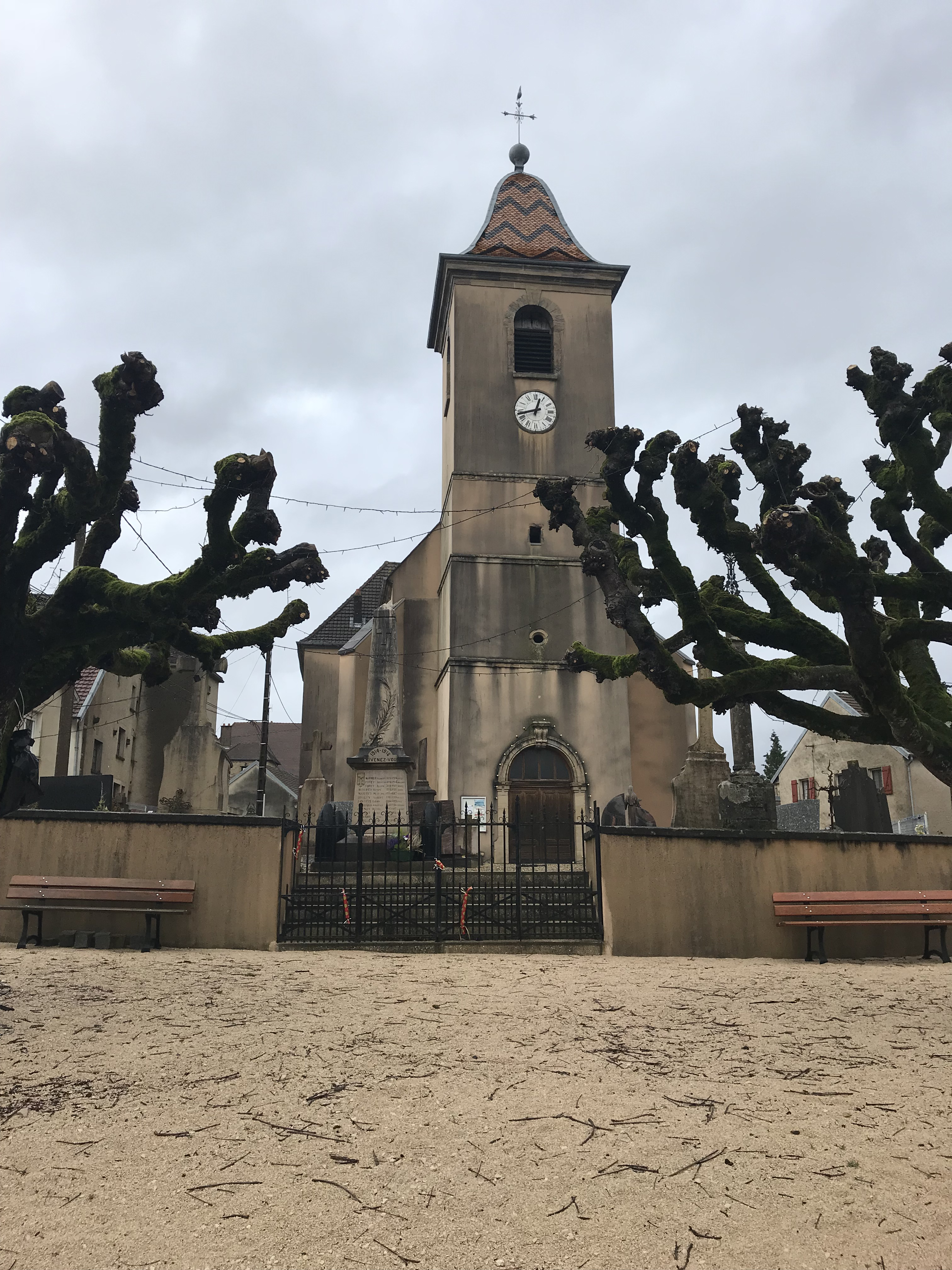
- The church in Vriange
- Location of Vriange
- Location within France Location within Bourgogne-Franche-Comté
- Coordinates: 47°10′51″N 5°34′56″E
- Country: France
- Region: Bourgogne-Franche-Comté
- Department: Jura
- Arrondissement: Dole
- Canton: Authume
- Intercommunality: CA Grand Dole

Government
  - Mayor (2020–2026): Jacques Lagnien
- Area^{1}: 5.78 km^{2} (2.23 sq mi)
- Highest elevation: 378 m (1,240 ft)
- Lowest elevation: 226 m (741 ft)
- Population (2023): 163
  - Density: 28.2/km^{2} (73.0/sq mi)
- Time zone: UTC+01:00 (CET)
  - Summer (DST): UTC+02:00 (CEST)
- INSEE/Postal code: 39584 /39700
- ^{1} French Land Register data, which excludes lakes, ponds, glaciers > 1 km^{2} (0.386 sq mi or 247 acres) and river estuaries.

Vriange (French pronunciation: [vʁijɑ̃ʒ]) is a commune in the Jura department in the Bourgogne-Franche-Comté region in eastern France.

== Population ==
Historical population
Year	Pop.	±% p.a.
1968	149	—
1975	123	−2.70%
1982	126	+0.34%
1990	142	+1.51%
1999	137	−0.40%
2007	136	−0.09%
2012	126	−1.52%
2017	156	+4.36%
2023	163	+0.73%
Source: INSEE

== See also ==
- Communes of the Jura department
