= Gredisans =

Commune in Bourgogne-Franche-Comté, France

- Commune
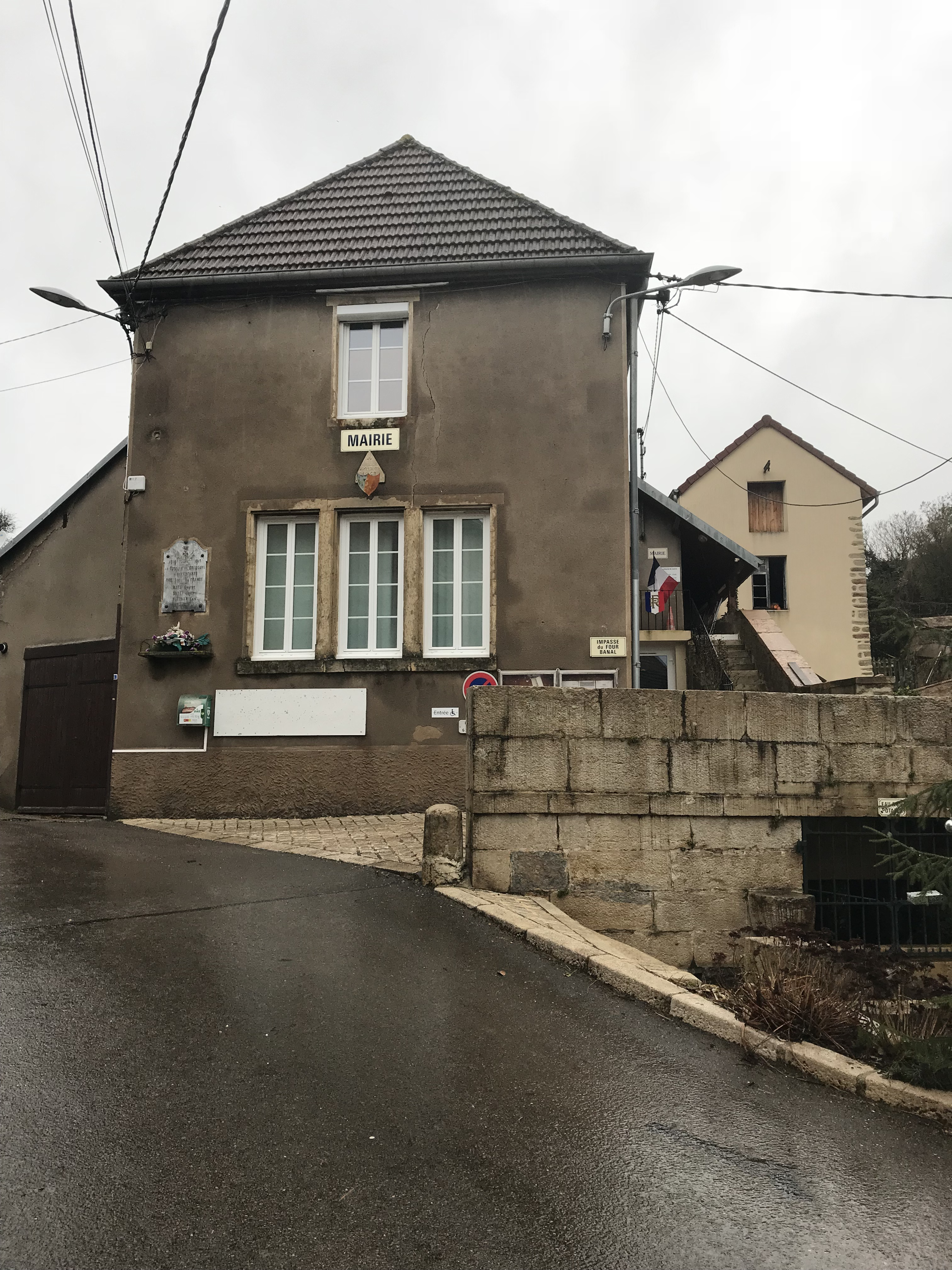
- The town hall in Gredisans
- Location of Gredisans
- Location within France Location within Bourgogne-Franche-Comté
- Coordinates: 47°09′29″N 5°30′50″E
- Country: France
- Region: Bourgogne-Franche-Comté
- Department: Jura
- Arrondissement: Dole
- Canton: Authume
- Intercommunality: CA Grand Dole

Government
  - Mayor (2020–2026): Georges Jeannerod
- Area^{1}: 2.37 km^{2} (0.92 sq mi)
- Highest elevation: 348 m (1,142 ft)
- Lowest elevation: 240 m (790 ft)
- Population (2023): 136
  - Density: 57.4/km^{2} (149/sq mi)
- Time zone: UTC+01:00 (CET)
  - Summer (DST): UTC+02:00 (CEST)
- INSEE/Postal code: 39262 /39290
- ^{1} French Land Register data, which excludes lakes, ponds, glaciers > 1 km^{2} (0.386 sq mi or 247 acres) and river estuaries.

Gredisans (French pronunciation: [ɡʁədizɑ̃]) is a commune in the Jura department in Bourgogne-Franche-Comté in eastern France.

== Population ==
Historical population
Year	Pop.	±% p.a.
1968	83	—
1975	106	+3.56%
1982	105	−0.14%
1990	134	+3.10%
1999	136	+0.16%
2007	144	+0.72%
2012	143	−0.14%
2017	136	−1.00%
2023	136	+0.00%
Source: INSEE

== See also ==
- Communes of the Jura department
