= Communauté d'agglomération du Grand Dole =

Grand Dole
- Communauté d'agglomération
- Interactive map of Grand Dole
- Coordinates: 47°06′N 05°30′E
- Country: France
- Region: Bourgogne-Franche-Comté
- Department: Jura
- No. of communes: {{{nbcomm}}}
- Established: 2008
- Area: 424.4 km^{2} (163.9 sq mi)
- Population (2019): 54,626
  - Density: 128.7/km^{2} (333.4/sq mi)
- Website: www.grand-dole.fr

Communauté d'agglomération du Grand Dole is the communauté d'agglomération, an intercommunal structure, centred on the town of Dole. It is located in the Jura department, in the Bourgogne-Franche-Comté region, eastern France. Created in 2008, its seat is in Dole. Its area is 424.4 km^{2}. Its population was 54,626 in 2019, of which 23,711 in Dole proper.

== Composition ==
The communauté d'agglomération consists of the following 47 communes:

1. Abergement-la-Ronce
2. Amange
3. Archelange
4. Audelange
5. Aumur
6. Authume
7. Auxange
8. Baverans
9. Biarne
10. Brevans
11. Champagney
12. Champdivers
13. Champvans
14. Châtenois
15. Chevigny
16. Choisey
17. Crissey
18. Damparis
19. Le Deschaux
20. Dole
21. Éclans-Nenon
22. Falletans
23. Foucherans
24. Frasne-les-Meulières
25. Gevry
26. Gredisans
27. Jouhe
28. Lavangeot
29. Lavans-lès-Dole
30. Malange
31. Menotey
32. Moissey
33. Monnières
34. Nevy-lès-Dole
35. Parcey
36. Peintre
37. Peseux
38. Pointre
39. Rainans
40. Rochefort-sur-Nenon
41. Romange
42. Saint-Aubin
43. Sampans
44. Tavaux
45. Villers-Robert
46. Villette-lès-Dole
47. Vriange
