= Biarne =

Commune in Bourgogne-Franche-Comté, France

- Commune
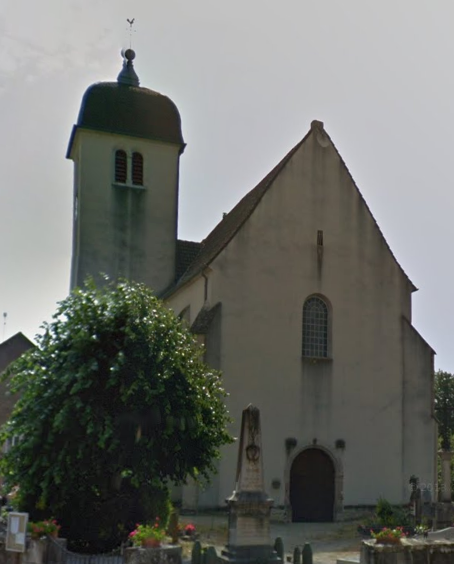
- The church in Biarne

- Coat of arms
- Location of Biarne
- Location within France Location within Bourgogne-Franche-Comté
- Coordinates: 47°08′48″N 5°27′27″E
- Country: France
- Region: Bourgogne-Franche-Comté
- Department: Jura
- Arrondissement: Dole
- Canton: Authume
- Intercommunality: CA Grand Dole

Government
  - Mayor (2020–2026): Olivier Lacroix
- Area^{1}: 6.21 km^{2} (2.40 sq mi)
- Highest elevation: 262 m (860 ft)
- Lowest elevation: 192 m (630 ft)
- Population (2023): 433
  - Density: 69.7/km^{2} (181/sq mi)
- Time zone: UTC+01:00 (CET)
  - Summer (DST): UTC+02:00 (CEST)
- INSEE/Postal code: 39051 /39290
- ^{1} French Land Register data, which excludes lakes, ponds, glaciers > 1 km^{2} (0.386 sq mi or 247 acres) and river estuaries.

Biarne (French pronunciation: [bjaʁn]) is a commune in the Jura department in the region of Bourgogne-Franche-Comté in eastern France.

== Population ==
Historical population
Year	Pop.	±% p.a.
1968	146	—
1975	152	+0.58%
1982	255	+7.67%
1990	355	+4.22%
1999	354	−0.03%
2007	364	+0.35%
2012	373	+0.49%
2017	407	+1.76%
2023	433	+1.04%
Source: INSEE

== See also ==
- Communes of the Jura department
