= Archelange =

Commune in Bourgogne-Franche-Comté, France

- Commune
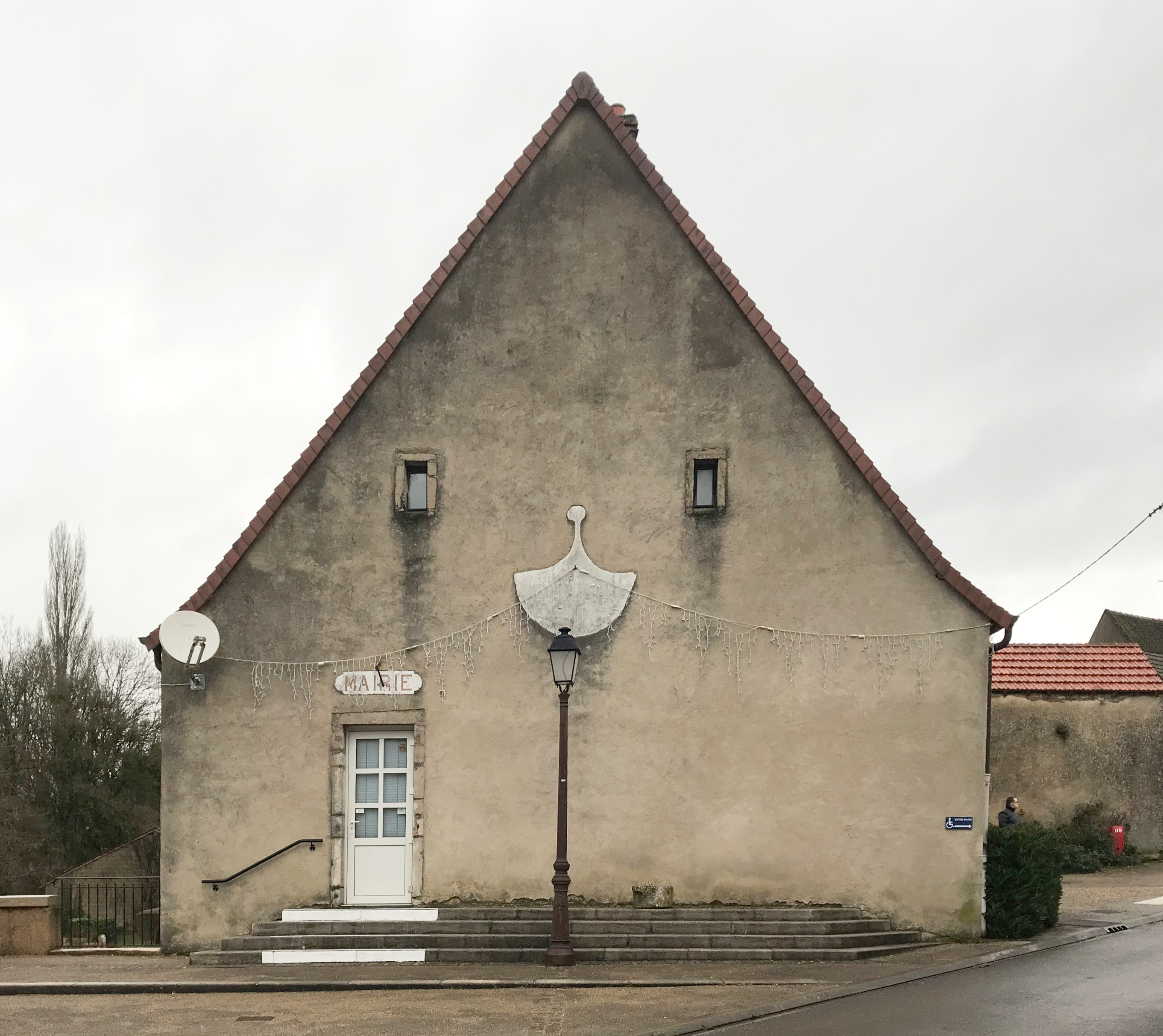
- The town hall in Archelange
- Location of Archelange
- Location within France Location within Bourgogne-Franche-Comté
- Coordinates: 47°08′54″N 5°30′53″E
- Country: France
- Region: Bourgogne-Franche-Comté
- Department: Jura
- Arrondissement: Dole
- Canton: Authume
- Intercommunality: CA Grand Dole

Government
  - Mayor (2020–2026): Thierry Gauthray-Guyénet
- Area^{1}: 5.09 km^{2} (1.97 sq mi)
- Highest elevation: 352 m (1,155 ft)
- Lowest elevation: 229 m (751 ft)
- Population (2023): 219
  - Density: 43.0/km^{2} (111/sq mi)
- Time zone: UTC+01:00 (CET)
  - Summer (DST): UTC+02:00 (CEST)
- INSEE/Postal code: 39014 /39290
- ^{1} French Land Register data, which excludes lakes, ponds, glaciers > 1 km^{2} (0.386 sq mi or 247 acres) and river estuaries.

Archelange (French pronunciation: [aʁʃəlɑ̃ʒ]) is a commune in the Jura department in the region of Bourgogne-Franche-Comté in eastern France.

== Population ==
Historical population
Year	Pop.	±% p.a.
1968	146	—
1975	113	−3.59%
1982	164	+5.47%
1990	197	+2.32%
1999	213	+0.87%
2007	227	+0.80%
2012	235	+0.70%
2017	218	−1.49%
2023	219	+0.08%
Source: INSEE

== See also ==
- Communes of the Jura department
