= Romain, Jura =

Commune in Bourgogne-Franche-Comté, France

Romain
- Commune
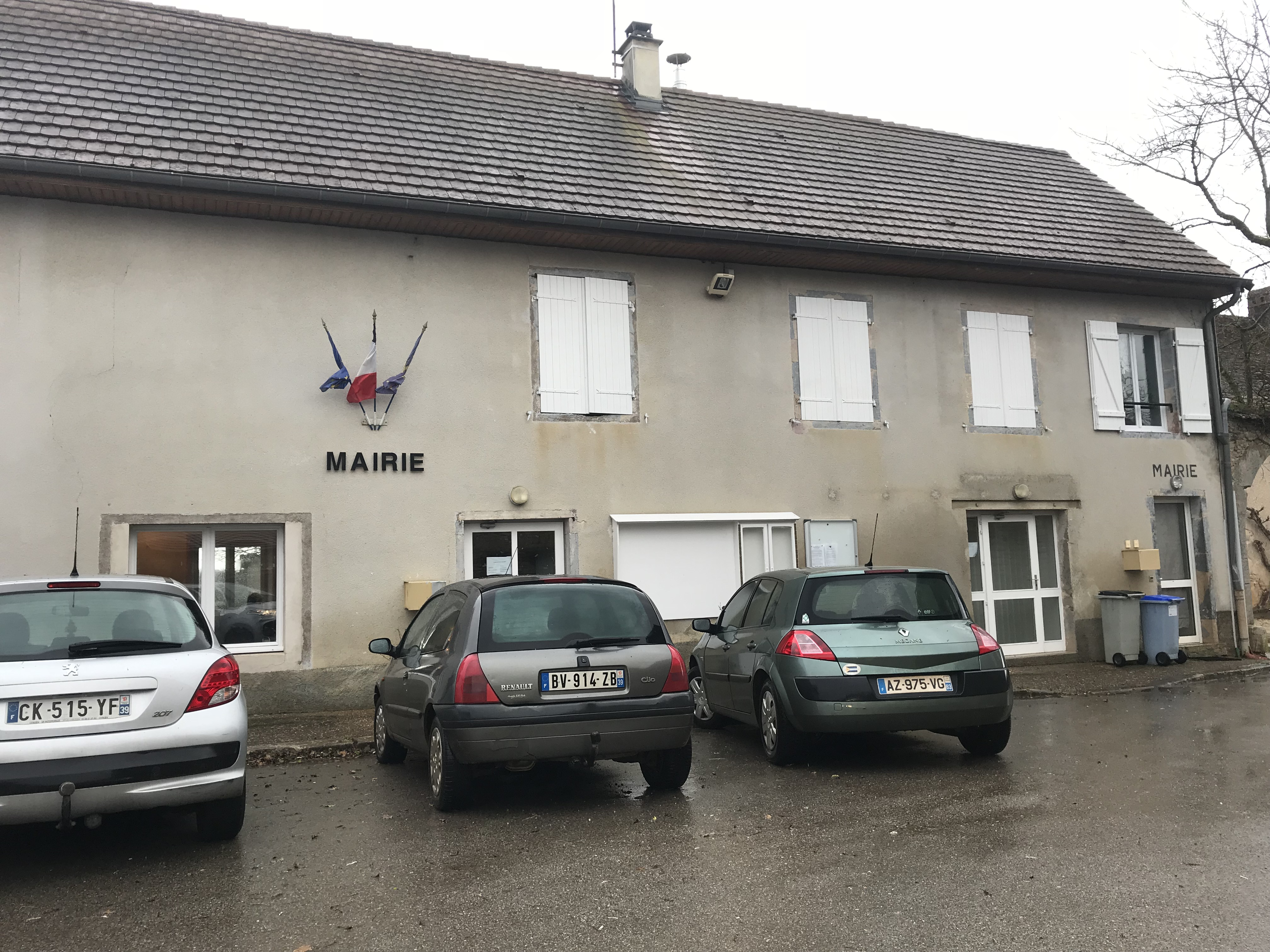
- The town hall in Romain
- Location of Romain
- Location within France Location within Bourgogne-Franche-Comté
- Coordinates: 47°12′51″N 5°43′17″E
- Country: France
- Region: Bourgogne-Franche-Comté
- Department: Jura
- Arrondissement: Dole
- Canton: Authume

Government
  - Mayor (2020–2026): Aurélie Chancenotte
- Area^{1}: 6.07 km^{2} (2.34 sq mi)
- Highest elevation: 298 m (978 ft)
- Lowest elevation: 240 m (790 ft)
- Population (2023): 249
  - Density: 41.0/km^{2} (106/sq mi)
- Time zone: UTC+01:00 (CET)
  - Summer (DST): UTC+02:00 (CEST)
- INSEE/Postal code: 39464 /39350
- ^{1} French Land Register data, which excludes lakes, ponds, glaciers > 1 km^{2} (0.386 sq mi or 247 acres) and river estuaries.

Romain (French pronunciation: [ʁɔmɛ̃]) is a commune in the Jura department in the region of Bourgogne-Franche-Comté in eastern France.

== Population ==
Historical population
Year	Pop.	±% p.a.
1968	110	—
1975	96	−1.93%
1982	101	+0.73%
1990	132	+3.40%
1999	140	+0.66%
2007	196	+4.30%
2012	208	+1.20%
2017	204	−0.39%
2023	249	+3.38%
Source: INSEE

== See also ==
- Communes of the Jura department
