= Menotey =

Commune in Bourgogne-Franche-Comté, France

- Commune
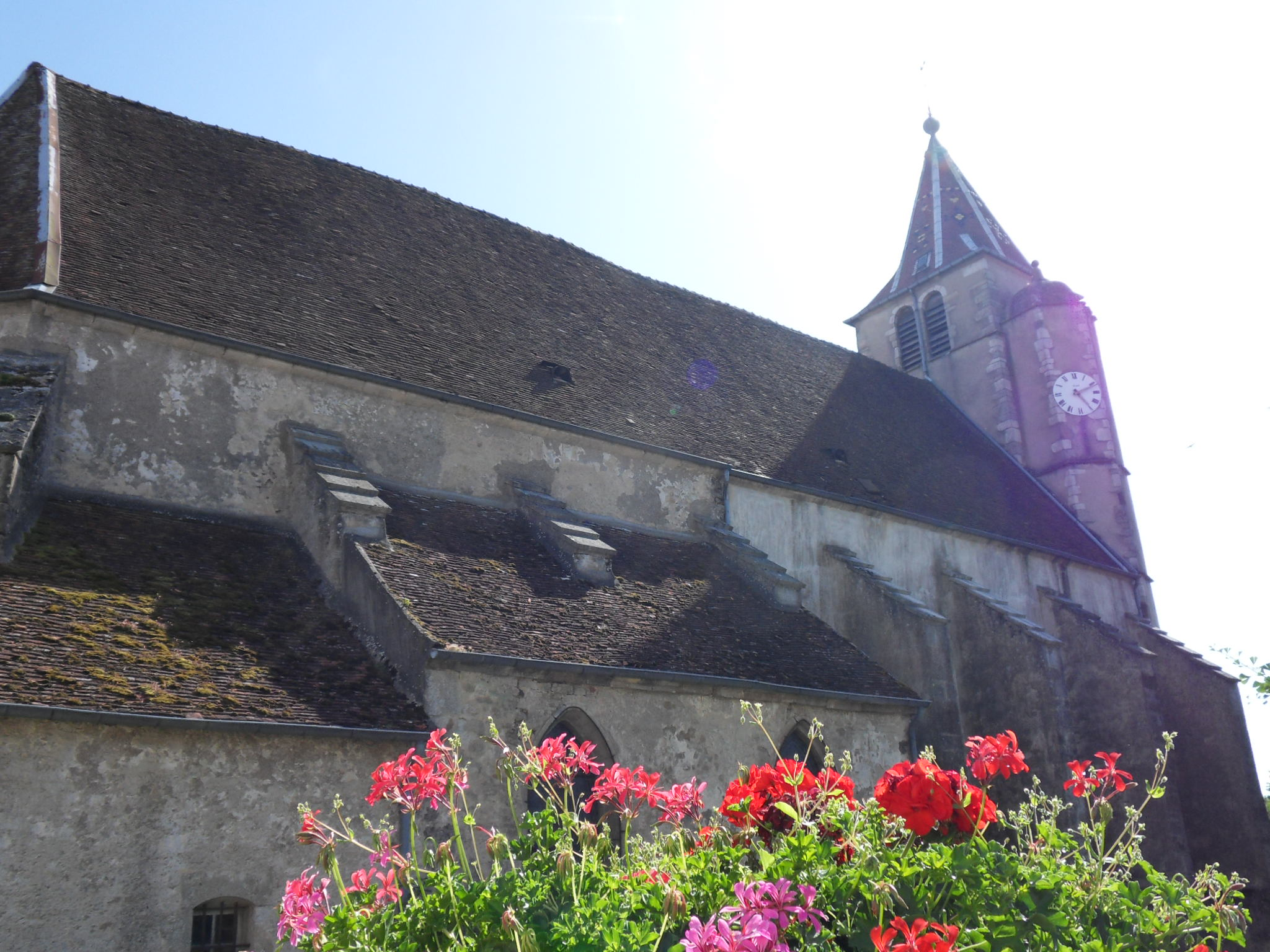
- The church in Menotey
- Location of Menotey
- Location within France Location within Bourgogne-Franche-Comté
- Coordinates: 47°09′48″N 5°29′55″E
- Country: France
- Region: Bourgogne-Franche-Comté
- Department: Jura
- Arrondissement: Dole
- Canton: Authume
- Intercommunality: CA Grand Dole

Government
  - Mayor (2020–2026): Cyril Millier
- Area^{1}: 5.02 km^{2} (1.94 sq mi)
- Highest elevation: 345 m (1,132 ft)
- Lowest elevation: 211 m (692 ft)
- Population (2023): 293
  - Density: 58.4/km^{2} (151/sq mi)
- Time zone: UTC+01:00 (CET)
  - Summer (DST): UTC+02:00 (CEST)
- INSEE/Postal code: 39323 /39290
- ^{1} French Land Register data, which excludes lakes, ponds, glaciers > 1 km^{2} (0.386 sq mi or 247 acres) and river estuaries.

Menotey (French pronunciation: [mənɔtɛ]) is a commune in the Jura department in Bourgogne-Franche-Comté in eastern France.

== Population ==
Historical population
Year	Pop.	±% p.a.
1968	210	—
1975	217	+0.47%
1982	189	−1.95%
1990	202	+0.83%
1999	235	+1.70%
2007	274	+1.94%
2012	280	+0.43%
2017	306	+1.79%
2023	293	−0.72%
Source: INSEE

== See also ==
- Communes of the Jura department
