= Romange =

Commune in Bourgogne-Franche-Comté, France

- Commune
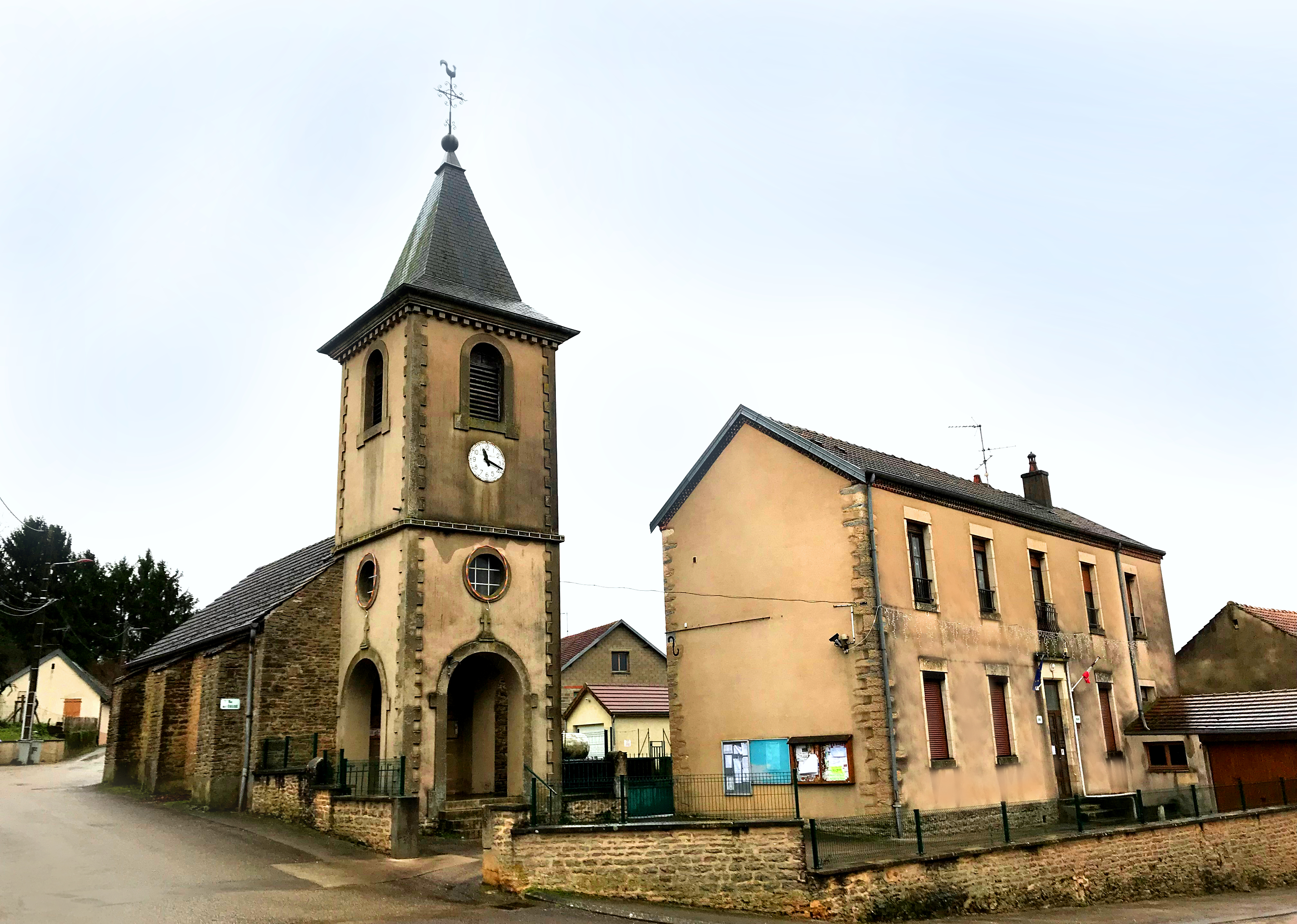
- The church and town hall in Romange
- Location of Romange
- Location within France Location within Bourgogne-Franche-Comté
- Coordinates: 47°09′35″N 5°36′06″E
- Country: France
- Region: Bourgogne-Franche-Comté
- Department: Jura
- Arrondissement: Dole
- Canton: Authume
- Intercommunality: CA Grand Dole

Government
  - Mayor (2020–2026): Julien Stolz
- Area^{1}: 5.49 km^{2} (2.12 sq mi)
- Highest elevation: 258 m (846 ft)
- Lowest elevation: 211 m (692 ft)
- Population (2023): 204
  - Density: 37.2/km^{2} (96.2/sq mi)
- Time zone: UTC+01:00 (CET)
  - Summer (DST): UTC+02:00 (CEST)
- INSEE/Postal code: 39465 /39700
- ^{1} French Land Register data, which excludes lakes, ponds, glaciers > 1 km^{2} (0.386 sq mi or 247 acres) and river estuaries.

Romange (French pronunciation: [ʁɔmɑ̃ʒ]) is a commune in the Jura department in the region of Bourgogne-Franche-Comté in eastern France.

== Population ==
Historical population
| Year | Pop. | ±% p.a. |
|---|---|---|
| 1968 | 115 | — |
| 1975 | 111 | −0.50% |
| 1982 | 139 | +3.27% |
| 1990 | 154 | +1.29% |
| 1999 | 182 | +1.87% |
| 2007 | 203 | +1.37% |
| 2012 | 206 | +0.29% |
| 2017 | 199 | −0.69% |
| 2023 | 204 | +0.41% |
Source: INSEE

== See also ==
- Communes of the Jura department
