= Rainans =

Commune in Bourgogne-Franche-Comté, France

- Commune
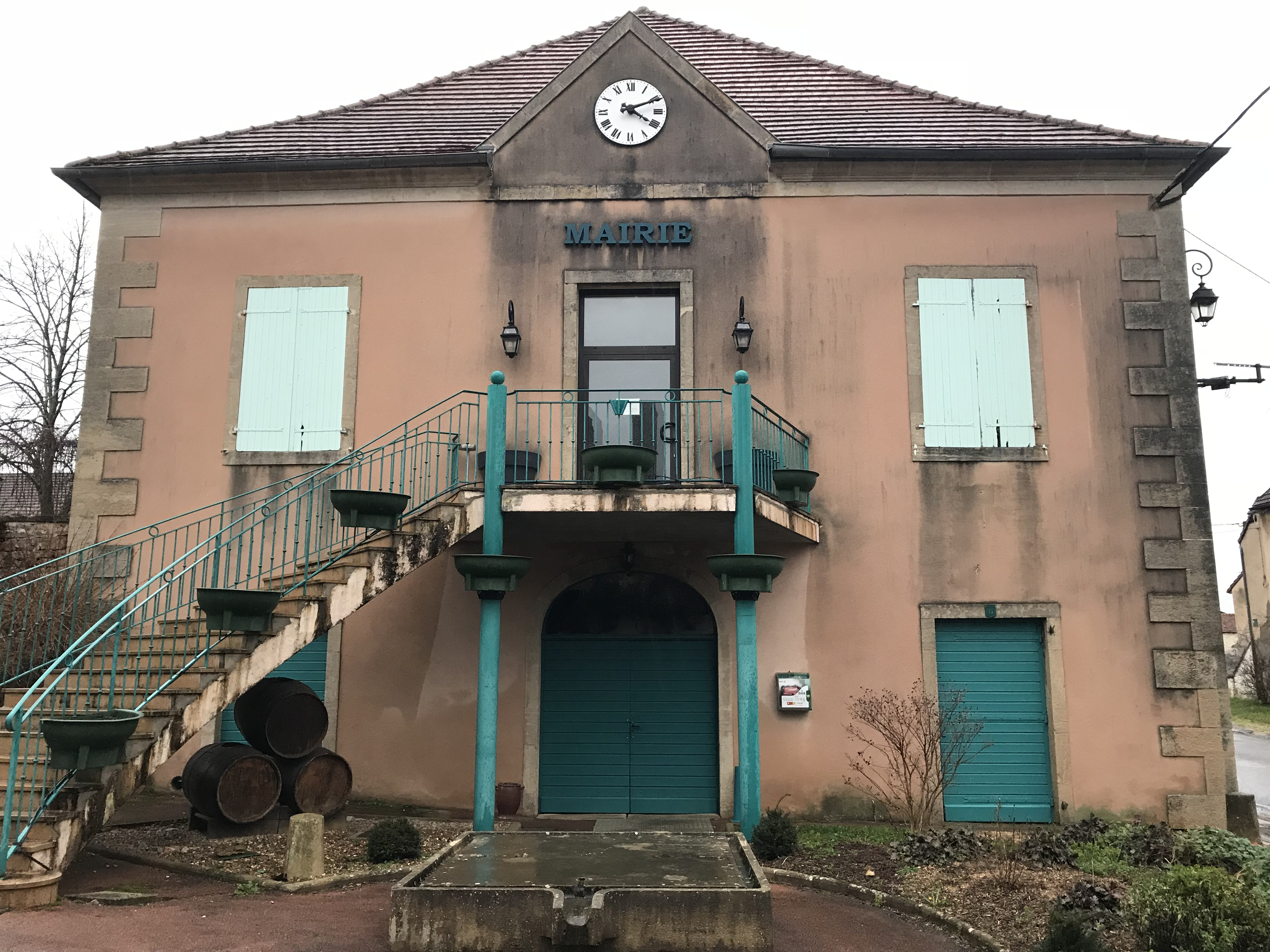
- The town hall in Rainans
- Location of Rainans
- Location within France Location within Bourgogne-Franche-Comté
- Coordinates: 47°09′23″N 5°28′54″E
- Country: France
- Region: Bourgogne-Franche-Comté
- Department: Jura
- Arrondissement: Dole
- Canton: Authume
- Intercommunality: CA Grand Dole

Government
  - Mayor (2020–2026): Pascal Sancey
- Area^{1}: 3.67 km^{2} (1.42 sq mi)
- Highest elevation: 310 m (1,020 ft)
- Lowest elevation: 199 m (653 ft)
- Population (2023): 263
  - Density: 71.7/km^{2} (186/sq mi)
- Time zone: UTC+01:00 (CET)
  - Summer (DST): UTC+02:00 (CEST)
- INSEE/Postal code: 39449 /39290
- ^{1} French Land Register data, which excludes lakes, ponds, glaciers > 1 km^{2} (0.386 sq mi or 247 acres) and river estuaries.

Rainans (French pronunciation: [ʁɛnɑ̃]) is a commune in the Jura department in Bourgogne-Franche-Comté in eastern France.

== Population ==
Historical population
Year	Pop.	±% p.a.
1968	115	—
1975	107	−1.02%
1982	156	+5.53%
1990	172	+1.23%
1999	173	+0.06%
2007	195	+1.51%
2012	232	+3.54%
2017	269	+3.00%
2023	263	−0.38%
Source: INSEE

== See also ==
- Communes of the Jura department
