= Ougney =

Commune in Bourgogne-Franche-Comté, France

- Commune
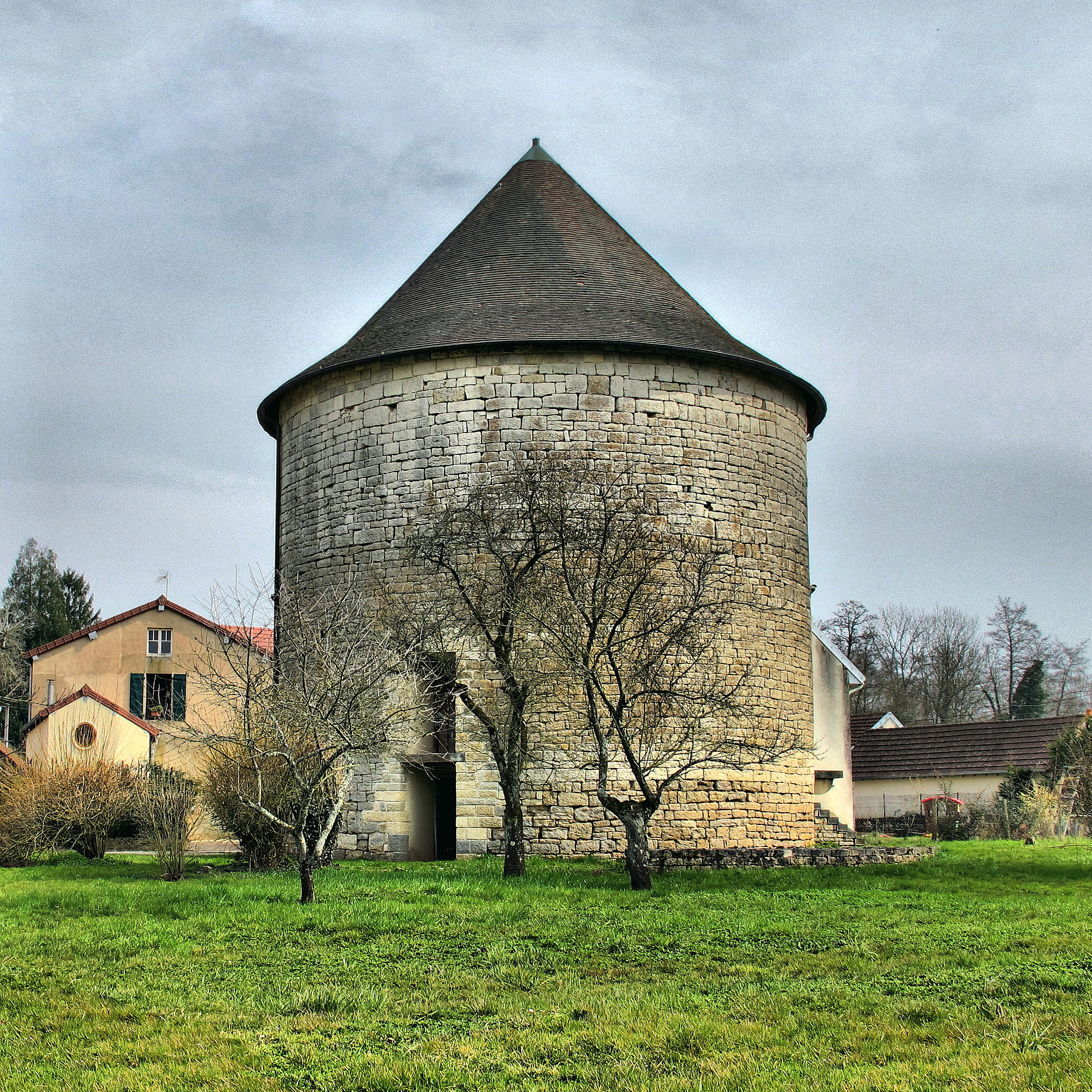
- Tower of the former château
- Location of Ougney
- Location within France Location within Bourgogne-Franche-Comté
- Coordinates: 47°14′29″N 5°40′08″E
- Country: France
- Region: Bourgogne-Franche-Comté
- Department: Jura
- Arrondissement: Dole
- Canton: Authume

Government
  - Mayor (2020–2026): Cédric Ivanes
- Area^{1}: 7.08 km^{2} (2.73 sq mi)
- Highest elevation: 372 m (1,220 ft)
- Lowest elevation: 193 m (633 ft)
- Population (2023): 431
  - Density: 60.9/km^{2} (158/sq mi)
- Time zone: UTC+01:00 (CET)
  - Summer (DST): UTC+02:00 (CEST)
- INSEE/Postal code: 39398 /39350
- ^{1} French Land Register data, which excludes lakes, ponds, glaciers > 1 km^{2} (0.386 sq mi or 247 acres) and river estuaries.

Ougney (French pronunciation: [uɲɛ]) is a commune in the Jura department in Bourgogne-Franche-Comté in eastern France.

== Population ==
Historical population
Year	Pop.	±% p.a.
1968	182	—
1975	180	−0.16%
1982	230	+3.56%
1990	267	+1.88%
1999	283	+0.65%
2007	298	+0.65%
2012	318	+1.31%
2017	375	+3.35%
2023	431	+2.35%
Source: INSEE

== See also ==
- Communes of the Jura department
