= Brans =

Commune in Bourgogne-Franche-Comté, France

- Commune
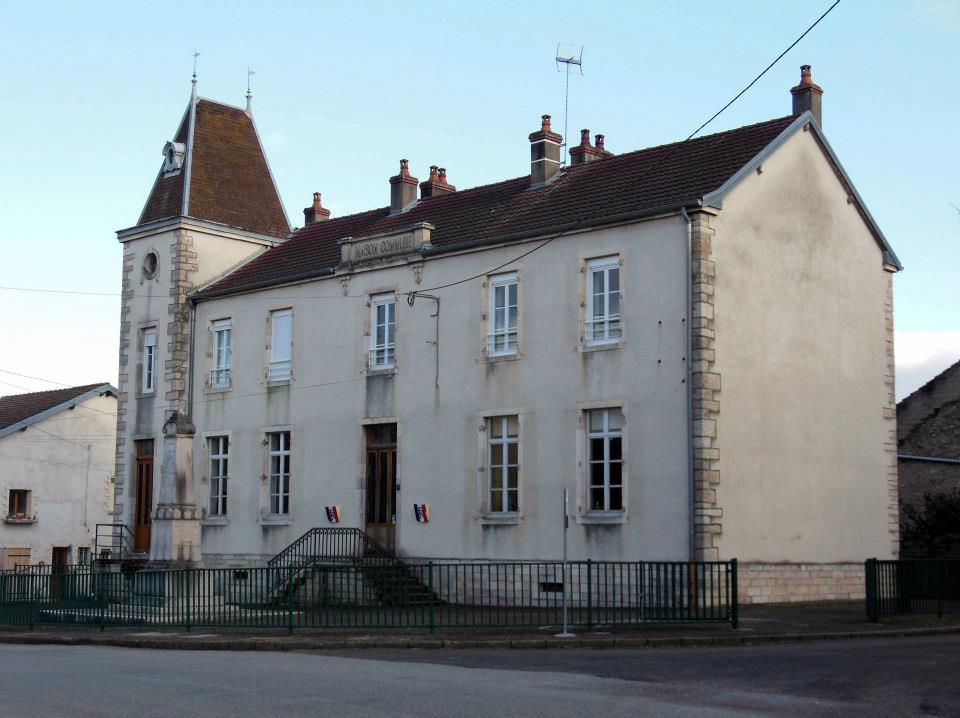
- The town hall in Brans
- Location of Brans
- Location within France Location within Bourgogne-Franche-Comté
- Coordinates: 47°13′59″N 5°34′04″E
- Country: France
- Region: Bourgogne-Franche-Comté
- Department: Jura
- Arrondissement: Dole
- Canton: Authume

Government
  - Mayor (2020–2026): Michaël Peres
- Area^{1}: 8.77 km^{2} (3.39 sq mi)
- Highest elevation: 367 m (1,204 ft)
- Lowest elevation: 198 m (650 ft)
- Population (2023): 200
  - Density: 23/km^{2} (59/sq mi)
- Time zone: UTC+01:00 (CET)
  - Summer (DST): UTC+02:00 (CEST)
- INSEE/Postal code: 39074 /39290
- ^{1} French Land Register data, which excludes lakes, ponds, glaciers > 1 km^{2} (0.386 sq mi or 247 acres) and river estuaries.

Brans (French pronunciation: [bʁɑ̃]) is a commune in the Jura department in Bourgogne-Franche-Comté in eastern France.

== Population ==
Historical population
Year	Pop.	±% p.a.
1968	182	—
1975	166	−1.31%
1982	168	+0.17%
1990	170	+0.15%
1999	178	+0.51%
2007	214	+2.33%
2012	237	+2.06%
2017	216	−1.84%
2023	200	−1.27%
Source: INSEE

== See also ==
- Communes of the Jura department
