= Canton of Authume =

Coordinates: 47.12°N 5.50°E

The canton of Authume is an administrative division of the Jura department, eastern France. It was created at the French canton reorganisation which came into effect in March 2015. Its seat is in Authume.

It consists of the following communes:

1. Amange
2. Archelange
3. Audelange
4. Authume
5. Auxange
6. Baverans
7. Biarne
8. Brans
9. Brevans
10. Champagney
11. Châtenois
12. Chevigny
13. Dammartin-Marpain
14. Éclans-Nenon
15. Falletans
16. Frasne-les-Meulières
17. Gendrey
18. Gredisans
19. Jouhe
20. Lavangeot
21. Lavans-lès-Dole
22. Louvatange
23. Malange
24. Menotey
25. Moissey
26. Montmirey-la-Ville
27. Montmirey-le-Château
28. Mutigney
29. Offlanges
30. Ougney
31. Pagney
32. Peintre
33. Pointre
34. Rainans
35. Rochefort-sur-Nenon
36. Romain
37. Romange
38. Rouffange
39. Saligney
40. Sermange
41. Serre-les-Moulières
42. Taxenne
43. Thervay
44. Vitreux
45. Vriange
