= Pointre =

Commune in Bourgogne-Franche-Comté, France

- Commune
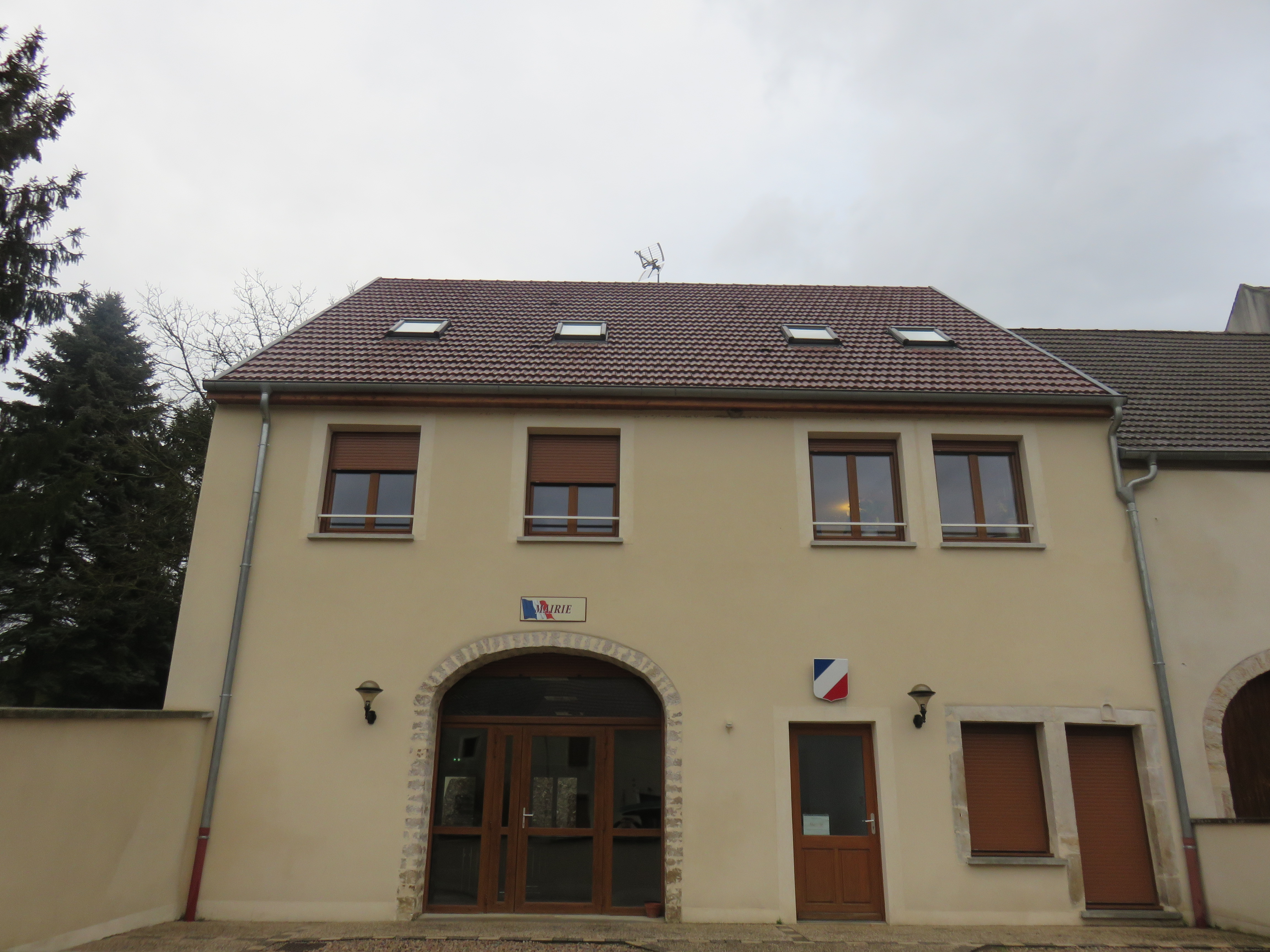
- The town hall in Pointre
- Location of Pointre
- Location within France Location within Bourgogne-Franche-Comté
- Coordinates: 47°13′32″N 5°30′03″E
- Country: France
- Region: Bourgogne-Franche-Comté
- Department: Jura
- Arrondissement: Dole
- Canton: Authume
- Intercommunality: CA Grand Dole

Government
  - Mayor (2020–2026): Emmanuel Saget
- Area^{1}: 6.54 km^{2} (2.53 sq mi)
- Highest elevation: 218 m (715 ft)
- Lowest elevation: 194 m (636 ft)
- Population (2023): 127
  - Density: 19.4/km^{2} (50.3/sq mi)
- Time zone: UTC+01:00 (CET)
  - Summer (DST): UTC+02:00 (CEST)
- INSEE/Postal code: 39432 /39290
- ^{1} French Land Register data, which excludes lakes, ponds, glaciers > 1 km^{2} (0.386 sq mi or 247 acres) and river estuaries.

Pointre (French pronunciation: [pwɛ̃tʁ]) is a commune in the Jura department in Bourgogne-Franche-Comté in eastern France.

== Population ==
Historical population
Year	Pop.	±% p.a.
1968	69	—
1975	62	−1.52%
1982	68	+1.33%
1990	69	+0.18%
1999	81	+1.80%
2007	97	+2.28%
2012	118	+4.00%
2017	126	+1.32%
2023	127	+0.13%
Source: INSEE

== See also ==
- Communes of the Jura department
