= Audelange =

Commune in Bourgogne-Franche-Comté, France

- Commune
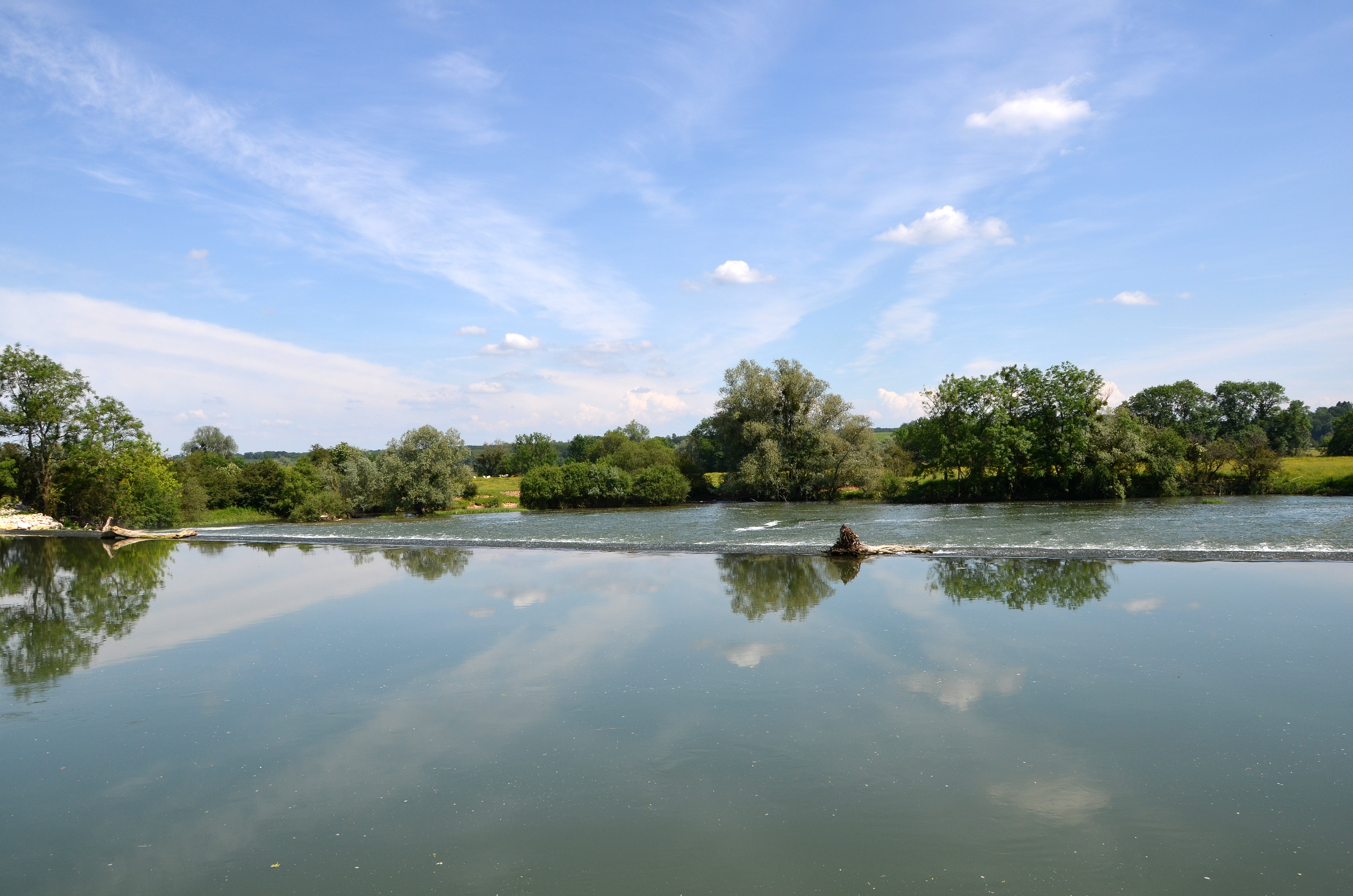
- The Doubs near Audelange
- Location of Audelange
- Location within France Location within Bourgogne-Franche-Comté
- Coordinates: 47°08′09″N 5°35′10″E
- Country: France
- Region: Bourgogne-Franche-Comté
- Department: Jura
- Arrondissement: Dole
- Canton: Authume
- Intercommunality: CA Grand Dole

Government
  - Mayor (2020–2026): Bernard Guerrin
- Area^{1}: 4.64 km^{2} (1.79 sq mi)
- Highest elevation: 257 m (843 ft)
- Lowest elevation: 203 m (666 ft)
- Population (2023): 256
  - Density: 55.2/km^{2} (143/sq mi)
- Time zone: UTC+01:00 (CET)
  - Summer (DST): UTC+02:00 (CEST)
- INSEE/Postal code: 39024 /39700
- ^{1} French Land Register data, which excludes lakes, ponds, glaciers > 1 km^{2} (0.386 sq mi or 247 acres) and river estuaries.

Audelange (French pronunciation: [odlɑ̃ʒ]) is a commune in the Jura department in the region of Bourgogne-Franche-Comté in eastern France.

== Population ==
Historical population
Year	Pop.	±% p.a.
1968	187	—
1975	180	−0.54%
1982	165	−1.24%
1990	170	+0.37%
1999	206	+2.16%
2007	225	+1.11%
2012	273	+3.94%
2017	270	−0.22%
2023	256	−0.88%
Source: INSEE

== See also ==
- Communes of the Jura department
