= Frasne-les-Meulières =

Commune in Bourgogne-Franche-Comté, France

- Commune
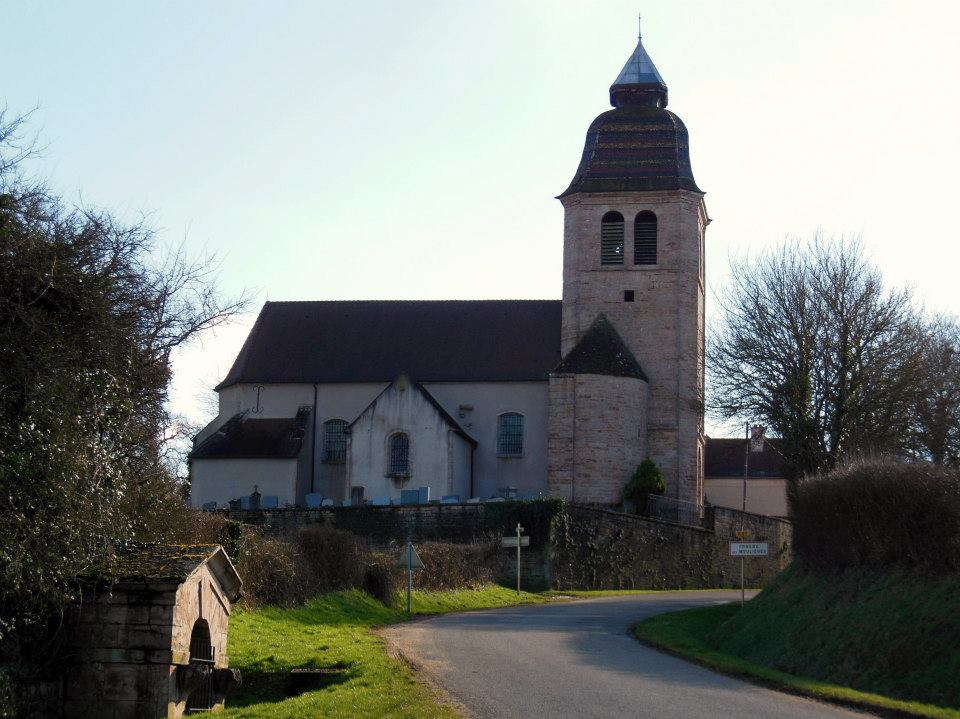
- The church in Frasne-les-Meulières
- Location of Frasne-les-Meulières
- Location within France Location within Bourgogne-Franche-Comté
- Coordinates: 47°12′18″N 5°30′09″E
- Country: France
- Region: Bourgogne-Franche-Comté
- Department: Jura
- Arrondissement: Dole
- Canton: Authume
- Intercommunality: CA Grand Dole

Government
  - Mayor (2020–2026): Jean-Paul Chapin
- Area^{1}: 4.88 km^{2} (1.88 sq mi)
- Highest elevation: 340 m (1,120 ft)
- Lowest elevation: 197 m (646 ft)
- Population (2023): 110
  - Density: 23/km^{2} (58/sq mi)
- Time zone: UTC+01:00 (CET)
  - Summer (DST): UTC+02:00 (CEST)
- INSEE/Postal code: 39238 /39290
- ^{1} French Land Register data, which excludes lakes, ponds, glaciers > 1 km^{2} (0.386 sq mi or 247 acres) and river estuaries.

Frasne-les-Meulières (French pronunciation: [fʁan le møljɛʁ], before 1999: Frasne) is a commune in the Jura department in Bourgogne-Franche-Comté in eastern France.

== Population ==
Historical population
Year	Pop.	±% p.a.
1968	91	—
1975	92	+0.16%
1982	110	+2.59%
1990	96	−1.69%
1999	119	+2.42%
2007	118	−0.11%
2012	113	−0.86%
2017	119	+1.04%
2023	110	−1.30%
Source: INSEE

== See also ==
- Communes of the Jura department
