= Amange =

Commune in Bourgogne-Franche-Comté, France

- Commune
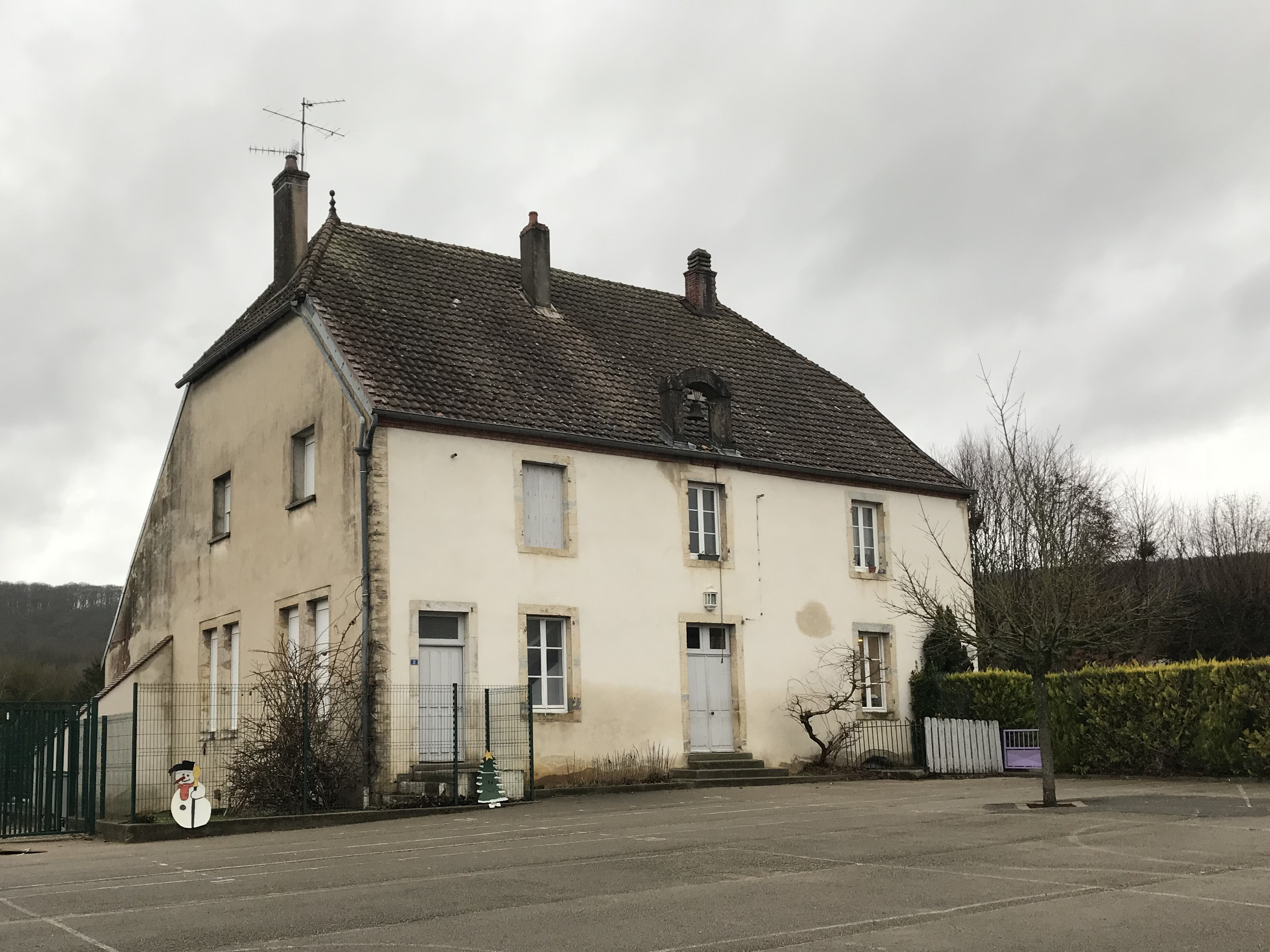
- The town hall in Amange
- Location of Amange
- Location within France Location within Bourgogne-Franche-Comté
- Coordinates: 47°09′59″N 5°33′56″E
- Country: France
- Region: Bourgogne-Franche-Comté
- Department: Jura
- Arrondissement: Dole
- Canton: Authume
- Intercommunality: CA Grand Dole

Government
  - Mayor (2020–2026): Daniel Bernardin
- Area^{1}: 6.77 km^{2} (2.61 sq mi)
- Highest elevation: 376 m (1,234 ft)
- Lowest elevation: 210 m (690 ft)
- Population (2023): 428
  - Density: 63.2/km^{2} (164/sq mi)
- Time zone: UTC+01:00 (CET)
  - Summer (DST): UTC+02:00 (CEST)
- INSEE/Postal code: 39008 /39700
- ^{1} French Land Register data, which excludes lakes, ponds, glaciers > 1 km^{2} (0.386 sq mi or 247 acres) and river estuaries.

Amange (French pronunciation: [amɑ̃ʒ]) is a commune in the Jura department in the region of Bourgogne-Franche-Comté in eastern France.

== Population ==
Historical population
Year	Pop.	±% p.a.
1968	191	—
1975	193	+0.15%
1982	298	+6.40%
1990	290	−0.34%
1999	288	−0.08%
2007	343	+2.21%
2012	400	+3.12%
2017	433	+1.60%
2023	428	−0.19%
Source: INSEE

== See also ==
- Communes of the Jura department
