= Peintre =

Commune in Bourgogne-Franche-Comté, France

- Commune
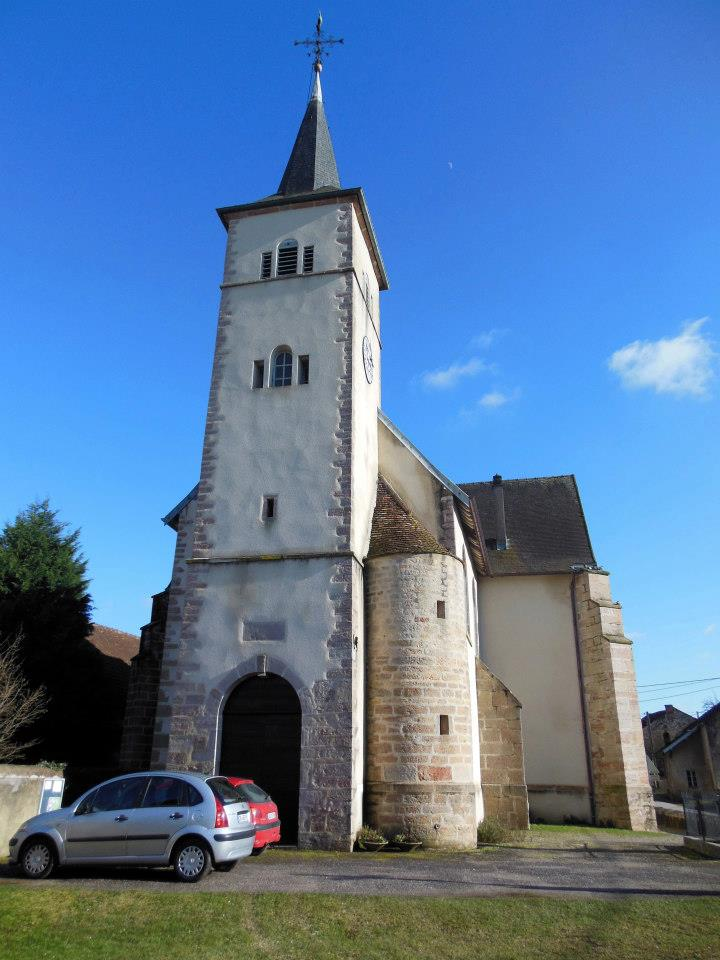
- The church in Peintre
- Location of Peintre
- Location within France Location within Bourgogne-Franche-Comté
- Coordinates: 47°11′41″N 5°28′57″E
- Country: France
- Region: Bourgogne-Franche-Comté
- Department: Jura
- Arrondissement: Dole
- Canton: Authume
- Intercommunality: CA Grand Dole

Government
  - Mayor (2020–2026): Olivier Gruet
- Area^{1}: 6.34 km^{2} (2.45 sq mi)
- Highest elevation: 262 m (860 ft)
- Lowest elevation: 190 m (620 ft)
- Population (2023): 135
  - Density: 21.3/km^{2} (55.1/sq mi)
- Time zone: UTC+01:00 (CET)
  - Summer (DST): UTC+02:00 (CEST)
- INSEE/Postal code: 39409 /39290
- ^{1} French Land Register data, which excludes lakes, ponds, glaciers > 1 km^{2} (0.386 sq mi or 247 acres) and river estuaries.

Peintre (French pronunciation: [pɛ̃tʁ]) is a commune in the Jura department in Bourgogne-Franche-Comté in eastern France.

== Population ==
Historical population
| Year | Pop. | ±% p.a. |
|---|---|---|
| 1968 | 131 | — |
| 1975 | 120 | −1.25% |
| 1982 | 114 | −0.73% |
| 1990 | 131 | +1.75% |
| 1999 | 135 | +0.33% |
| 2007 | 137 | +0.18% |
| 2012 | 123 | −2.13% |
| 2017 | 127 | +0.64% |
| 2023 | 135 | +1.02% |
Source: INSEE

== See also ==
- Communes of the Jura department
