= Baverans =

Commune in Bourgogne-Franche-Comté, France

- Commune
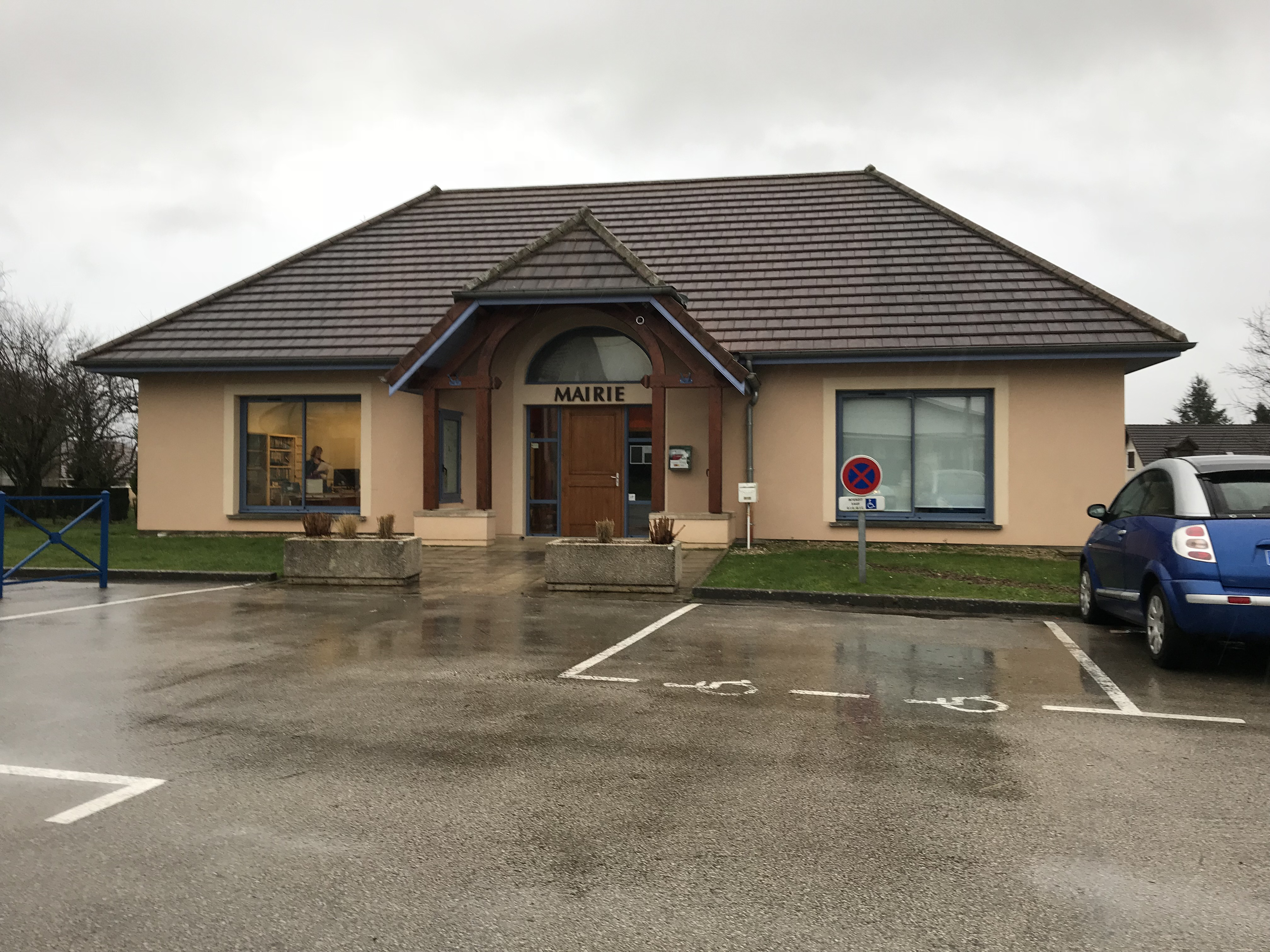
- The town hall in Baverans

- Coat of arms
- Location of Baverans
- Location within France Location within Bourgogne-Franche-Comté
- Coordinates: 47°06′10″N 5°32′24″E
- Country: France
- Region: Bourgogne-Franche-Comté
- Department: Jura
- Arrondissement: Dole
- Canton: Authume
- Intercommunality: CA Grand Dole

Government
  - Mayor (2020–2026): Agnès Mathiot
- Area^{1}: 3.41 km^{2} (1.32 sq mi)
- Highest elevation: 237 m (778 ft)
- Lowest elevation: 201 m (659 ft)
- Population (2023): 498
  - Density: 146/km^{2} (378/sq mi)
- Time zone: UTC+01:00 (CET)
  - Summer (DST): UTC+02:00 (CEST)
- INSEE/Postal code: 39042 /39100
- ^{1} French Land Register data, which excludes lakes, ponds, glaciers > 1 km^{2} (0.386 sq mi or 247 acres) and river estuaries.

Baverans (French pronunciation: [bavʁɑ̃]) is a commune in the Jura department in the region of Bourgogne-Franche-Comté in eastern France.

== Population ==
Historical population
Year	Pop.	±% p.a.
1968	220	—
1975	267	+2.80%
1982	294	+1.39%
1990	319	+1.03%
1999	323	+0.14%
2007	391	+2.42%
2012	476	+4.01%
2017	500	+0.99%
2023	498	−0.07%
Source: INSEE

== Heraldry ==
Coat of arms of Baverans	Per fess: 1st half per fess azure semé of billets or a crowned lion of the same, armed and langued gules, 2nd party per pale I gules a facade of the church of the place argent masoned sable, II argent a fess, a bend and a bend, the three wavy azure; overall the division argent charged with the inscription “BAVERANS” in capital letters sable. Adopted (drawing submitted by the town hall), date not specified.

== See also ==
- Communes of the Jura department
