= Sermange =

- Commune
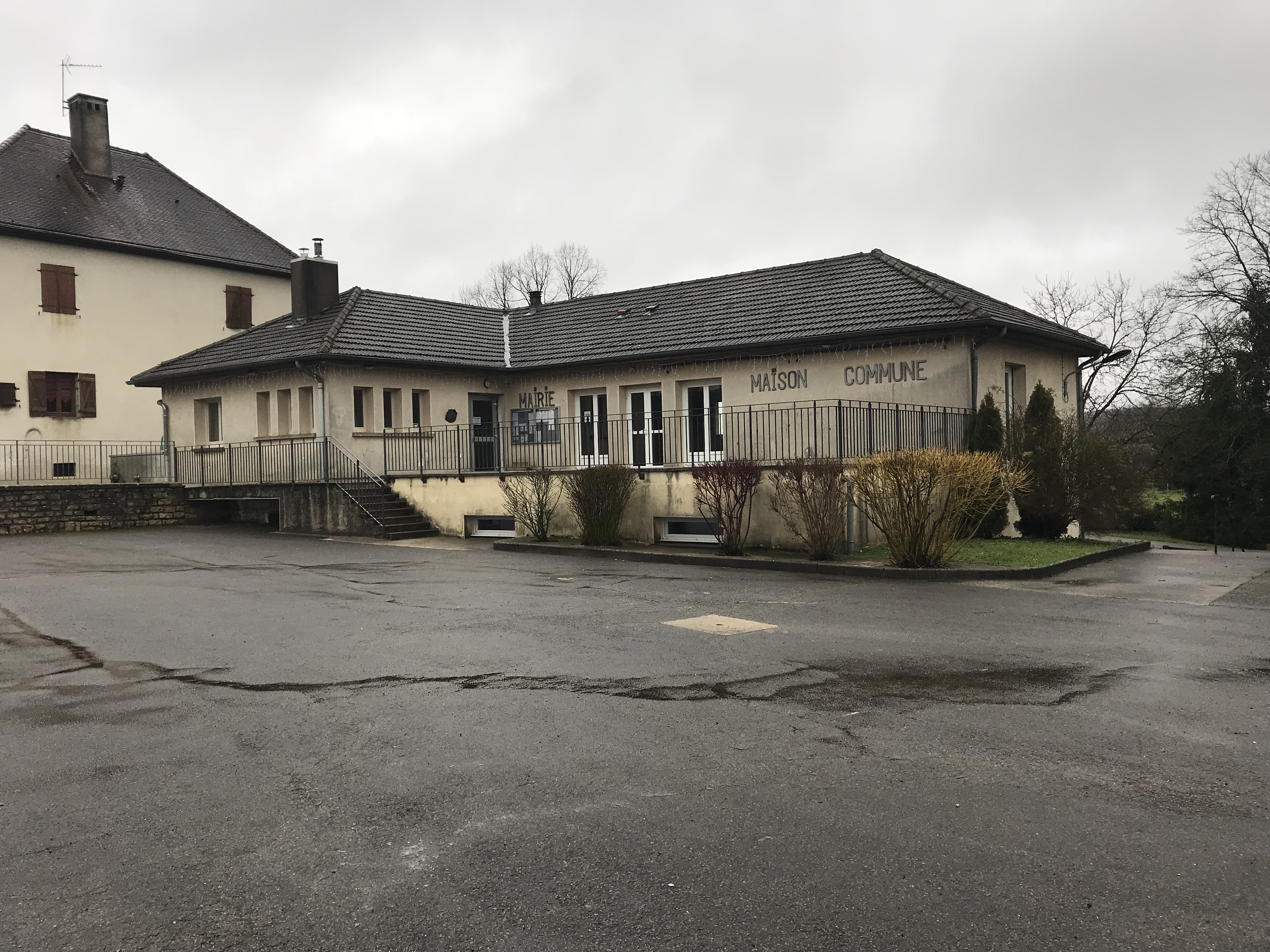
- The town hall in Sermange
- Location of Sermange
- Location within France Location within Bourgogne-Franche-Comté
- Coordinates: 47°11′38″N 5°39′03″E
- Country: France
- Region: Bourgogne-Franche-Comté
- Department: Jura
- Arrondissement: Dole
- Canton: Authume

Government
  - Mayor (2020–2026): Michel Benessiano
- Area^{1}: 7.07 km^{2} (2.73 sq mi)
- Highest elevation: 284 m (932 ft)
- Lowest elevation: 228 m (748 ft)
- Population (2023): 247
  - Density: 34.9/km^{2} (90.5/sq mi)
- Time zone: UTC+01:00 (CET)
  - Summer (DST): UTC+02:00 (CEST)
- INSEE/Postal code: 39513 /39700
- ^{1} French Land Register data, which excludes lakes, ponds, glaciers > 1 km^{2} (0.386 sq mi or 247 acres) and river estuaries.

Sermange (French pronunciation: [sɛʁmɑ̃ʒ]) is a commune in the Jura department in the Bourgogne-Franche-Comté region in eastern France.

== Population ==
Historical population
| Year | Pop. | ±% p.a. |
|---|---|---|
| 1968 | 153 | — |
| 1975 | 144 | −0.86% |
| 1982 | 186 | +3.72% |
| 1990 | 210 | +1.53% |
| 1999 | 231 | +1.06% |
| 2007 | 264 | +1.68% |
| 2012 | 271 | +0.52% |
| 2017 | 249 | −1.68% |
| 2023 | 247 | −0.13% |
Source: INSEE

== See also ==
- Communes of the Jura department
