= Montmirey-le-Château =

Commune in Bourgogne-Franche-Comté, France

- Commune
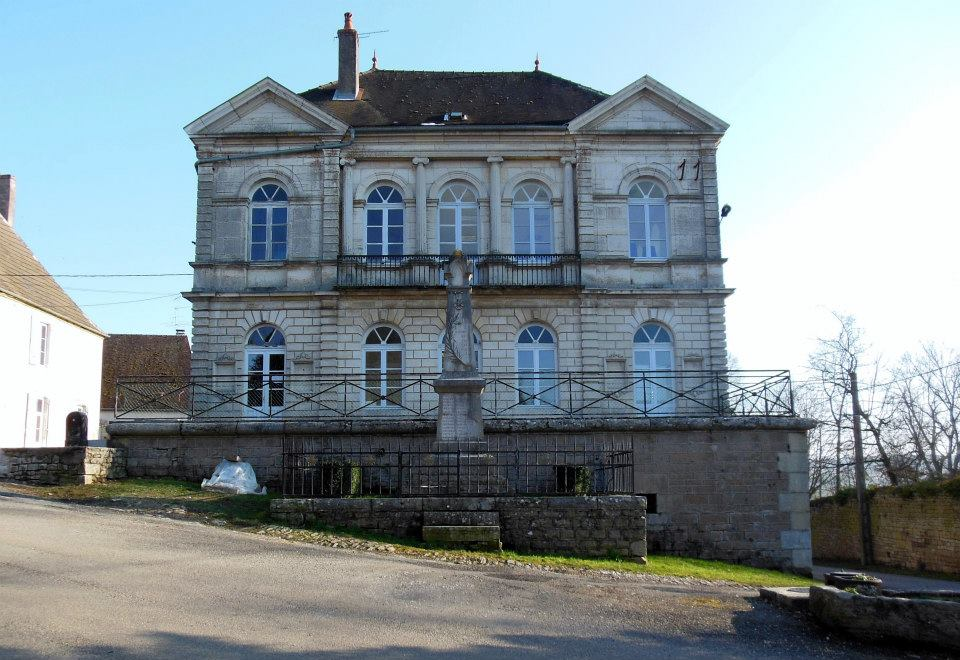
- Town hall
- Location of Montmirey-le-Château
- Location within France Location within Bourgogne-Franche-Comté
- Coordinates: 47°13′28″N 5°32′07″E
- Country: France
- Region: Bourgogne-Franche-Comté
- Department: Jura
- Arrondissement: Dole
- Canton: Authume

Government
  - Mayor (2020–2026): Martin Daune
- Area^{1}: 8.02 km^{2} (3.10 sq mi)
- Highest elevation: 293 m (961 ft)
- Lowest elevation: 204 m (669 ft)
- Population (2023): 198
  - Density: 24.7/km^{2} (63.9/sq mi)
- Time zone: UTC+01:00 (CET)
  - Summer (DST): UTC+02:00 (CEST)
- INSEE/Postal code: 39361 /39290
- ^{1} French Land Register data, which excludes lakes, ponds, glaciers > 1 km^{2} (0.386 sq mi or 247 acres) and river estuaries.

Montmirey-le-Château (French pronunciation: [mɔ̃miʁɛ l(ə) ʃɑto]) is a commune in the Jura department in Bourgogne-Franche-Comté in eastern France.

== Population ==
Historical population
Year	Pop.	±% p.a.
1968	121	—
1975	137	+1.79%
1982	127	−1.08%
1990	123	−0.40%
1999	145	+1.85%
2007	203	+4.30%
2012	161	−4.53%
2017	197	+4.12%
2023	198	+0.08%
Source: INSEE

== See also ==
- Communes of the Jura department
