= Louvatange =

Commune in Bourgogne-Franche-Comté, France

- Commune
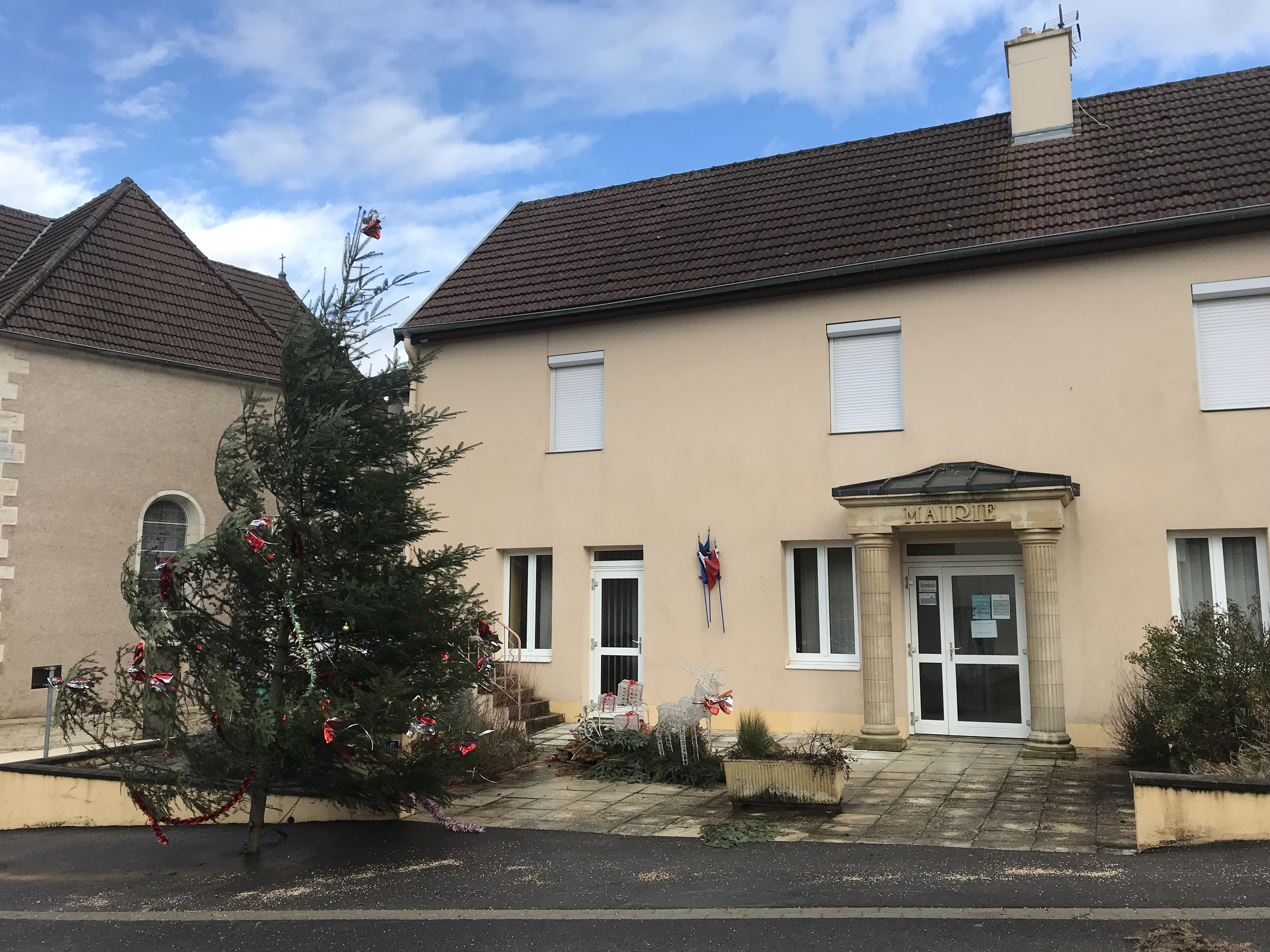
- The town hall in Louvatange
- Location of Louvatange
- Location within France Location within Bourgogne-Franche-Comté
- Coordinates: 47°11′50″N 5°43′05″E
- Country: France
- Region: Bourgogne-Franche-Comté
- Department: Jura
- Arrondissement: Dole
- Canton: Authume

Government
  - Mayor (2024–2026): Martial Matz
- Area^{1}: 3.31 km^{2} (1.28 sq mi)
- Highest elevation: 265 m (869 ft)
- Lowest elevation: 234 m (768 ft)
- Population (2023): 120
  - Density: 36/km^{2} (94/sq mi)
- Time zone: UTC+01:00 (CET)
  - Summer (DST): UTC+02:00 (CEST)
- INSEE/Postal code: 39302 /39350
- ^{1} French Land Register data, which excludes lakes, ponds, glaciers > 1 km^{2} (0.386 sq mi or 247 acres) and river estuaries.

Louvatange (French pronunciation: [luvatɑ̃ʒ]) is a commune in the Jura department in Bourgogne-Franche-Comté in eastern France.

== Population ==
Historical population
Year	Pop.	±% p.a.
1968	77	—
1975	63	−2.83%
1982	76	+2.72%
1990	70	−1.02%
1999	71	+0.16%
2007	107	+5.26%
2012	106	−0.19%
2017	97	−1.76%
2023	120	+3.61%
Source: INSEE

== See also ==
- Communes of the Jura department
