= Lavangeot =

Commune in Bourgogne-Franche-Comté, France

- Commune
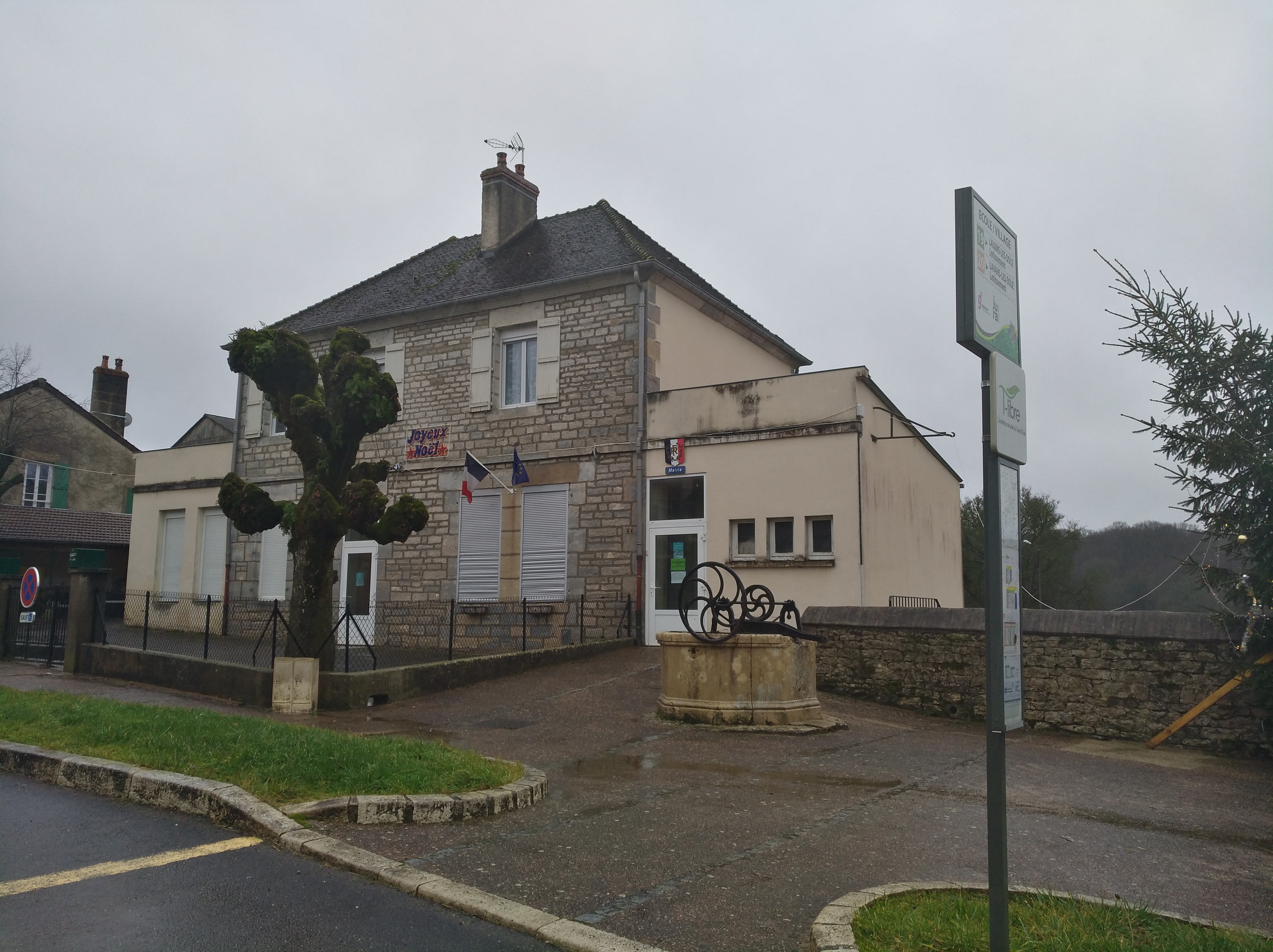
- The town hall in Lavangeot
- Location of Lavangeot
- Location within France Location within Bourgogne-Franche-Comté
- Coordinates: 47°09′11″N 5°36′35″E
- Country: France
- Region: Bourgogne-Franche-Comté
- Department: Jura
- Arrondissement: Dole
- Canton: Authume
- Intercommunality: CA Grand Dole

Government
  - Mayor (2020–2026): Joël Pannaux
- Area^{1}: 2.41 km^{2} (0.93 sq mi)
- Highest elevation: 247 m (810 ft)
- Lowest elevation: 207 m (679 ft)
- Population (2023): 135
  - Density: 56.0/km^{2} (145/sq mi)
- Time zone: UTC+01:00 (CET)
  - Summer (DST): UTC+02:00 (CEST)
- INSEE/Postal code: 39284 /39700
- ^{1} French Land Register data, which excludes lakes, ponds, glaciers > 1 km^{2} (0.386 sq mi or 247 acres) and river estuaries.

Lavangeot (French pronunciation: [lavɑ̃ʒo]) is a commune in the Jura department in Bourgogne-Franche-Comté in eastern France.

== Population ==
Historical population
Year	Pop.	±% p.a.
1968	101	—
1975	121	+2.61%
1982	128	+0.81%
1990	196	+5.47%
1999	157	−2.44%
2007	120	−3.30%
2012	118	−0.34%
2017	138	+3.18%
2023	135	−0.37%
Source: INSEE

== See also ==
- Communes of the Jura department
