= Saligney =

Commune in Bourgogne-Franche-Comté, France

- Commune
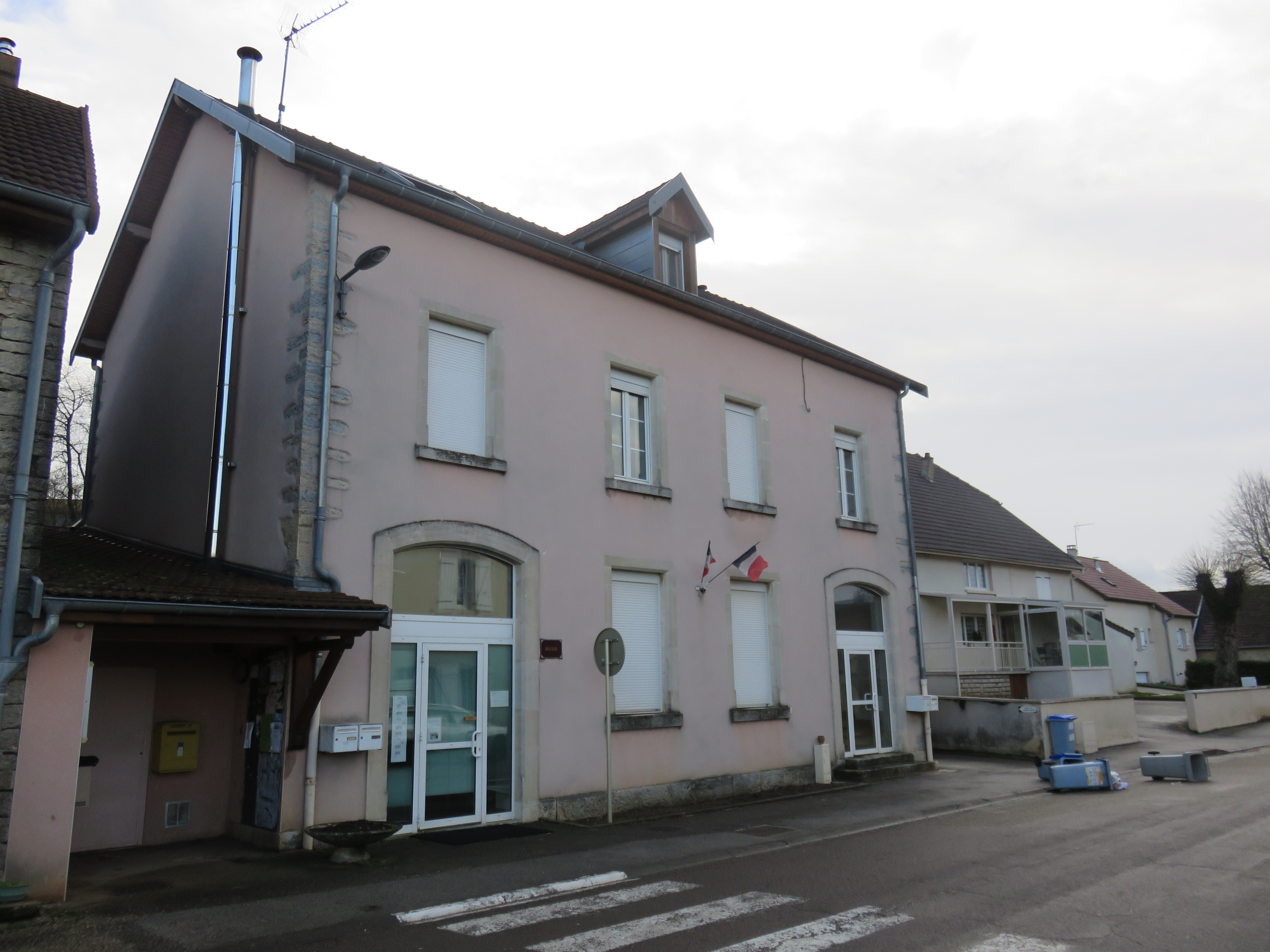
- The town hall in Saligney
- Location of Saligney
- Location within France Location within Bourgogne-Franche-Comté
- Coordinates: 47°13′15″N 5°38′27″E
- Country: France
- Region: Bourgogne-Franche-Comté
- Department: Jura
- Arrondissement: Dole
- Canton: Authume

Government
  - Mayor (2020–2026): Gilbert Lavry
- Area^{1}: 7.98 km^{2} (3.08 sq mi)
- Highest elevation: 354 m (1,161 ft)
- Lowest elevation: 199 m (653 ft)
- Population (2023): 186
  - Density: 23.3/km^{2} (60.4/sq mi)
- Time zone: UTC+01:00 (CET)
  - Summer (DST): UTC+02:00 (CEST)
- INSEE/Postal code: 39499 /39350
- ^{1} French Land Register data, which excludes lakes, ponds, glaciers > 1 km^{2} (0.386 sq mi or 247 acres) and river estuaries.

Saligney (French pronunciation: [saliɲɛ]) is a commune that is located in the Jura department of the Bourgogne-Franche-Comté region in eastern France.

== Population ==
Historical population
Year	Pop.	±% p.a.
1968	108	—
1975	90	−2.57%
1982	138	+6.30%
1990	162	+2.02%
1999	153	−0.63%
2007	164	+0.87%
2012	178	+1.65%
2017	185	+0.77%
2023	186	+0.09%
Source: INSEE

== See also ==
- Communes of the Jura department
