= Rouffange =

Commune in Bourgogne-Franche-Comté, France

- Commune
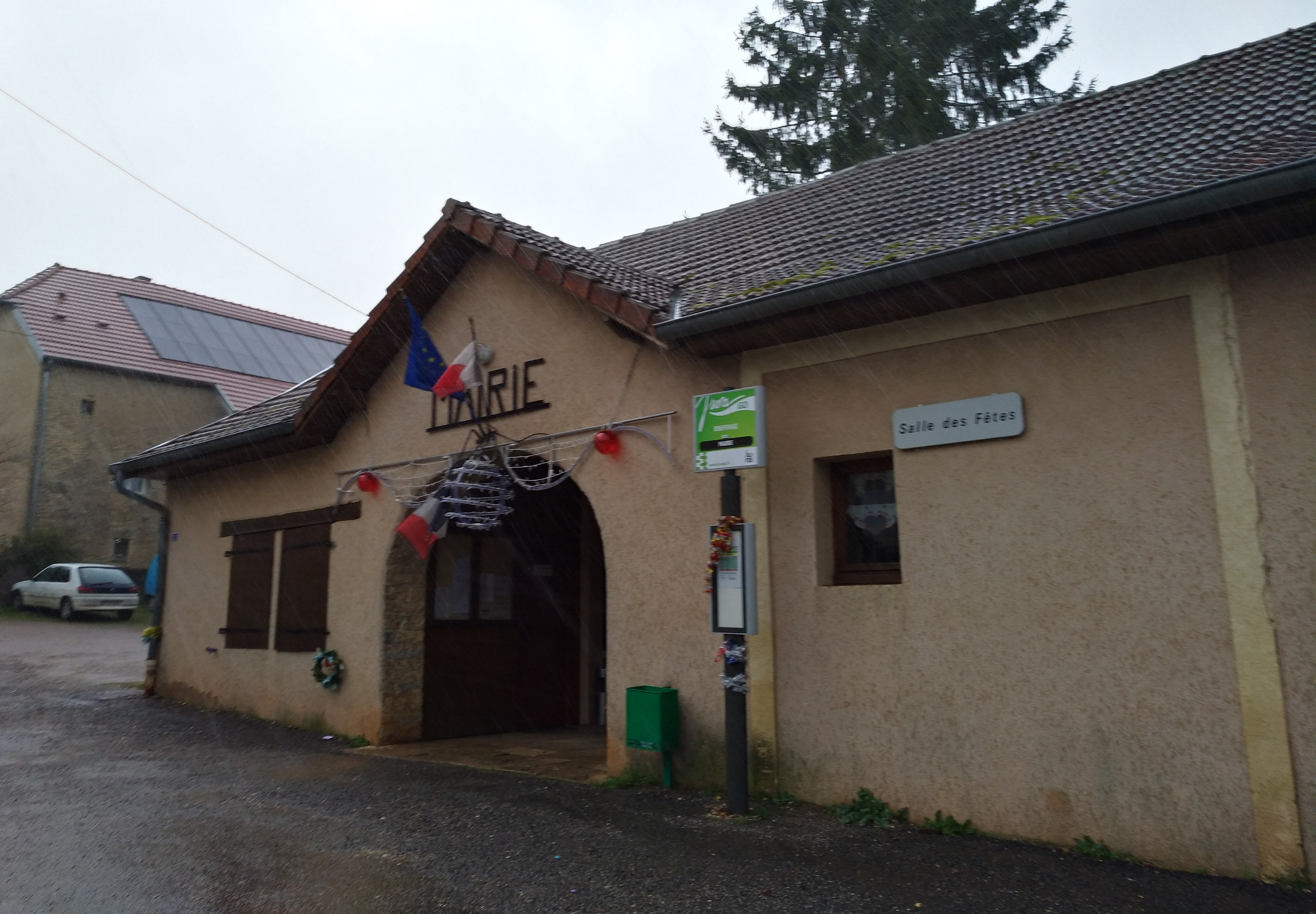
- The town hall in Rouffange
- Location of Rouffange
- Location within France Location within Bourgogne-Franche-Comté
- Coordinates: 47°13′31″N 5°42′26″E
- Country: France
- Region: Bourgogne-Franche-Comté
- Department: Jura
- Arrondissement: Dole
- Canton: Authume

Government
  - Mayor (2024–2026): Marie Helene Vachet
- Area^{1}: 2.87 km^{2} (1.11 sq mi)
- Highest elevation: 351 m (1,152 ft)
- Lowest elevation: 228 m (748 ft)
- Population (2023): 120
  - Density: 42/km^{2} (110/sq mi)
- Time zone: UTC+01:00 (CET)
  - Summer (DST): UTC+02:00 (CEST)
- INSEE/Postal code: 39469 /39350
- ^{1} French Land Register data, which excludes lakes, ponds, glaciers > 1 km^{2} (0.386 sq mi or 247 acres) and river estuaries.

Rouffange (French pronunciation: [ʁufɑ̃ʒ]) is a commune in the Jura department in the region of Bourgogne-Franche-Comté in eastern France.

== Population ==
Historical population
Year	Pop.	±% p.a.
1968	89	—
1975	74	−2.60%
1982	69	−0.99%
1990	80	+1.87%
1999	83	+0.41%
2007	93	+1.43%
2012	95	+0.43%
2017	104	+1.83%
2023	120	+2.41%
Source: INSEE

== See also ==
- Communes of the Jura department
