= Falletans =

Administrative division in Bourgogne-Franche-Comté, France

- Commune
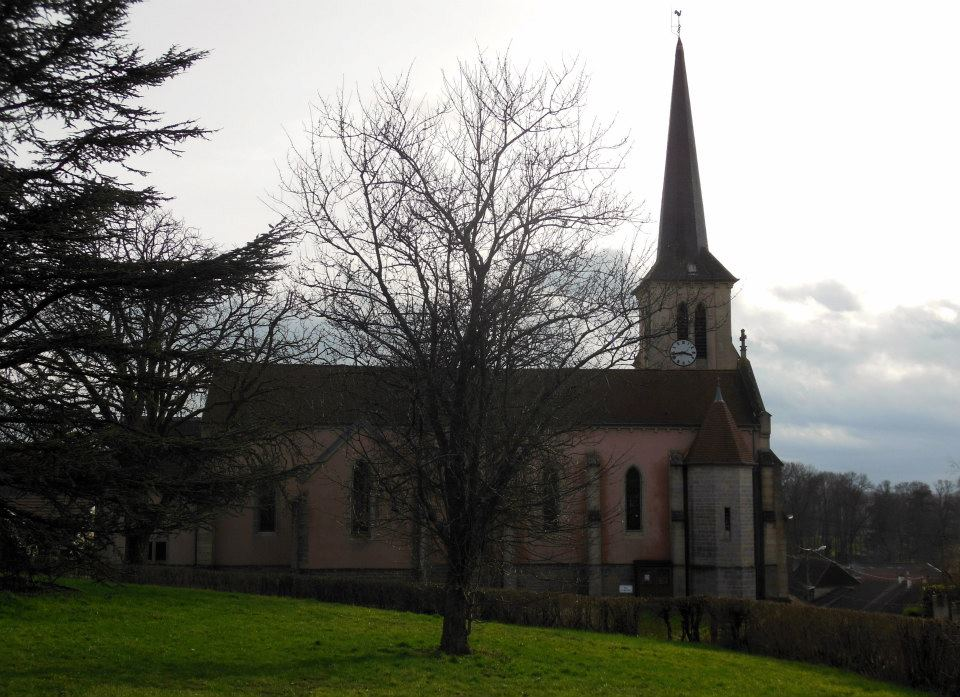
- The church in Falletans

- Coat of arms
- Location of Falletans
- Location within France Location within Bourgogne-Franche-Comté
- Coordinates: 47°06′12″N 5°33′47″E
- Country: France
- Region: Bourgogne-Franche-Comté
- Department: Jura
- Arrondissement: Dole
- Canton: Authume
- Intercommunality: CA Grand Dole

Government
  - Mayor (2020–2026): Pascal Lopez
- Area^{1}: 24.35 km^{2} (9.40 sq mi)
- Highest elevation: 264 m (866 ft)
- Lowest elevation: 200 m (660 ft)
- Population (2023): 392
  - Density: 16.1/km^{2} (41.7/sq mi)
- Time zone: UTC+01:00 (CET)
  - Summer (DST): UTC+02:00 (CEST)
- INSEE/Postal code: 39220 /39700
- ^{1} French Land Register data, which excludes lakes, ponds, glaciers > 1 km^{2} (0.386 sq mi or 247 acres) and river estuaries.

Falletans (French pronunciation: [faltɑ̃]) is a commune in the Jura department in Bourgogne-Franche-Comté in eastern France.

== Population ==
Historical population
Year	Pop.	±% p.a.
1968	262	—
1975	274	+0.64%
1982	282	+0.41%
1990	279	−0.13%
1999	309	+1.14%
2007	383	+2.72%
2012	395	+0.62%
2017	393	−0.10%
2023	392	−0.04%
Source: INSEE

== See also ==
- Communes of the Jura department
