= Offlanges =

Commune in Bourgogne-Franche-Comté, France

- Commune
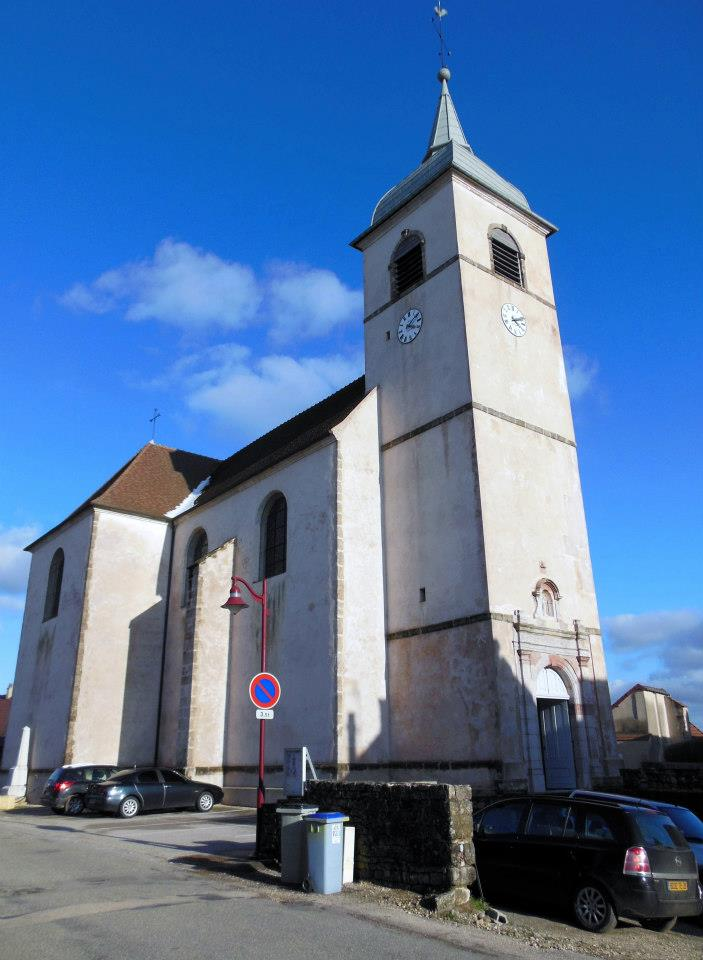
- The church in Offlanges

- Coat of arms
- Location of Offlanges
- Location within France Location within Bourgogne-Franche-Comté
- Coordinates: 47°12′33″N 5°33′04″E
- Country: France
- Region: Bourgogne-Franche-Comté
- Department: Jura
- Arrondissement: Dole
- Canton: Authume

Government
  - Mayor (2020–2026): Jean-Claude Thabard
- Area^{1}: 8.73 km^{2} (3.37 sq mi)
- Highest elevation: 378 m (1,240 ft)
- Lowest elevation: 204 m (669 ft)
- Population (2023): 199
  - Density: 22.8/km^{2} (59.0/sq mi)
- Time zone: UTC+01:00 (CET)
  - Summer (DST): UTC+02:00 (CEST)
- INSEE/Postal code: 39392 /39290
- ^{1} French Land Register data, which excludes lakes, ponds, glaciers > 1 km^{2} (0.386 sq mi or 247 acres) and river estuaries.

Offlanges (French pronunciation: [ɔflɑ̃ʒ]) is a commune in the Jura department in Bourgogne-Franche-Comté in eastern France.

== Population ==
Historical population
Year	Pop.	±% p.a.
1968	175	—
1975	153	−1.90%
1982	126	−2.74%
1990	161	+3.11%
1999	189	+1.80%
2007	194	+0.33%
2012	196	+0.21%
2017	198	+0.20%
2023	199	+0.08%
Source: INSEE

== See also ==
- Communes of the Jura department
