= Pagney =

Commune in Bourgogne-Franche-Comté, France

- Commune
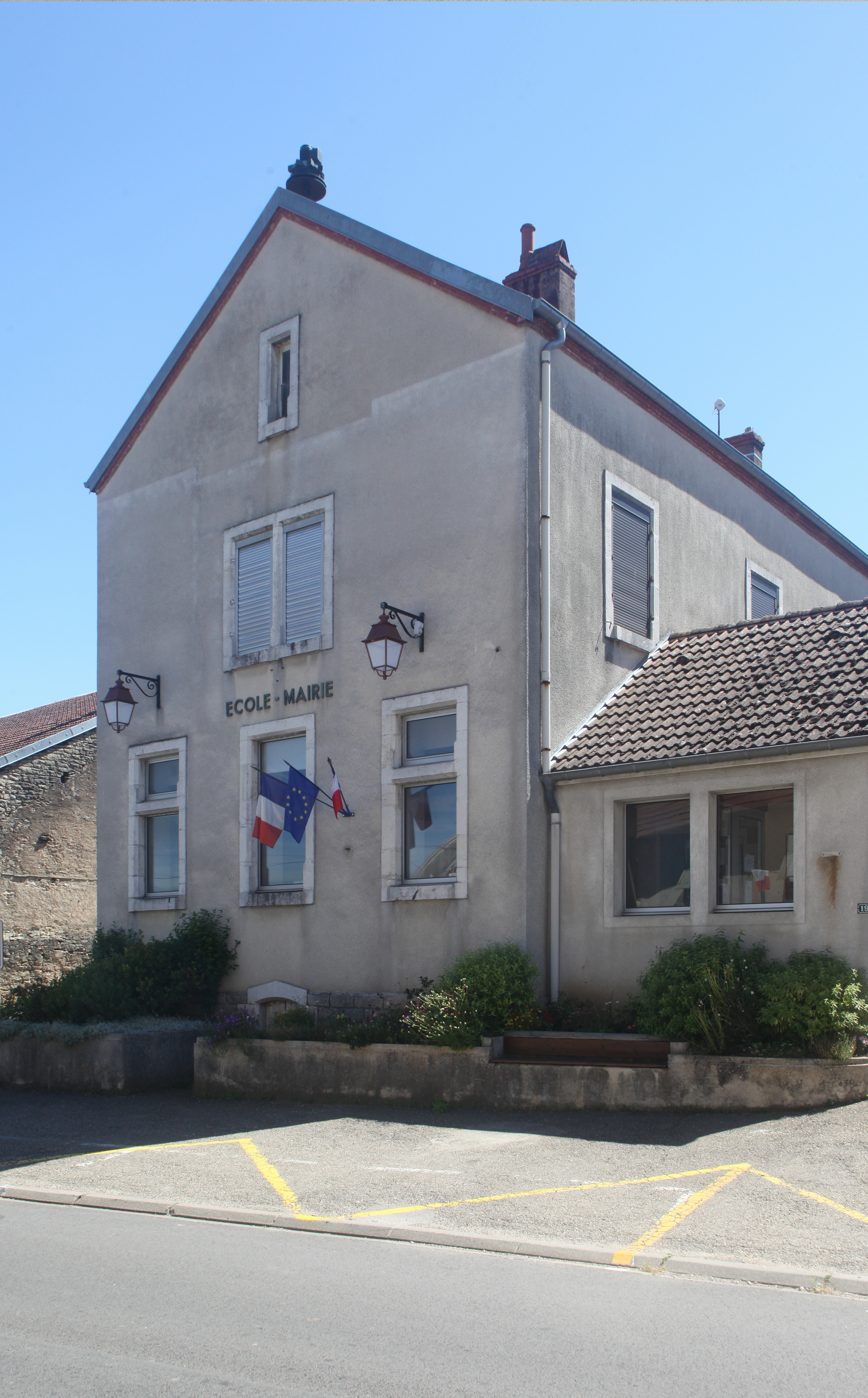
- The town hall in Pagney
- Location of Pagney
- Location within France Location within Bourgogne-Franche-Comté
- Coordinates: 47°15′00″N 5°42′11″E
- Country: France
- Region: Bourgogne-Franche-Comté
- Department: Jura
- Arrondissement: Dole
- Canton: Authume
- Intercommunality: Jura Nord

Government
  - Mayor (2020–2026): Michel Ganet
- Area^{1}: 5.99 km^{2} (2.31 sq mi)
- Highest elevation: 354 m (1,161 ft)
- Lowest elevation: 197 m (646 ft)
- Population (2023): 392
  - Density: 65.4/km^{2} (169/sq mi)
- Time zone: UTC+01:00 (CET)
  - Summer (DST): UTC+02:00 (CEST)
- INSEE/Postal code: 39402 /39350
- ^{1} French Land Register data, which excludes lakes, ponds, glaciers > 1 km^{2} (0.386 sq mi or 247 acres) and river estuaries.

Pagney (French pronunciation: [paɲɛ]) is a commune located in the Jura department of Bourgogne-Franche-Comté in eastern France.

== Population ==
Historical population
Year	Pop.	±% p.a.
1968	216	—
1975	207	−0.61%
1982	249	+2.67%
1990	266	+0.83%
1999	302	+1.42%
2007	331	+1.15%
2012	378	+2.69%
2017	324	−3.04%
2023	392	+3.23%
Source: INSEE

== See also ==
- Communes of the Jura department
