= Thervay =

- Commune
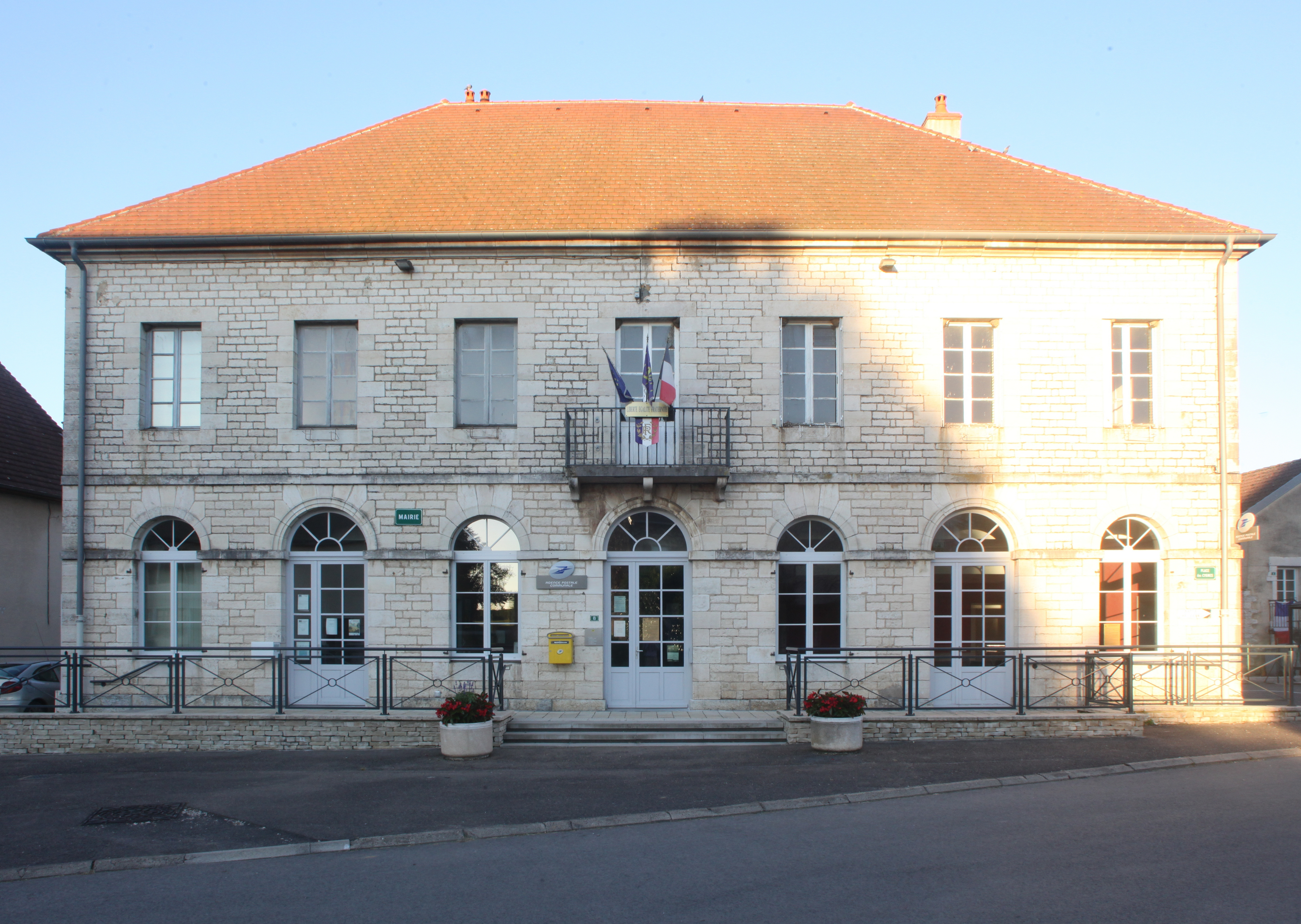
- The town hall in Thervay
- Location of Thervay
- Location within France Location within Bourgogne-Franche-Comté
- Coordinates: 47°15′05″N 5°36′59″E
- Country: France
- Region: Bourgogne-Franche-Comté
- Department: Jura
- Arrondissement: Dole
- Canton: Authume

Government
  - Mayor (2020–2026): Stéphane Ecarnot
- Area^{1}: 15.75 km^{2} (6.08 sq mi)
- Highest elevation: 311 m (1,020 ft)
- Lowest elevation: 192 m (630 ft)
- Population (2023): 384
  - Density: 24.4/km^{2} (63.1/sq mi)
- Time zone: UTC+01:00 (CET)
  - Summer (DST): UTC+02:00 (CEST)
- INSEE/Postal code: 39528 /39290
- ^{1} French Land Register data, which excludes lakes, ponds, glaciers > 1 km^{2} (0.386 sq mi or 247 acres) and river estuaries.

Thervay (French pronunciation: [tɛʁvɛ]) is a commune in the Jura department in the Bourgogne-Franche-Comté region in eastern France.

== Population ==
Historical population
Year	Pop.	±% p.a.
1968	364	—
1975	298	−2.82%
1982	323	+1.16%
1990	307	−0.63%
1999	361	+1.82%
2007	374	+0.44%
2012	370	−0.21%
2017	385	+0.80%
2023	384	−0.04%
Source: INSEE

== See also ==
- Communes of the Jura department
