= Châtenois, Jura =

Commune in Bourgogne-Franche-Comté, France

Châtenois
- Commune
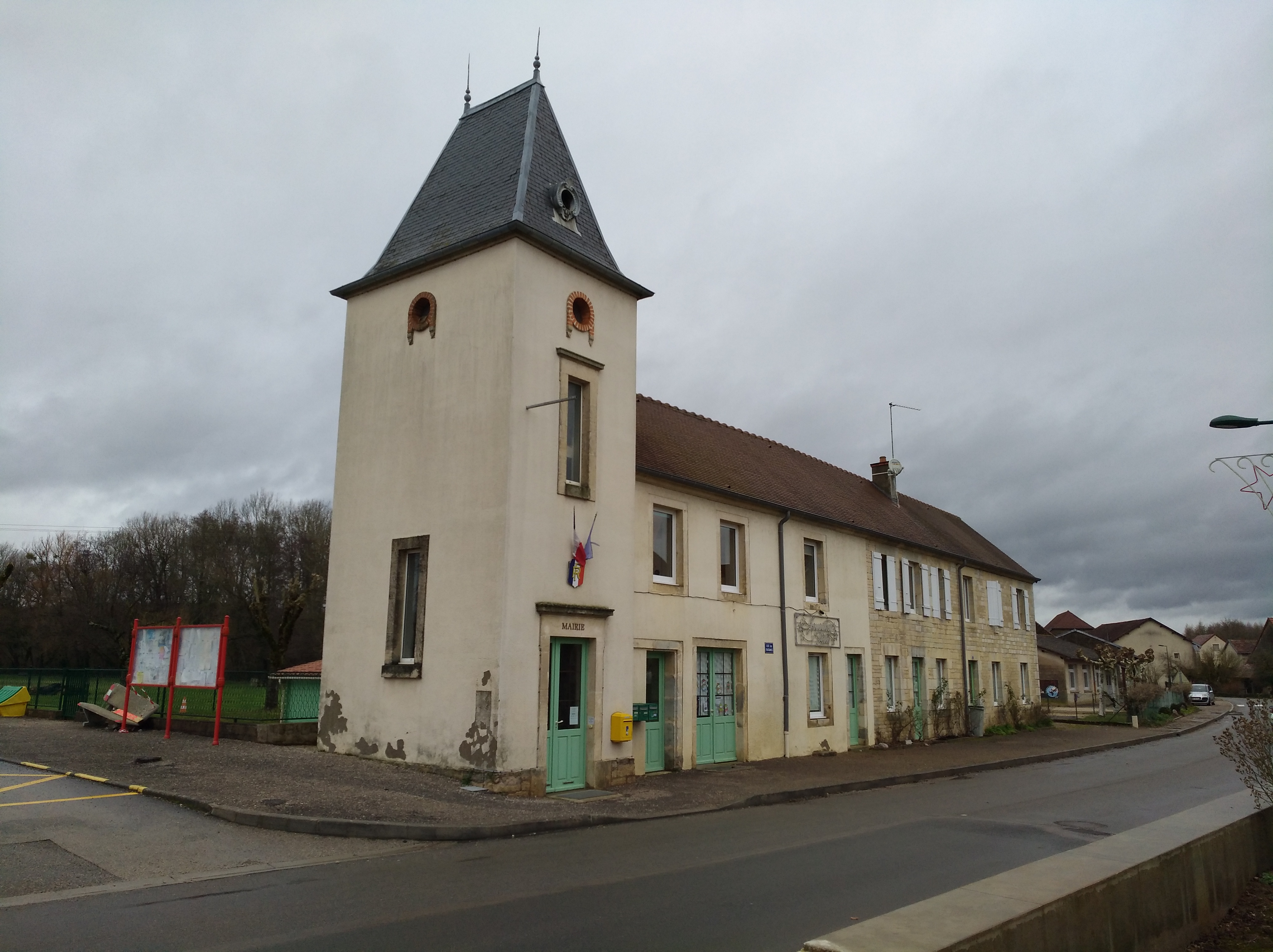
- The town hall in Châtenois

- Coat of arms
- Location of Châtenois
- Location within France Location within Bourgogne-Franche-Comté
- Coordinates: 47°08′52″N 5°33′11″E
- Country: France
- Region: Bourgogne-Franche-Comté
- Department: Jura
- Arrondissement: Dole
- Canton: Authume
- Intercommunality: CA Grand Dole

Government
  - Mayor (2020–2026): Philippe Blanchet
- Area^{1}: 8.03 km^{2} (3.10 sq mi)
- Highest elevation: 348 m (1,142 ft)
- Lowest elevation: 207 m (679 ft)
- Population (2023): 411
  - Density: 51.2/km^{2} (133/sq mi)
- Time zone: UTC+01:00 (CET)
  - Summer (DST): UTC+02:00 (CEST)
- INSEE/Postal code: 39121 /39700
- ^{1} French Land Register data, which excludes lakes, ponds, glaciers > 1 km^{2} (0.386 sq mi or 247 acres) and river estuaries.

Châtenois (French pronunciation: [ʃatnwa]) is a commune in the Jura department in Bourgogne-Franche-Comté in eastern France.

== Population ==
Historical population
Year	Pop.	±% p.a.
1968	183	—
1975	232	+3.45%
1982	294	+3.44%
1990	321	+1.10%
1999	355	+1.12%
2007	343	−0.43%
2012	362	+1.08%
2017	389	+1.45%
2023	411	+0.92%
Source: INSEE

== See also ==
- Communes of the Jura department
