= Taxenne =

- Commune
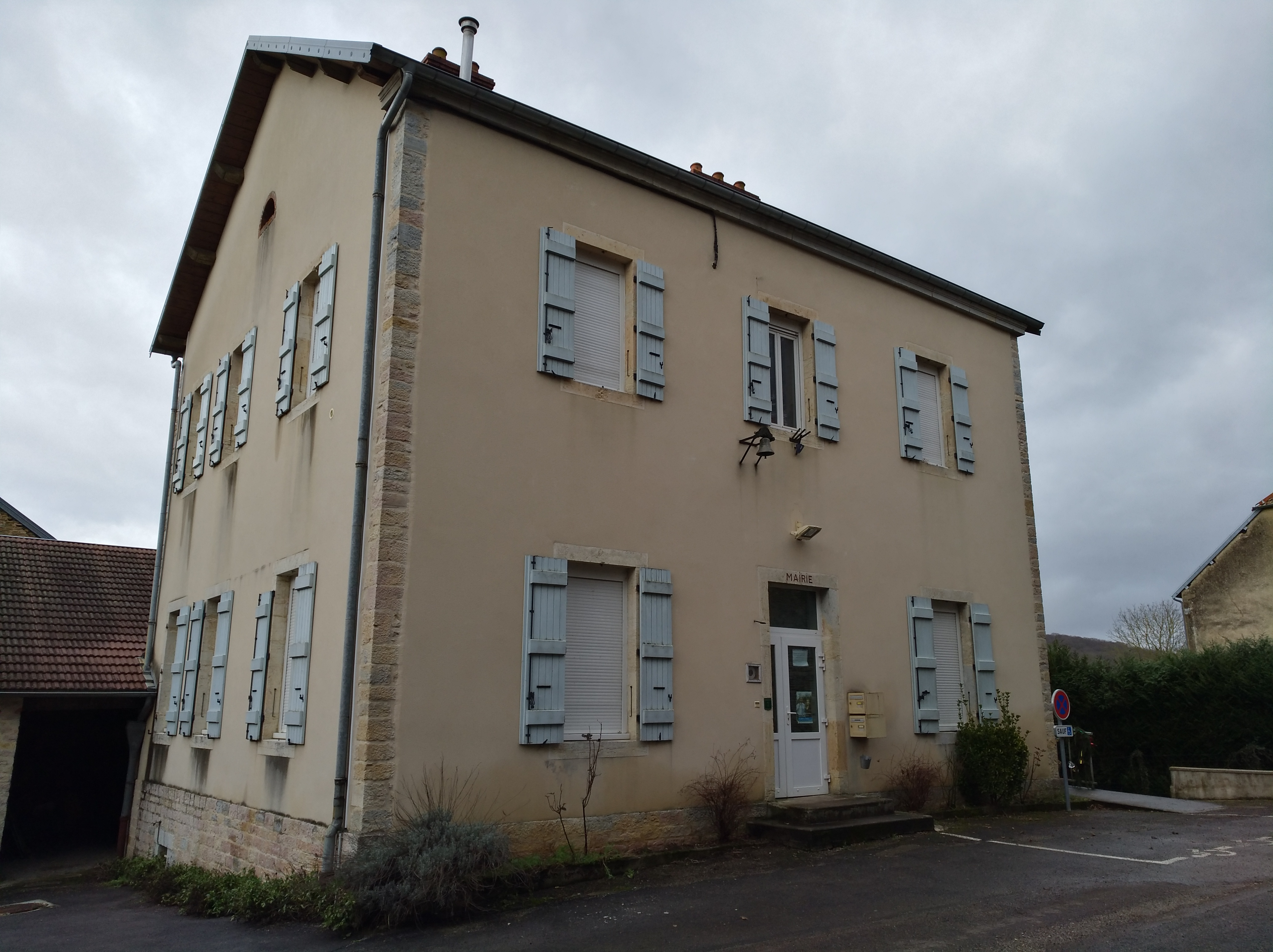
- The town hall in Taxenne
- Location of Taxenne
- Location within France Location within Bourgogne-Franche-Comté
- Coordinates: 47°13′30″N 5°40′54″E
- Country: France
- Region: Bourgogne-Franche-Comté
- Department: Jura
- Arrondissement: Dole
- Canton: Authume

Government
  - Mayor (2020–2026): Ludovic Duvernois
- Area^{1}: 3.84 km^{2} (1.48 sq mi)
- Highest elevation: 353 m (1,158 ft)
- Lowest elevation: 212 m (696 ft)
- Population (2023): 126
  - Density: 32.8/km^{2} (85.0/sq mi)
- Time zone: UTC+01:00 (CET)
  - Summer (DST): UTC+02:00 (CEST)
- INSEE/Postal code: 39527 /39350
- ^{1} French Land Register data, which excludes lakes, ponds, glaciers > 1 km^{2} (0.386 sq mi or 247 acres) and river estuaries.

Taxenne (French pronunciation: [taksɛn]) is a commune in the Jura department in the Bourgogne-Franche-Comté region in eastern France.

== Population ==
Historical population
Year	Pop.	±% p.a.
1968	67	—
1975	45	−5.53%
1982	70	+6.52%
1990	97	+4.16%
1999	97	+0.00%
2007	95	−0.26%
2012	94	−0.21%
2017	109	+3.01%
2023	126	+2.44%
Source: INSEE

== See also ==
- Communes of the Jura department
