= Salans =

Salans may refer to:

- Salans (law firm), a former law firm
- Salans, Jura, a commune in France
- Salans, Doubs, a settlement in France
