= La Vieille-Loye =

- Commune
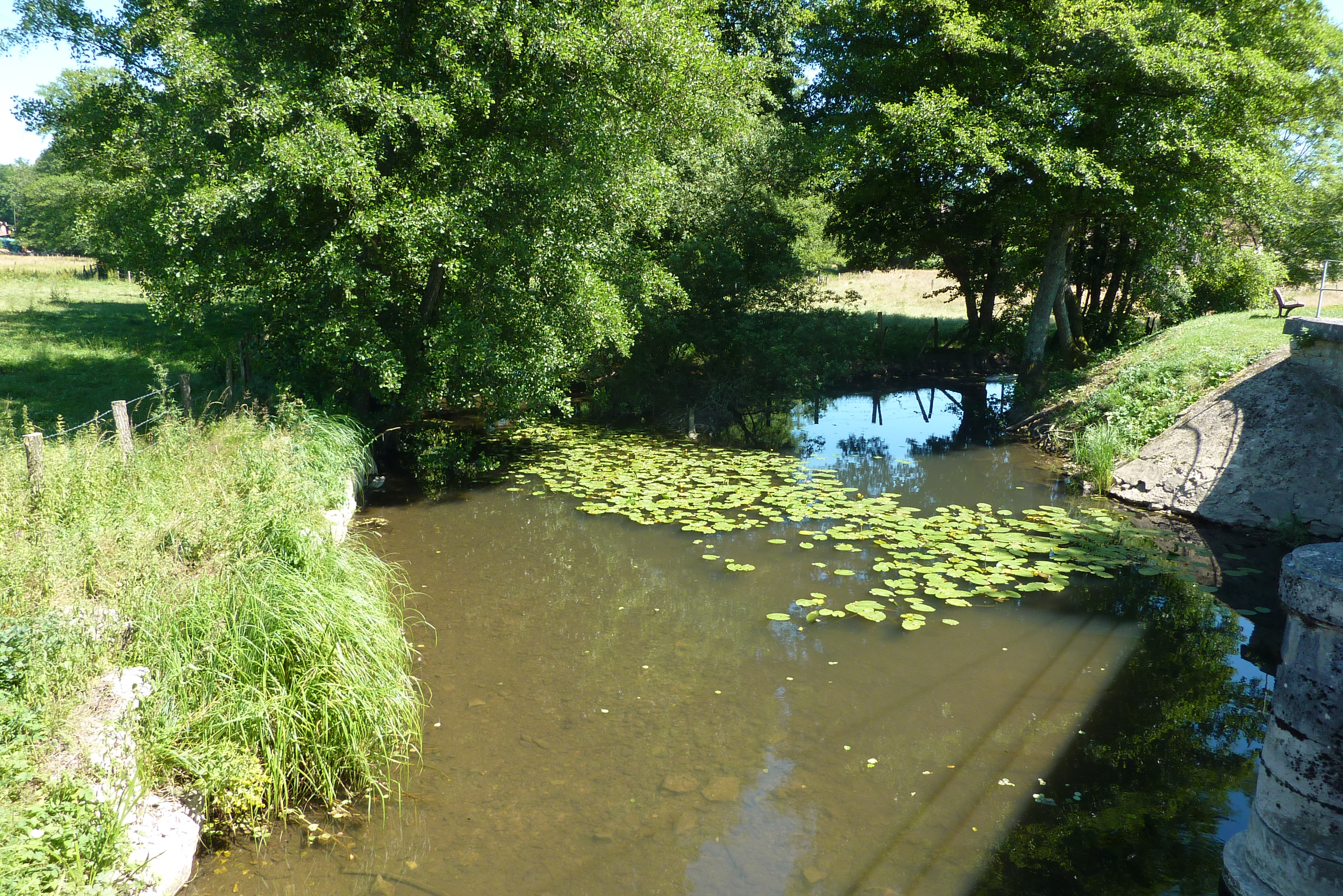
- The Clauge, a tributary of the Doubs

- Coat of arms
- Location of La Vieille-Loye
- Location within France Location within Bourgogne-Franche-Comté
- Coordinates: 47°02′36″N 5°37′58″E
- Country: France
- Region: Bourgogne-Franche-Comté
- Department: Jura
- Arrondissement: Dole
- Canton: Mont-sous-Vaudrey

Government
  - Mayor (2020–2026): Alain Bigueur
- Area^{1}: 9.19 km^{2} (3.55 sq mi)
- Highest elevation: 252 m (827 ft)
- Lowest elevation: 217 m (712 ft)
- Population (2023): 405
  - Density: 44.1/km^{2} (114/sq mi)
- Time zone: UTC+01:00 (CET)
  - Summer (DST): UTC+02:00 (CEST)
- INSEE/Postal code: 39559 /39380
- ^{1} French Land Register data, which excludes lakes, ponds, glaciers > 1 km^{2} (0.386 sq mi or 247 acres) and river estuaries.

La Vieille-Loye (French pronunciation: [la vjɛj lwa]) is a commune in the Jura department in Bourgogne-Franche-Comté in eastern France.

== Population ==
Historical population
Year	Pop.	±% p.a.
1968	344	—
1975	325	−0.81%
1982	309	−0.72%
1990	358	+1.86%
1999	345	−0.41%
2007	371	+0.91%
2012	390	+1.00%
2017	404	+0.71%
2023	405	+0.04%
Source: INSEE

== See also ==
- La Loye
- Communes of the Jura department
