= Germigney =

Germigney may refer to:

- Germigney, Jura, a commune in the French region of Franche-Comté
- Germigney, Haute-Saône, a commune in the French region of Franche-Comté
