= La Bretenière =

La Bretenière is the name of the following communes in France:

- La Bretenière, Doubs, in the Doubs department
- La Bretenière, Jura, in the Jura department
