= Santans =

- Commune
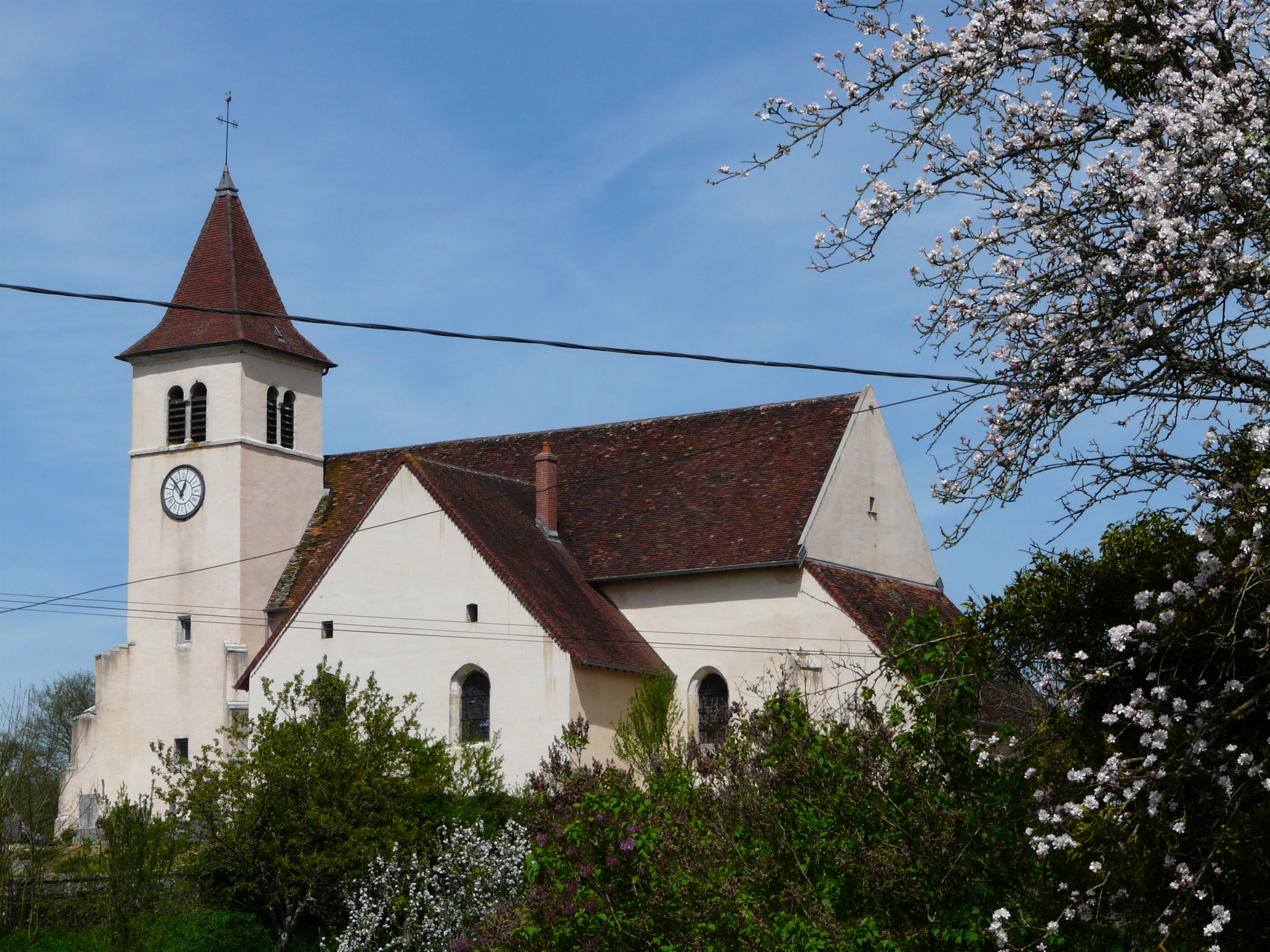
- The church in Santans
- Location of Santans
- Location within France Location within Bourgogne-Franche-Comté
- Coordinates: 47°01′25″N 5°39′44″E
- Country: France
- Region: Bourgogne-Franche-Comté
- Department: Jura
- Arrondissement: Dole
- Canton: Mont-sous-Vaudrey

Government
  - Mayor (2020–2026): Christian Vuillet
- Area^{1}: 16.52 km^{2} (6.38 sq mi)
- Highest elevation: 253 m (830 ft)
- Lowest elevation: 215 m (705 ft)
- Population (2023): 274
  - Density: 16.6/km^{2} (43.0/sq mi)
- Time zone: UTC+01:00 (CET)
  - Summer (DST): UTC+02:00 (CEST)
- INSEE/Postal code: 39502 /39380
- ^{1} French Land Register data, which excludes lakes, ponds, glaciers > 1 km^{2} (0.386 sq mi or 247 acres) and river estuaries.

Santans (French pronunciation: [sɑ̃tɑ̃]) is a commune in the Jura department in the Bourgogne-Franche-Comté region in eastern France.

== Population ==
Historical population
Year	Pop.	±% p.a.
1968	218	—
1975	264	+2.77%
1982	257	−0.38%
1990	265	+0.38%
1999	290	+1.01%
2007	318	+1.16%
2012	321	+0.19%
2017	297	−1.54%
2023	274	−1.33%
Source: INSEE

== See also ==
- Communes of the Jura department
