= Augerans =

Commune in Bourgogne-Franche-Comté, France

- Commune
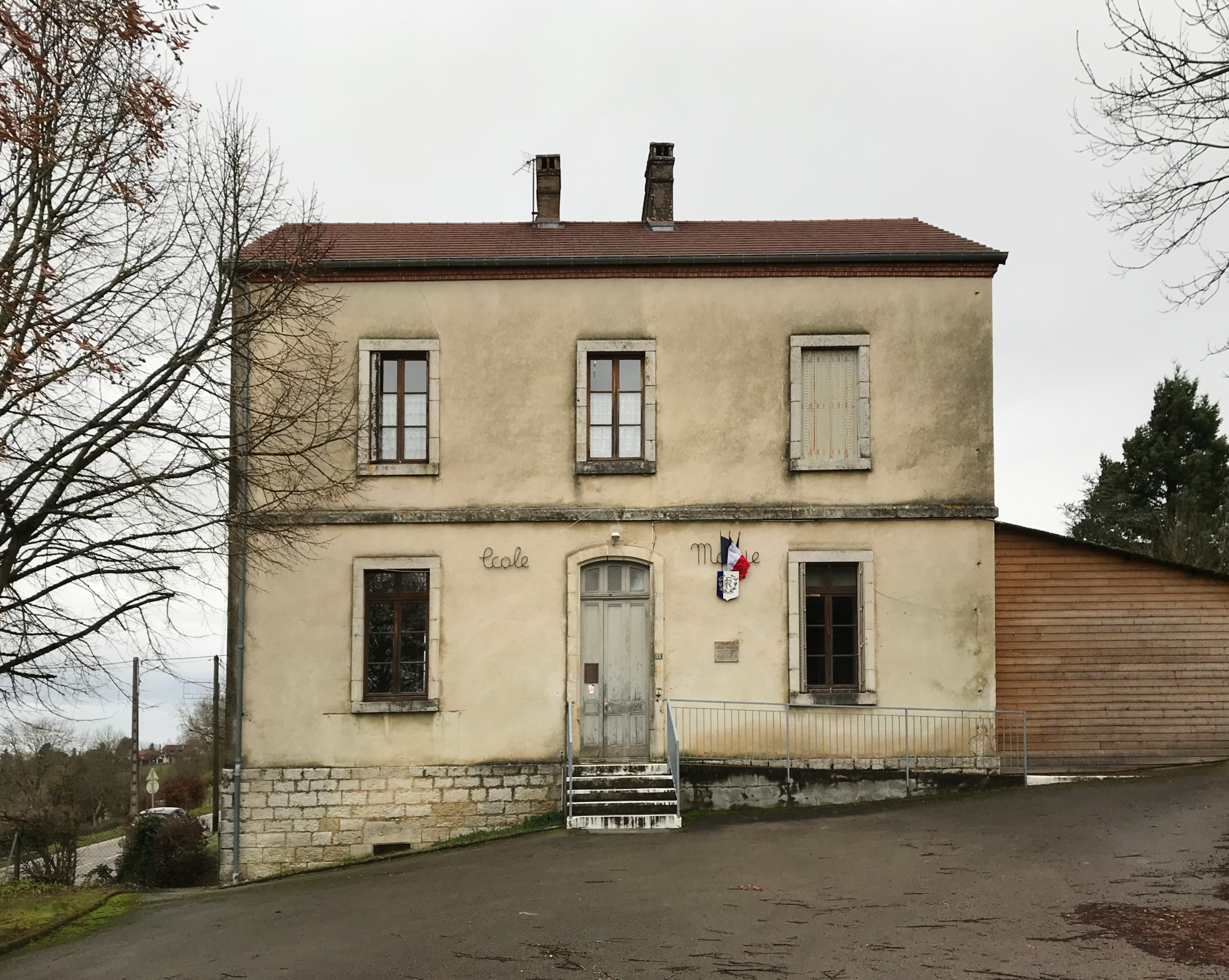
- The town hall in Augerans

- Coat of arms
- Location of Augerans
- Location within France Location within Bourgogne-Franche-Comté
- Coordinates: 47°01′09″N 5°34′55″E
- Country: France
- Region: Bourgogne-Franche-Comté
- Department: Jura
- Arrondissement: Dole
- Canton: Mont-sous-Vaudrey
- Intercommunality: CC Val d'Amour

Government
  - Mayor (2020–2026): Alain Déjeux
- Area^{1}: 8.05 km^{2} (3.11 sq mi)
- Highest elevation: 248 m (814 ft)
- Lowest elevation: 206 m (676 ft)
- Population (2023): 188
  - Density: 23.4/km^{2} (60.5/sq mi)
- Time zone: UTC+01:00 (CET)
  - Summer (DST): UTC+02:00 (CEST)
- INSEE/Postal code: 39026 /39380
- ^{1} French Land Register data, which excludes lakes, ponds, glaciers > 1 km^{2} (0.386 sq mi or 247 acres) and river estuaries.

Augerans (French pronunciation: [oʒʁɑ̃]) is a commune in the Jura department in the region of Bourgogne-Franche-Comté in eastern France.

It is located on the main D7 road, 12 km southeast of Dole, and 50 km southwest of Besançon.

== Population ==
Historical population
Year	Pop.	±% p.a.
1968	87	—
1975	98	+1.72%
1982	156	+6.87%
1990	148	−0.66%
1999	137	−0.85%
2007	149	+1.06%
2012	162	+1.69%
2017	178	+1.90%
2023	188	+0.92%
Source: INSEE

== See also ==
- Communes of the Jura department
