= Ounans =

Commune in Bourgogne-Franche-Comté, France

- Commune
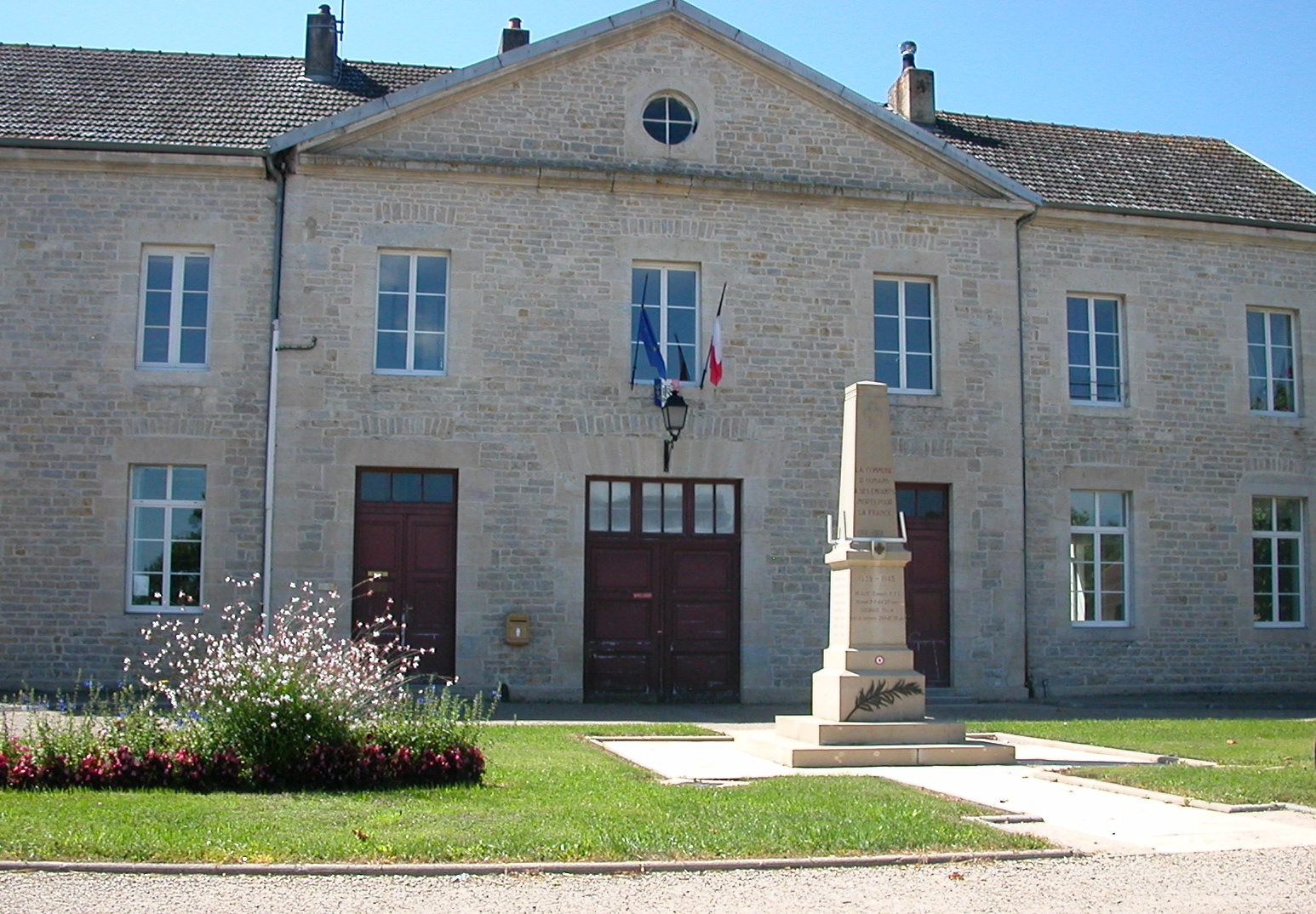
- Town hall
- Location of Ounans
- Location within France Location within Bourgogne-Franche-Comté
- Coordinates: 46°59′47″N 5°40′00″E
- Country: France
- Region: Bourgogne-Franche-Comté
- Department: Jura
- Arrondissement: Dole
- Canton: Mont-sous-Vaudrey

Government
  - Mayor (2020–2026): Alain Fraichard
- Area^{1}: 12.19 km^{2} (4.71 sq mi)
- Highest elevation: 253 m (830 ft)
- Lowest elevation: 214 m (702 ft)
- Population (2023): 326
  - Density: 26.7/km^{2} (69.3/sq mi)
- Time zone: UTC+01:00 (CET)
  - Summer (DST): UTC+02:00 (CEST)
- INSEE/Postal code: 39399 /39380
- ^{1} French Land Register data, which excludes lakes, ponds, glaciers > 1 km^{2} (0.386 sq mi or 247 acres) and river estuaries.

Ounans (French pronunciation: [unɑ̃]) is a commune in the Jura department in Bourgogne-Franche-Comté in eastern France.

== Population ==
Historical population
Year	Pop.	±% p.a.
1968	328	—
1975	314	−0.62%
1982	321	+0.32%
1990	323	+0.08%
1999	282	−1.50%
2007	334	+2.14%
2012	391	+3.20%
2017	369	−1.15%
2023	326	−2.04%
Source: INSEE

== See also ==
- Communes of the Jura department
