= Étrepigney =

Commune in Bourgogne-Franche-Comté, France

- Commune
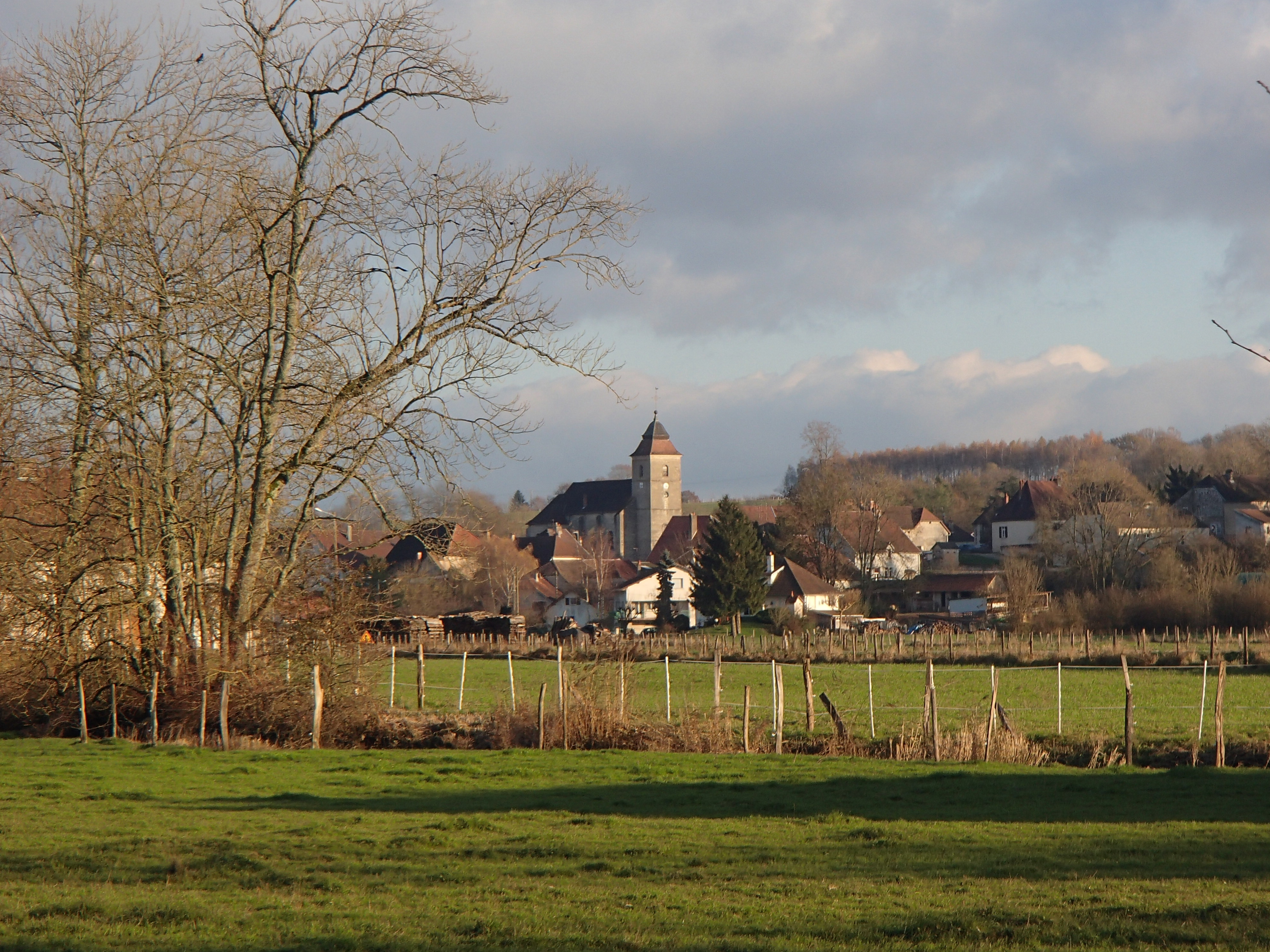
- A general view of Étrepigney

- Coat of arms
- Location of Étrepigney
- Location within France Location within Bourgogne-Franche-Comté
- Coordinates: 47°07′48″N 5°41′32″E
- Country: France
- Region: Bourgogne-Franche-Comté
- Department: Jura
- Arrondissement: Dole
- Canton: Mont-sous-Vaudrey

Government
  - Mayor (2020–2026): Laurent Chenu
- Area^{1}: 15.60 km^{2} (6.02 sq mi)
- Highest elevation: 262 m (860 ft)
- Lowest elevation: 207 m (679 ft)
- Population (2023): 431
  - Density: 27.6/km^{2} (71.6/sq mi)
- Time zone: UTC+01:00 (CET)
  - Summer (DST): UTC+02:00 (CEST)
- INSEE/Postal code: 39218 /39700
- ^{1} French Land Register data, which excludes lakes, ponds, glaciers > 1 km^{2} (0.386 sq mi or 247 acres) and river estuaries.

Étrepigney (French pronunciation: [etʁəpiɲɛ]) is a commune in the Jura department in Bourgogne-Franche-Comté in eastern France.

== Population ==
Historical population
Year	Pop.	±% p.a.
1968	279	—
1975	252	−1.44%
1982	297	+2.37%
1990	321	+0.98%
1999	357	+1.19%
2007	387	+1.01%
2012	423	+1.79%
2017	430	+0.33%
2023	431	+0.04%
Source: INSEE

== See also ==
- Communes of the Jura department
