= Monteplain =

Commune in Bourgogne-Franche-Comté, France

- Commune
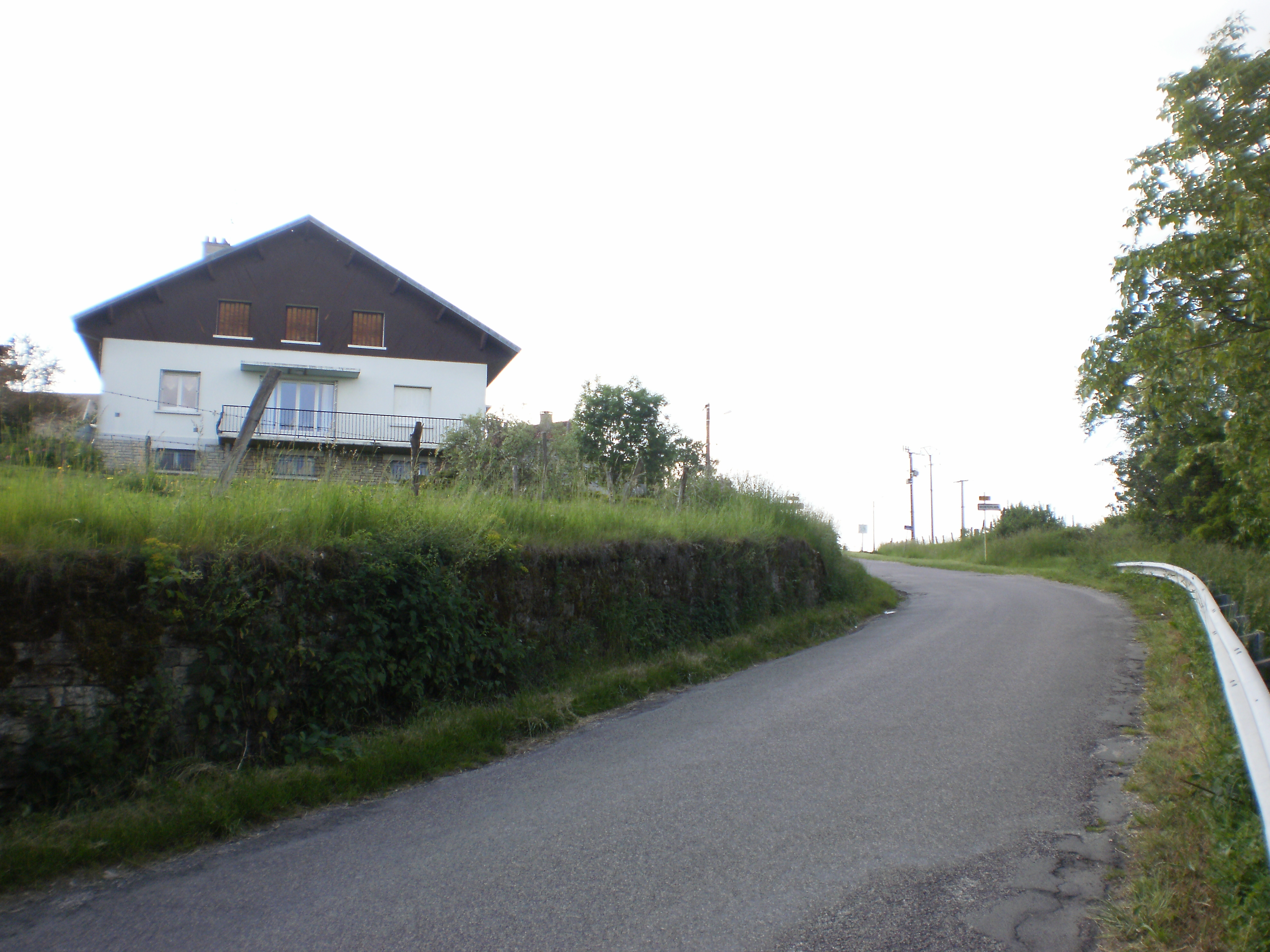
- Monteplain South entrance
- Location of Monteplain
- Location within France Location within Bourgogne-Franche-Comté
- Coordinates: 47°09′27″N 5°42′34″E
- Country: France
- Region: Bourgogne-Franche-Comté
- Department: Jura
- Arrondissement: Dole
- Canton: Mont-sous-Vaudrey

Government
  - Mayor (2020–2026): Luc Béjean
- Area^{1}: 1.68 km^{2} (0.65 sq mi)
- Highest elevation: 258 m (846 ft)
- Lowest elevation: 210 m (690 ft)
- Population (2023): 146
  - Density: 86.9/km^{2} (225/sq mi)
- Time zone: UTC+01:00 (CET)
  - Summer (DST): UTC+02:00 (CEST)
- INSEE/Postal code: 39352 /39700
- ^{1} French Land Register data, which excludes lakes, ponds, glaciers > 1 km^{2} (0.386 sq mi or 247 acres) and river estuaries.

Monteplain (French pronunciation: [mɔ̃tplɛ̃]) is a commune in the Jura department in Bourgogne-Franche-Comté in eastern France.

== See also ==
- Communes of the Jura department
