= Évans =

Commune in Bourgogne-Franche-Comté, France

- Commune
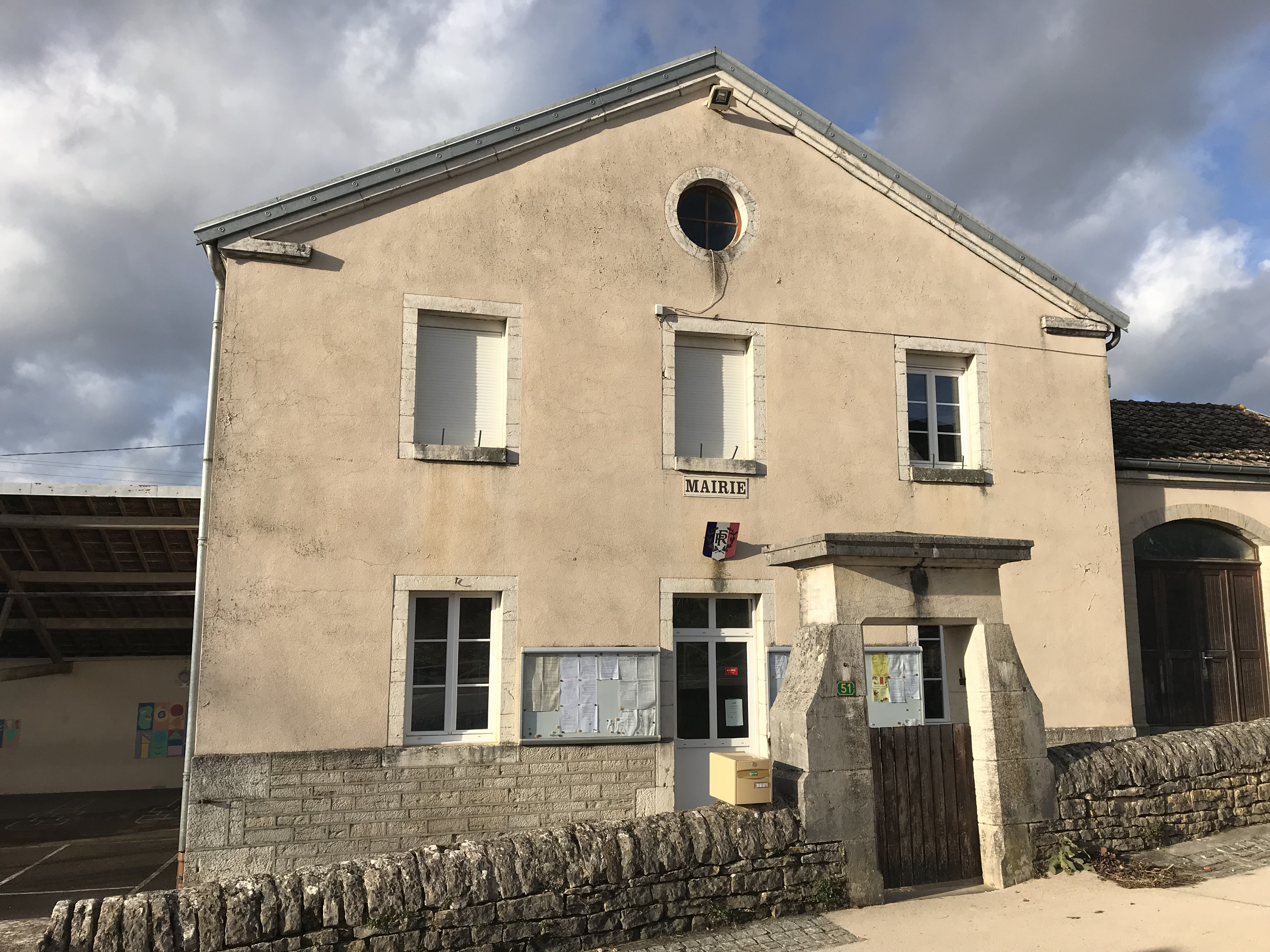
- The town hall in Évans

- Coat of arms
- Location of Évans
- Location within France Location within Bourgogne-Franche-Comté
- Coordinates: 47°10′47″N 5°46′26″E
- Country: France
- Region: Bourgogne-Franche-Comté
- Department: Jura
- Arrondissement: Dole
- Canton: Mont-sous-Vaudrey

Government
  - Mayor (2020–2026): François Greset
- Area^{1}: 9.87 km^{2} (3.81 sq mi)
- Highest elevation: 293 m (961 ft)
- Lowest elevation: 210 m (690 ft)
- Population (2023): 651
  - Density: 66.0/km^{2} (171/sq mi)
- Time zone: UTC+01:00 (CET)
  - Summer (DST): UTC+02:00 (CEST)
- INSEE/Postal code: 39219 /39700
- ^{1} French Land Register data, which excludes lakes, ponds, glaciers > 1 km^{2} (0.386 sq mi or 247 acres) and river estuaries.

Évans (French pronunciation: [evɑ̃]) is a commune in the Jura department in Bourgogne-Franche-Comté in eastern France.

== Population ==
Historical population
Year	Pop.	±% p.a.
1968	264	—
1975	308	+2.23%
1982	384	+3.20%
1990	459	+2.26%
1999	545	+1.93%
2007	596	+1.12%
2012	627	+1.02%
2017	644	+0.54%
2023	651	+0.18%
Source: INSEE

== See also ==
- Communes of the Jura department
