= Souvans =

- Commune
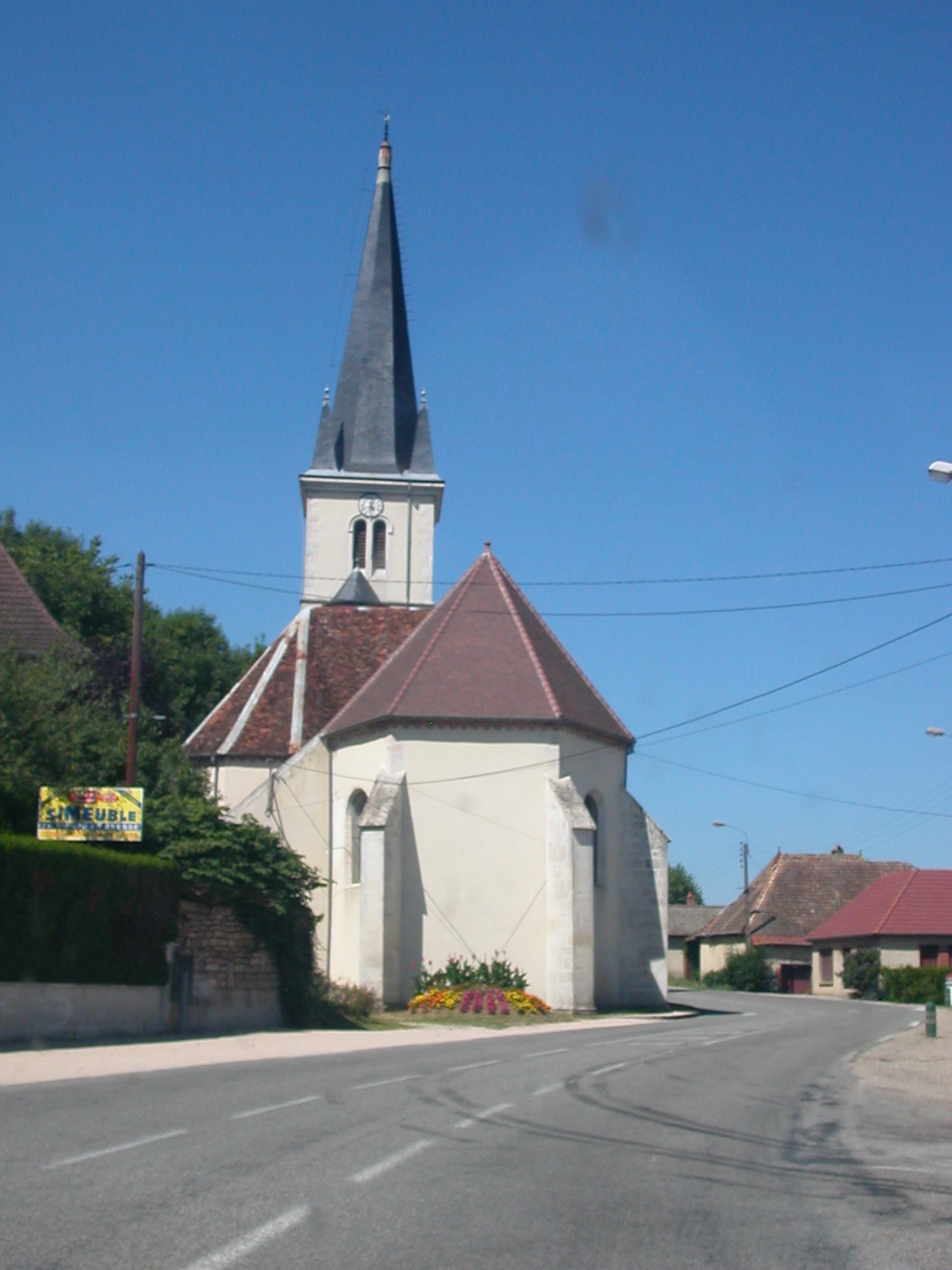
- The church in Souvans
- Location of Souvans
- Location within France Location within Bourgogne-Franche-Comté
- Coordinates: 46°59′42″N 5°32′58″E
- Country: France
- Region: Bourgogne-Franche-Comté
- Department: Jura
- Arrondissement: Dole
- Canton: Mont-sous-Vaudrey

Government
  - Mayor (2022–2026): Eric Brugnot
- Area^{1}: 19.66 km^{2} (7.59 sq mi)
- Highest elevation: 246 m (807 ft)
- Lowest elevation: 202 m (663 ft)
- Population (2023): 520
  - Density: 26/km^{2} (69/sq mi)
- Time zone: UTC+01:00 (CET)
  - Summer (DST): UTC+02:00 (CEST)
- INSEE/Postal code: 39520 /39380
- ^{1} French Land Register data, which excludes lakes, ponds, glaciers > 1 km^{2} (0.386 sq mi or 247 acres) and river estuaries.

Souvans (French pronunciation: [suvɑ̃]) is a commune in the Jura department in the Bourgogne-Franche-Comté region in eastern France.

== Population ==
Historical population
Year	Pop.	±% p.a.
1968	375	—
1975	401	+0.96%
1982	358	−1.61%
1990	405	+1.55%
1999	451	+1.20%
2007	486	+0.94%
2012	512	+1.05%
2017	483	−1.16%
2023	520	+1.24%
Source: INSEE

== See also ==
- Communes of the Jura department
