= Chatelay =

Commune in Bourgogne-Franche-Comté, France

- Commune
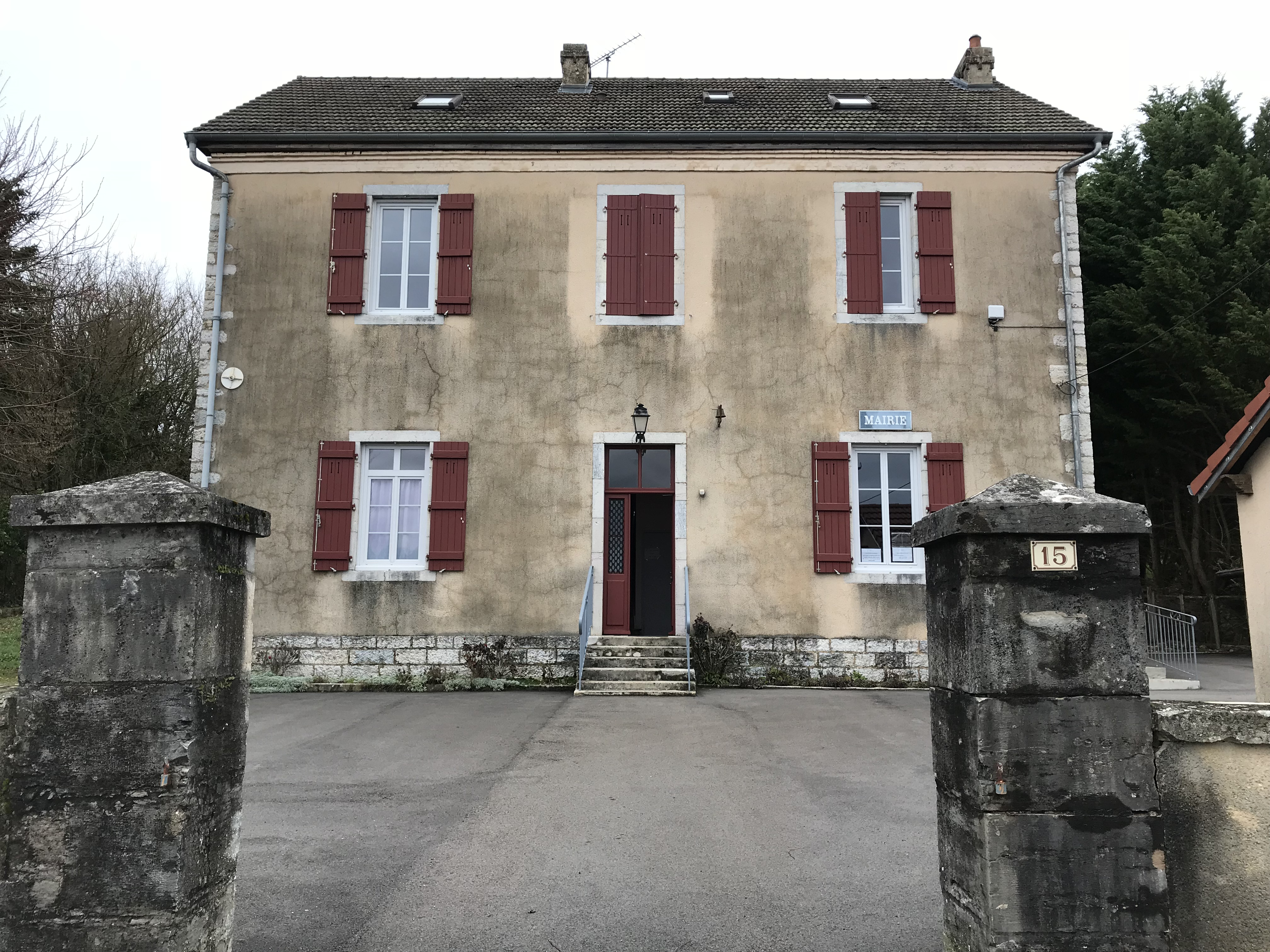
- The town hall in Chatelay
- Location of Chatelay
- Location within France Location within Bourgogne-Franche-Comté
- Coordinates: 47°01′46″N 5°42′10″E
- Country: France
- Region: Bourgogne-Franche-Comté
- Department: Jura
- Arrondissement: Dole
- Canton: Mont-sous-Vaudrey
- Intercommunality: Val d'Amour

Government
  - Mayor (2020–2026): Daniel Gloriod
- Area^{1}: 13.07 km^{2} (5.05 sq mi)
- Highest elevation: 259 m (850 ft)
- Lowest elevation: 223 m (732 ft)
- Population (2023): 99
  - Density: 7.6/km^{2} (20/sq mi)
- Time zone: UTC+01:00 (CET)
  - Summer (DST): UTC+02:00 (CEST)
- INSEE/Postal code: 39117 /39380
- ^{1} French Land Register data, which excludes lakes, ponds, glaciers > 1 km^{2} (0.386 sq mi or 247 acres) and river estuaries.

Chatelay (French pronunciation: [ʃatlɛ]) is a commune in the Jura department and Bourgogne-Franche-Comté region of eastern France.

== Population ==
Historical population
Year	Pop.	±% p.a.
1968	125	—
1975	104	−2.59%
1982	104	+0.00%
1990	100	−0.49%
1999	108	+0.86%
2007	91	−2.12%
2012	90	−0.22%
2017	106	+3.33%
2023	99	−1.13%
Source: INSEE

== See also ==
- Communes of the Jura department
