= Courtefontaine, Jura =

Commune in Bourgogne-Franche-Comté, France

Courtefontaine
- Commune
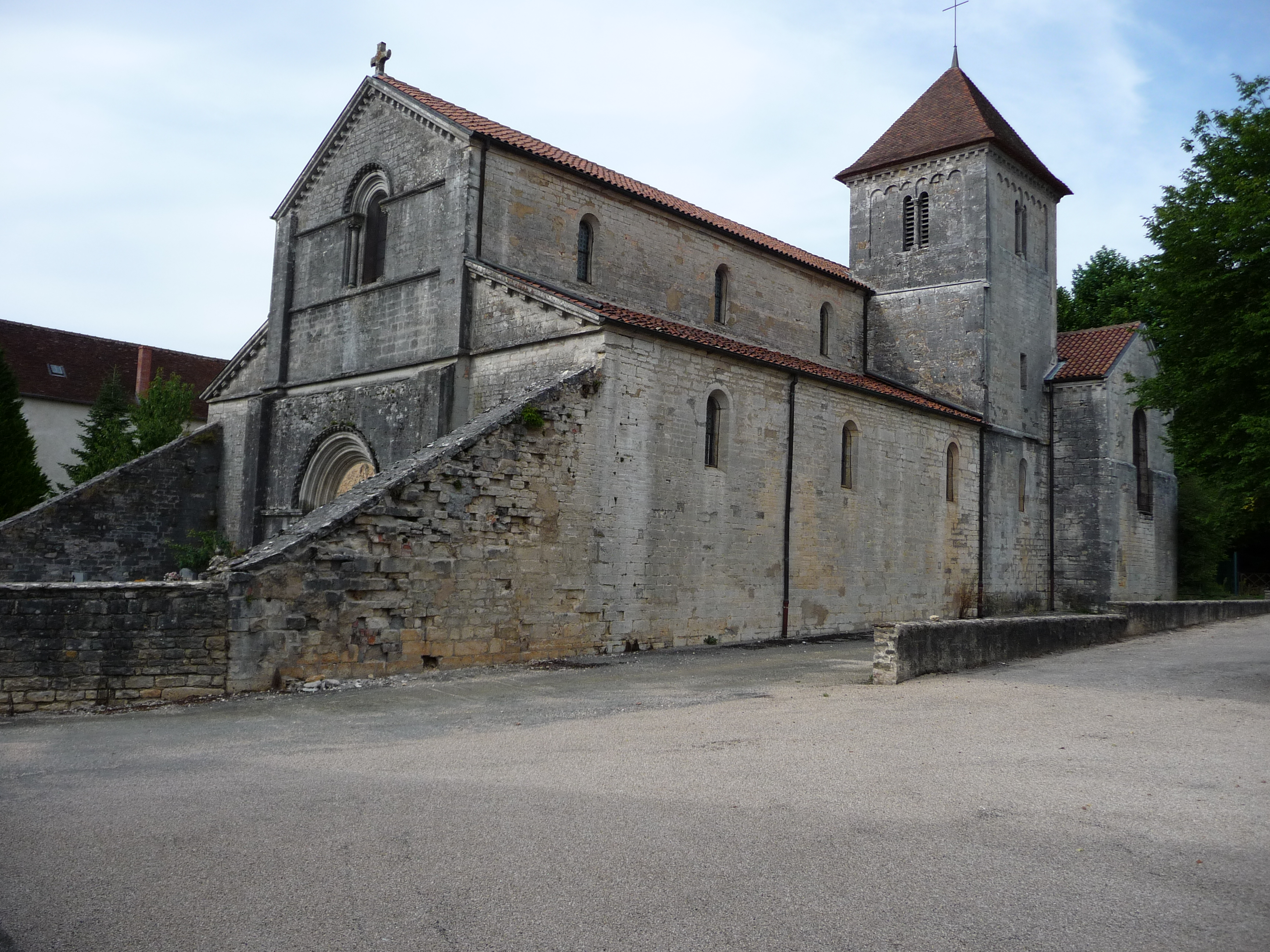
- The church in Courtefontaine
- Location of Courtefontaine
- Location within France Location within Bourgogne-Franche-Comté
- Coordinates: 47°07′48″N 5°48′18″E
- Country: France
- Region: Bourgogne-Franche-Comté
- Department: Jura
- Arrondissement: Dole
- Canton: Mont-sous-Vaudrey

Government
  - Mayor (2020–2026): Jean-Noël Arnould
- Area^{1}: 13.64 km^{2} (5.27 sq mi)
- Highest elevation: 306 m (1,004 ft)
- Lowest elevation: 225 m (738 ft)
- Population (2023): 258
  - Density: 18.9/km^{2} (49.0/sq mi)
- Time zone: UTC+01:00 (CET)
  - Summer (DST): UTC+02:00 (CEST)
- INSEE/Postal code: 39172 /39700
- ^{1} French Land Register data, which excludes lakes, ponds, glaciers > 1 km^{2} (0.386 sq mi or 247 acres) and river estuaries.

Courtefontaine (French pronunciation: [kuʁtəfɔ̃tɛn]) is a commune in the Jura department in Bourgogne-Franche-Comté in eastern France.

== Population ==
Historical population
Year	Pop.	±% p.a.
1968	106	—
1975	119	+1.67%
1982	138	+2.14%
1990	185	+3.73%
1999	178	−0.43%
2007	208	+1.97%
2012	227	+1.76%
2017	249	+1.87%
2023	258	+0.59%
Source: INSEE

== See also ==
- Communes of the Jura department
