= Orchamps =

Commune in Bourgogne-Franche-Comté, France

- Commune
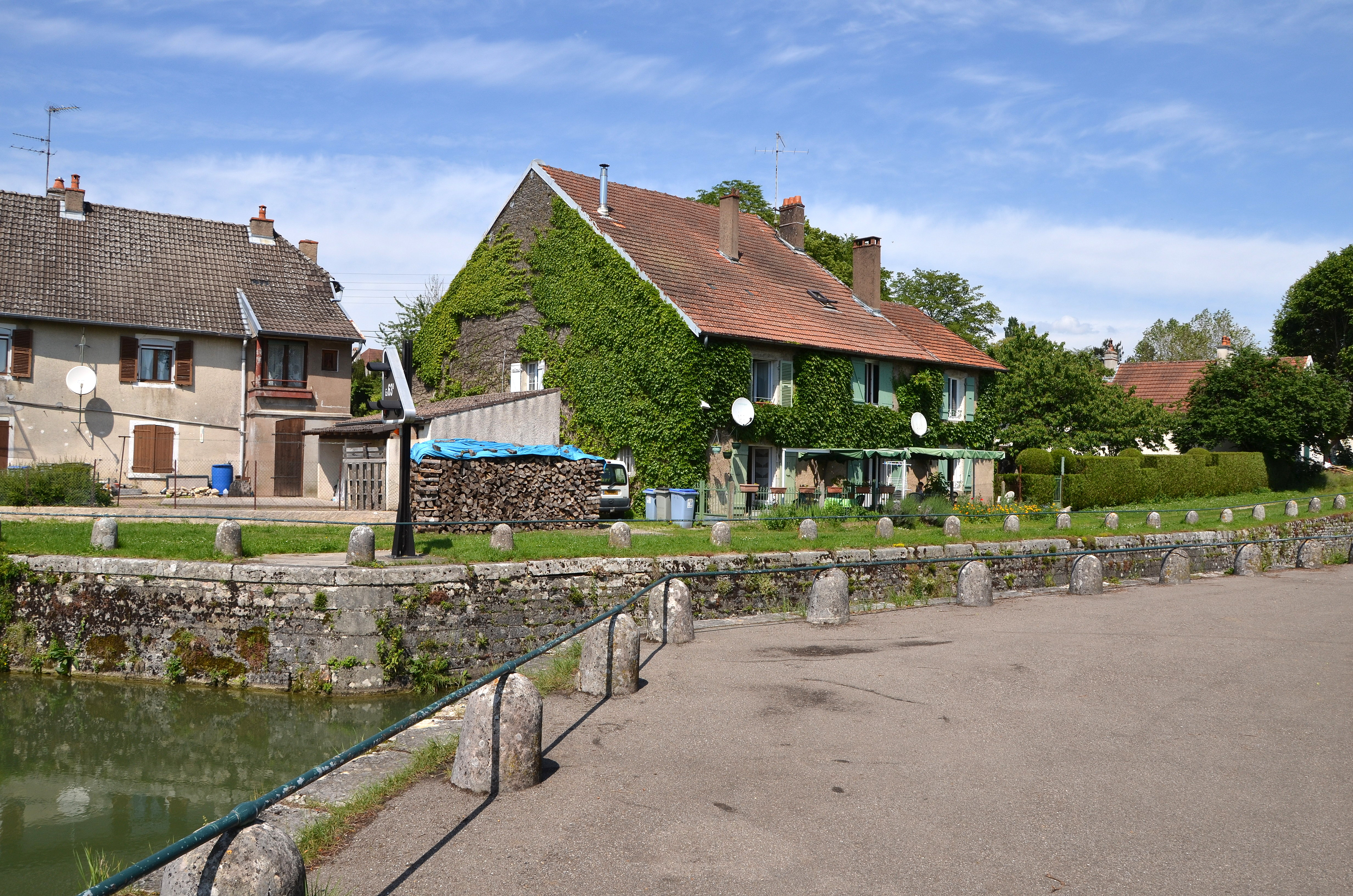
- Rhone-Rhine Canal

- Coat of arms
- Location of Orchamps
- Location within France Location within Bourgogne-Franche-Comté
- Coordinates: 47°08′56″N 5°39′29″E
- Country: France
- Region: Bourgogne-Franche-Comté
- Department: Jura
- Arrondissement: Dole
- Canton: Mont-sous-Vaudrey

Government
  - Mayor (2020–2026): Régis Chopin
- Area^{1}: 9.92 km^{2} (3.83 sq mi)
- Highest elevation: 267 m (876 ft)
- Lowest elevation: 206 m (676 ft)
- Population (2023): 1,045
  - Density: 105/km^{2} (273/sq mi)
- Time zone: UTC+01:00 (CET)
  - Summer (DST): UTC+02:00 (CEST)
- INSEE/Postal code: 39396 /39700
- ^{1} French Land Register data, which excludes lakes, ponds, glaciers > 1 km^{2} (0.386 sq mi or 247 acres) and river estuaries.

Orchamps (French pronunciation: [ɔʁʃɑ̃]) is a commune in the Jura department in Bourgogne-Franche-Comté in eastern France.

== Population ==
Historical population
Year	Pop.	±% p.a.
1968	973	—
1975	1,063	+1.27%
1982	1,016	−0.64%
1990	936	−1.02%
1999	1,010	+0.85%
2007	1,031	+0.26%
2012	1,042	+0.21%
2017	1,121	+1.47%
2023	1,045	−1.16%
Source: INSEE

== See also ==
- Communes of the Jura department
