= Villers-Farlay =

- Commune
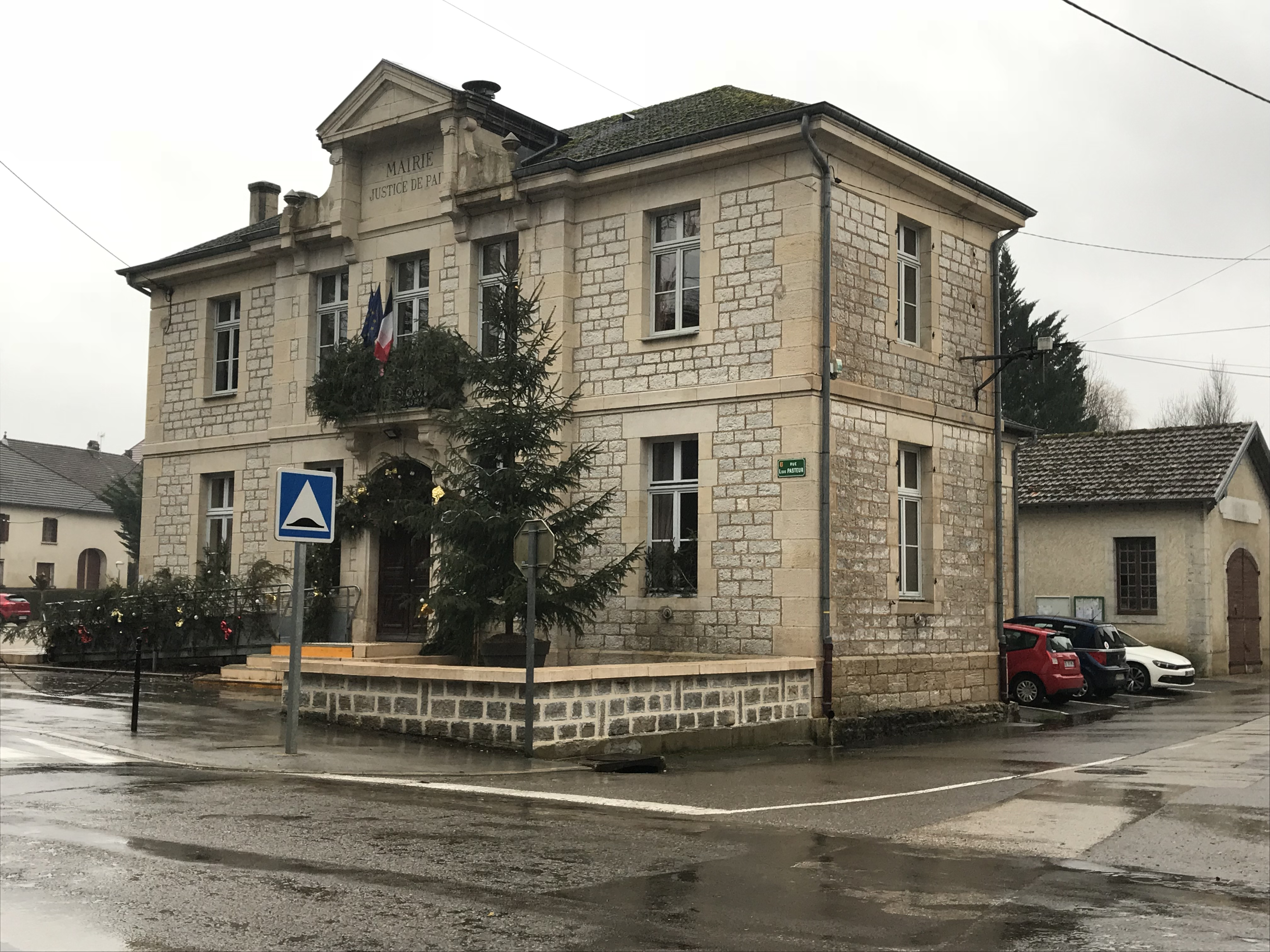
- The town hall in Villers-Farlay

- Coat of arms
- Location of Villers-Farlay
- Location within France Location within Bourgogne-Franche-Comté
- Coordinates: 46°59′57″N 5°45′01″E
- Country: France
- Region: Bourgogne-Franche-Comté
- Department: Jura
- Arrondissement: Dole
- Canton: Mont-sous-Vaudrey

Government
  - Mayor (2023–2026): Annie Junod
- Area^{1}: 10.04 km^{2} (3.88 sq mi)
- Highest elevation: 291 m (955 ft)
- Lowest elevation: 226 m (741 ft)
- Population (2023): 635
  - Density: 63.2/km^{2} (164/sq mi)
- Time zone: UTC+01:00 (CET)
  - Summer (DST): UTC+02:00 (CEST)
- INSEE/Postal code: 39569 /39600
- ^{1} French Land Register data, which excludes lakes, ponds, glaciers > 1 km^{2} (0.386 sq mi or 247 acres) and river estuaries.

Villers-Farlay (French pronunciation: [vilɛʁ faʁlɛ]) is a commune in the Jura department in the Bourgogne-Franche-Comté region in eastern France.

== Population ==
Historical population
Year	Pop.	±% p.a.
1968	419	—
1975	386	−1.17%
1982	386	+0.00%
1990	402	+0.51%
1999	426	+0.65%
2007	491	+1.79%
2012	646	+5.64%
2017	666	+0.61%
2023	635	−0.79%
Source: INSEE

== See also ==
- Communes of the Jura department
