= Grange-de-Vaivre =

Commune in Bourgogne-Franche-Comté, France

- Commune
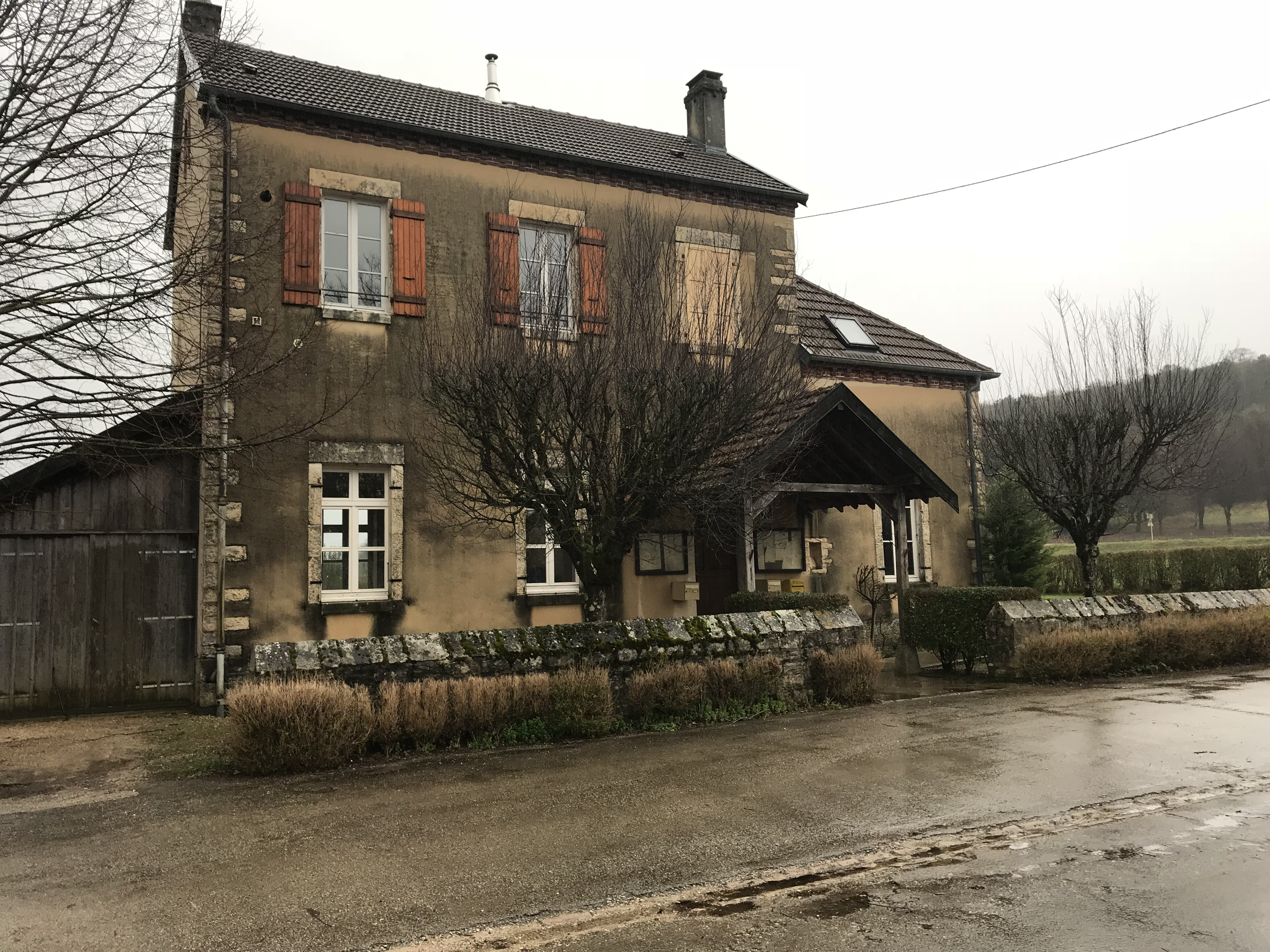
- The town hall in Grange-de-Vaivre
- Location of Grange-de-Vaivre
- Location within France Location within Bourgogne-Franche-Comté
- Coordinates: 47°00′13″N 5°50′30″E
- Country: France
- Region: Bourgogne-Franche-Comté
- Department: Jura
- Arrondissement: Dole
- Canton: Mont-sous-Vaudrey

Government
  - Mayor (2020–2026): Claude Masuyer
- Area^{1}: 1.74 km^{2} (0.67 sq mi)
- Highest elevation: 403 m (1,322 ft)
- Lowest elevation: 245 m (804 ft)
- Population (2023): 45
  - Density: 26/km^{2} (67/sq mi)
- Time zone: UTC+01:00 (CET)
  - Summer (DST): UTC+02:00 (CEST)
- INSEE/Postal code: 39259 /39600
- ^{1} French Land Register data, which excludes lakes, ponds, glaciers > 1 km^{2} (0.386 sq mi or 247 acres) and river estuaries.

Grange-de-Vaivre (French pronunciation: [ɡʁɑ̃ʒ də vɛvʁ]) is a commune in the Jura department in Bourgogne-Franche-Comté in eastern France.

== Population ==
Historical population
Year	Pop.	±% p.a.
1968	44	—
1975	18	−11.99%
1982	34	+9.51%
1990	47	+4.13%
1999	45	−0.48%
2007	55	+2.54%
2012	44	−4.36%
2017	35	−4.47%
2023	45	+4.28%
Source: INSEE

== See also ==
- Communes of the Jura department
