= Pagnoz =

Commune in Bourgogne-Franche-Comté, France

- Commune
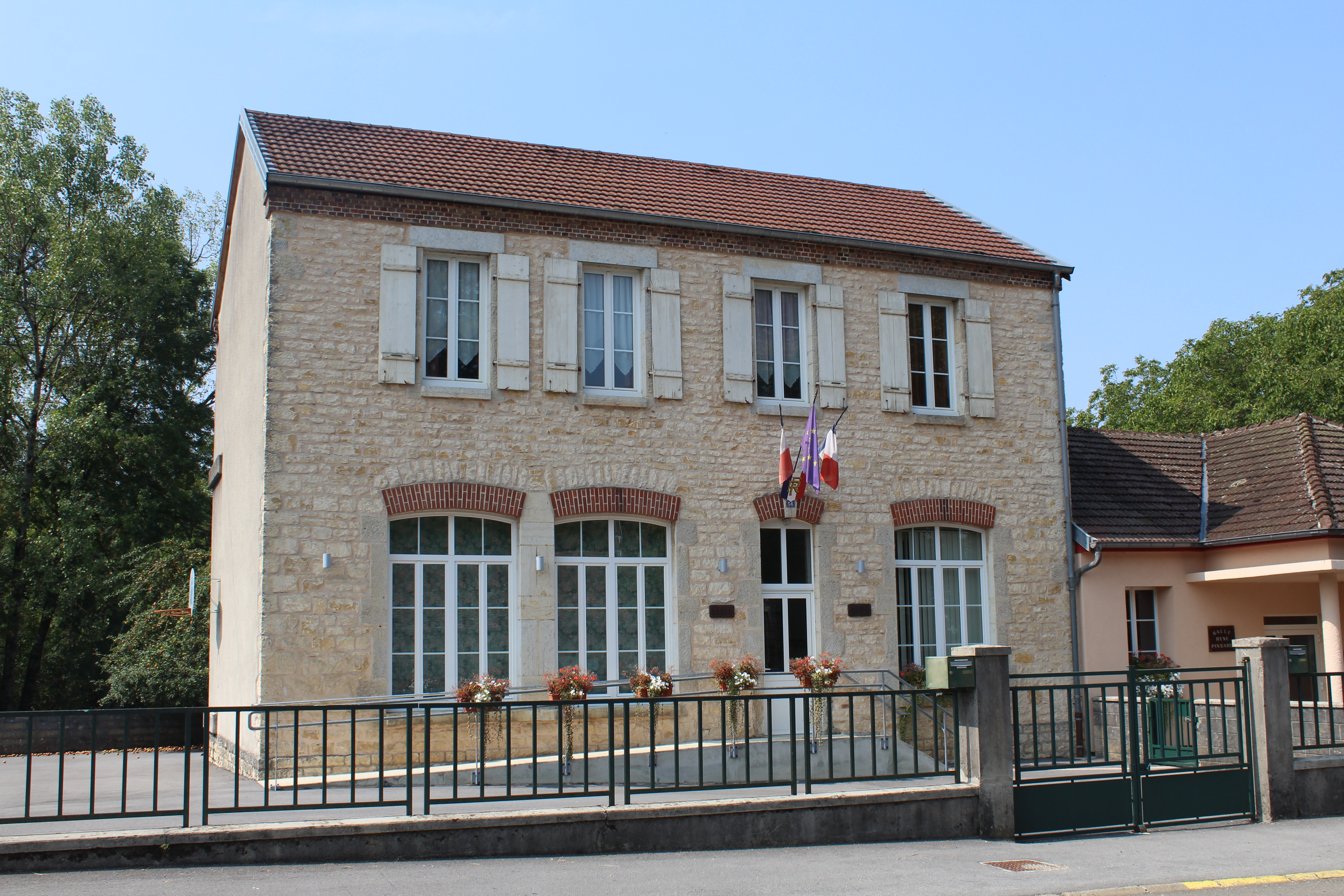
- The town hall in Pagnoz
- Location of Pagnoz
- Location within France Location within Bourgogne-Franche-Comté
- Coordinates: 46°58′07″N 5°49′15″E
- Country: France
- Region: Bourgogne-Franche-Comté
- Department: Jura
- Arrondissement: Dole
- Canton: Mont-sous-Vaudrey
- Intercommunality: Val d'Amour

Government
  - Mayor (2020–2026): Joëlle Alixant
- Area^{1}: 3.29 km^{2} (1.27 sq mi)
- Highest elevation: 459 m (1,506 ft)
- Lowest elevation: 267 m (876 ft)
- Population (2023): 222
  - Density: 67.5/km^{2} (175/sq mi)
- Time zone: UTC+01:00 (CET)
  - Summer (DST): UTC+02:00 (CEST)
- INSEE/Postal code: 39403 /39330
- ^{1} French Land Register data, which excludes lakes, ponds, glaciers > 1 km^{2} (0.386 sq mi or 247 acres) and river estuaries.

Pagnoz (French pronunciation: [paɲo]; Arpitan: Pànyô) is a commune in the Jura department in Bourgogne-Franche-Comté in eastern France.

== Population ==
Historical population
Year	Pop.	±% p.a.
1968	138	—
1975	218	+6.75%
1982	241	+1.44%
1990	216	−1.36%
1999	225	+0.45%
2007	239	+0.76%
2012	228	−0.94%
2017	230	+0.17%
2023	222	−0.59%
Source: INSEE

== See also ==
- Communes of the Jura department
