= Nevy-lès-Dole =

Commune in Bourgogne-Franche-Comté, France

- Commune
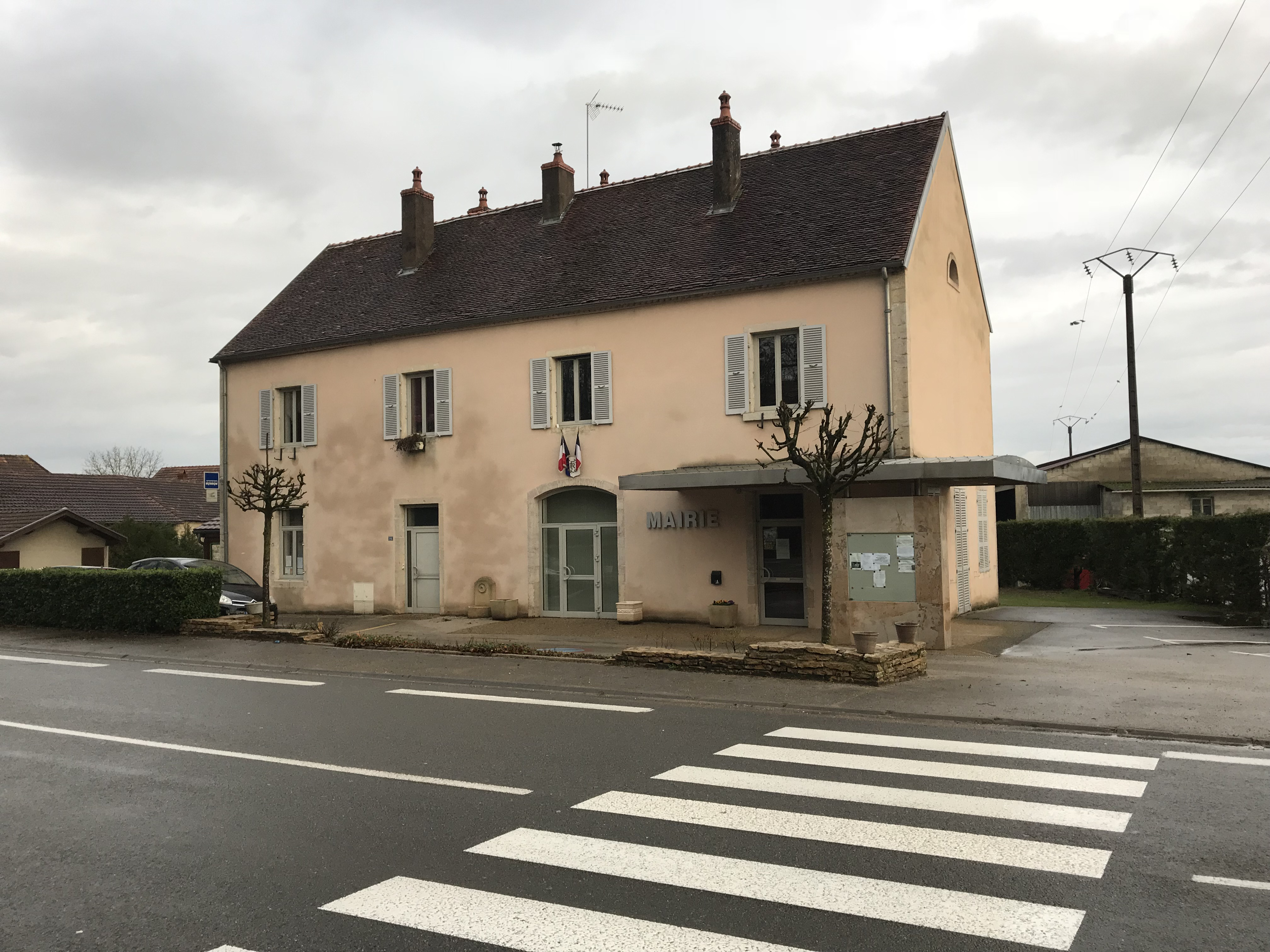
- The town hall in Nevy-lès-Dole
- Location of Nevy-lès-Dole
- Location within France Location within Bourgogne-Franche-Comté
- Coordinates: 47°00′11″N 5°31′15″E
- Country: France
- Region: Bourgogne-Franche-Comté
- Department: Jura
- Arrondissement: Dole
- Canton: Mont-sous-Vaudrey
- Intercommunality: CA Grand Dole

Government
  - Mayor (2020–2026): Françoise David
- Area^{1}: 7.01 km^{2} (2.71 sq mi)
- Highest elevation: 242 m (794 ft)
- Lowest elevation: 198 m (650 ft)
- Population (2023): 288
  - Density: 41.1/km^{2} (106/sq mi)
- Time zone: UTC+01:00 (CET)
  - Summer (DST): UTC+02:00 (CEST)
- INSEE/Postal code: 39387 /39380
- ^{1} French Land Register data, which excludes lakes, ponds, glaciers > 1 km^{2} (0.386 sq mi or 247 acres) and river estuaries.

Nevy-lès-Dole (French pronunciation: [nəvi lɛ dɔl], literally Nevy near Dole) is a commune in the Jura department in Bourgogne-Franche-Comté in eastern France.

== Population ==
Historical population
Year	Pop.	±% p.a.
1968	177	—
1975	170	−0.57%
1982	189	+1.53%
1990	205	+1.02%
1999	217	+0.63%
2007	241	+1.32%
2012	256	+1.21%
2017	281	+1.88%
2023	288	+0.41%
Source: INSEE

== See also ==
- Communes of the Jura department
