= Plumont =

Commune in Bourgogne-Franche-Comté, France

- Commune
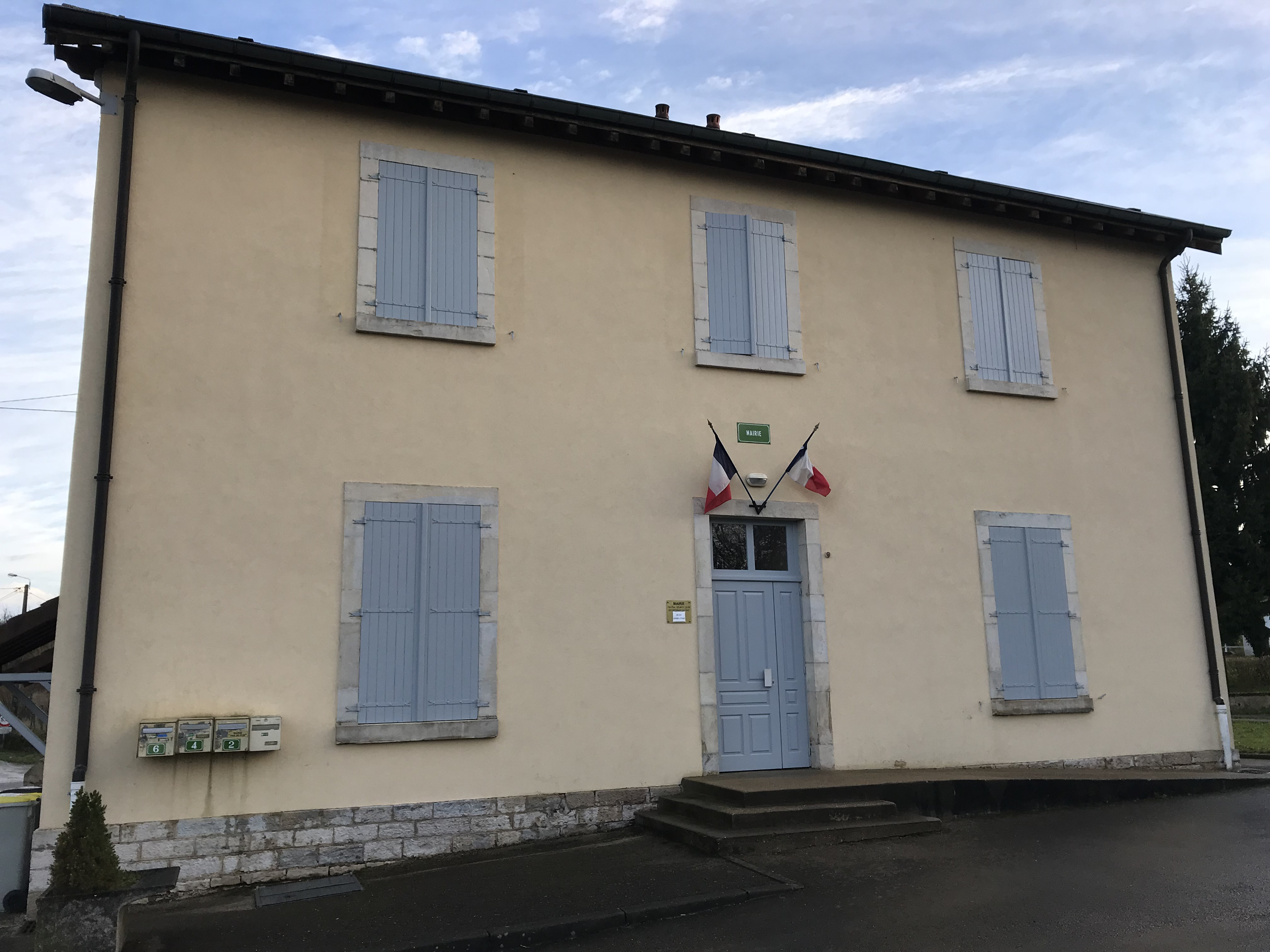
- The town hall in Plumont

- Coat of arms
- Location of Plumont
- Location within France Location within Bourgogne-Franche-Comté
- Coordinates: 47°07′30″N 5°42′46″E
- Country: France
- Region: Bourgogne-Franche-Comté
- Department: Jura
- Arrondissement: Dole
- Canton: Mont-sous-Vaudrey

Government
  - Mayor (2020–2026): Christophe Perret
- Area^{1}: 12.10 km^{2} (4.67 sq mi)
- Highest elevation: 268 m (879 ft)
- Lowest elevation: 212 m (696 ft)
- Population (2023): 105
  - Density: 8.68/km^{2} (22.5/sq mi)
- Time zone: UTC+01:00 (CET)
  - Summer (DST): UTC+02:00 (CEST)
- INSEE/Postal code: 39430 /39700
- ^{1} French Land Register data, which excludes lakes, ponds, glaciers > 1 km^{2} (0.386 sq mi or 247 acres) and river estuaries.

Plumont (French pronunciation: [plymɔ̃]) is a commune in the Jura department in Bourgogne-Franche-Comté in eastern France.

== Population ==
Historical population
Year	Pop.	±% p.a.
1968	75	—
1975	65	−2.02%
1982	103	+6.80%
1990	128	+2.75%
1999	90	−3.84%
2007	93	+0.41%
2012	91	−0.43%
2017	103	+2.51%
2023	105	+0.32%
Source: INSEE

== See also ==
- Communes of the Jura department
