= Bans, Jura =

Commune in Bourgogne-Franche-Comté, France

Bans
- Commune
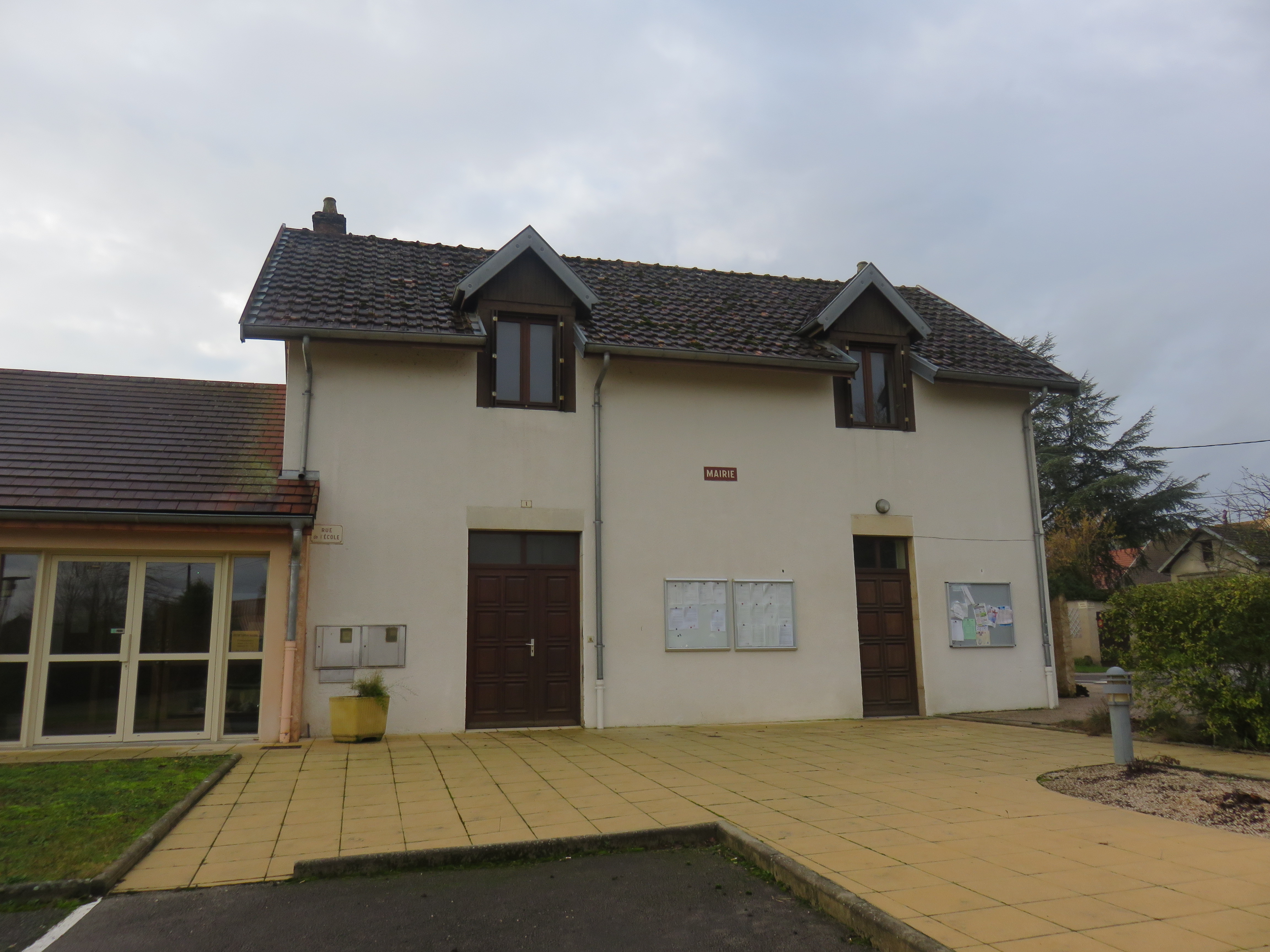
- The town hall in Bans
- Location of Bans
- Location within France Location within Bourgogne-Franche-Comté
- Coordinates: 46°58′56″N 5°34′55″E
- Country: France
- Region: Bourgogne-Franche-Comté
- Department: Jura
- Arrondissement: Dole
- Canton: Mont-sous-Vaudrey

Government
  - Mayor (2020–2026): Stéphanie Desarbres
- Area^{1}: 3.92 km^{2} (1.51 sq mi)
- Highest elevation: 246 m (807 ft)
- Lowest elevation: 209 m (686 ft)
- Population (2023): 174
  - Density: 44.4/km^{2} (115/sq mi)
- Time zone: UTC+01:00 (CET)
  - Summer (DST): UTC+02:00 (CEST)
- INSEE/Postal code: 39037 /39380
- ^{1} French Land Register data, which excludes lakes, ponds, glaciers > 1 km^{2} (0.386 sq mi or 247 acres) and river estuaries.

Bans is a commune in the Jura department in the region of Bourgogne-Franche-Comté in eastern France.

== Population ==
Historical population
Year	Pop.	±% p.a.
1968	118	—
1975	111	−0.87%
1982	119	+1.00%
1990	140	+2.05%
1999	141	+0.08%
2007	190	+3.80%
2012	195	+0.52%
2017	191	−0.41%
2023	174	−1.54%
Source: INSEE

== See also ==
- Communes of the Jura department
