= Villeneuve-d'Aval =

- Commune
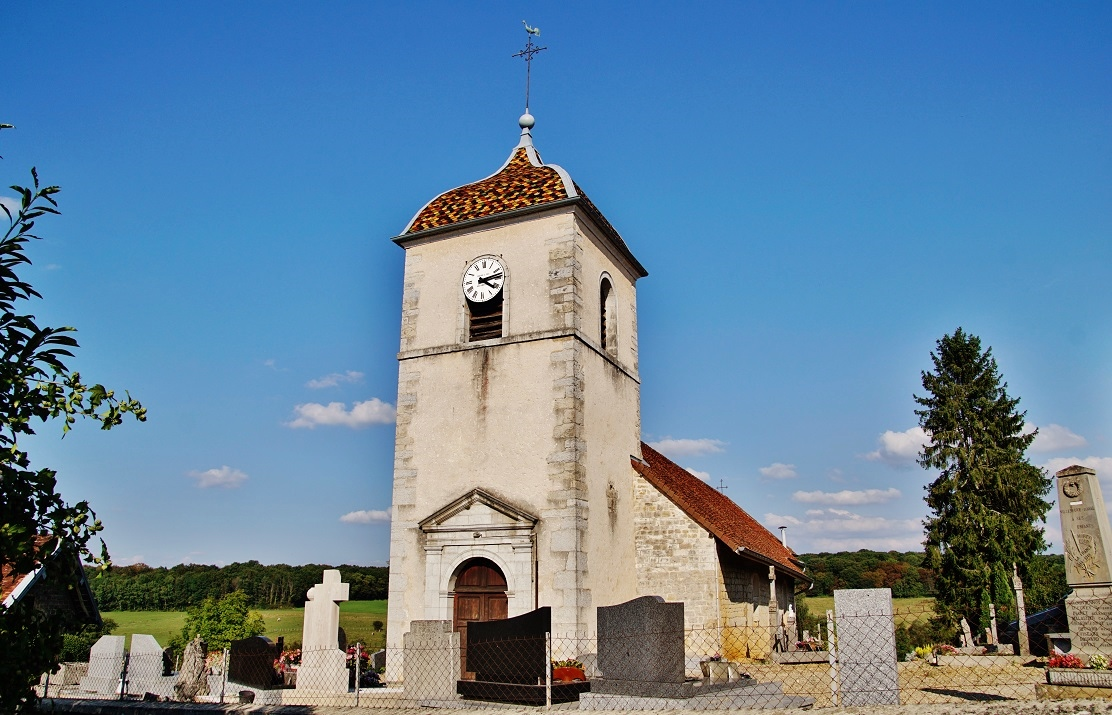
- The church in Villeneuve-d'Aval
- Location of Villeneuve-d'Aval
- Location within France Location within Bourgogne-Franche-Comté
- Coordinates: 46°58′18″N 5°44′52″E
- Country: France
- Region: Bourgogne-Franche-Comté
- Department: Jura
- Arrondissement: Dole
- Canton: Mont-sous-Vaudrey

Government
  - Mayor (2020–2026): Daniel Mairot
- Area^{1}: 3.99 km^{2} (1.54 sq mi)
- Highest elevation: 297 m (974 ft)
- Lowest elevation: 237 m (778 ft)
- Population (2023): 96
  - Density: 24/km^{2} (62/sq mi)
- Time zone: UTC+01:00 (CET)
  - Summer (DST): UTC+02:00 (CEST)
- INSEE/Postal code: 39565 /39600
- ^{1} French Land Register data, which excludes lakes, ponds, glaciers > 1 km^{2} (0.386 sq mi or 247 acres) and river estuaries.

Villeneuve-d'Aval (French pronunciation: [vilnœv daval]) is a commune in the Jura department in the Bourgogne-Franche-Comté region in eastern France.

== Population ==
Historical population
Year	Pop.	±% p.a.
1968	103	—
1975	80	−3.55%
1982	75	−0.92%
1990	80	+0.81%
1999	75	−0.71%
2007	80	+0.81%
2012	89	+2.16%
2017	87	−0.45%
2023	96	+1.65%
Source: INSEE

== See also ==
- Communes of the Jura department
