= Champagne-sur-Loue =

Commune in Bourgogne-Franche-Comté, France

- Commune
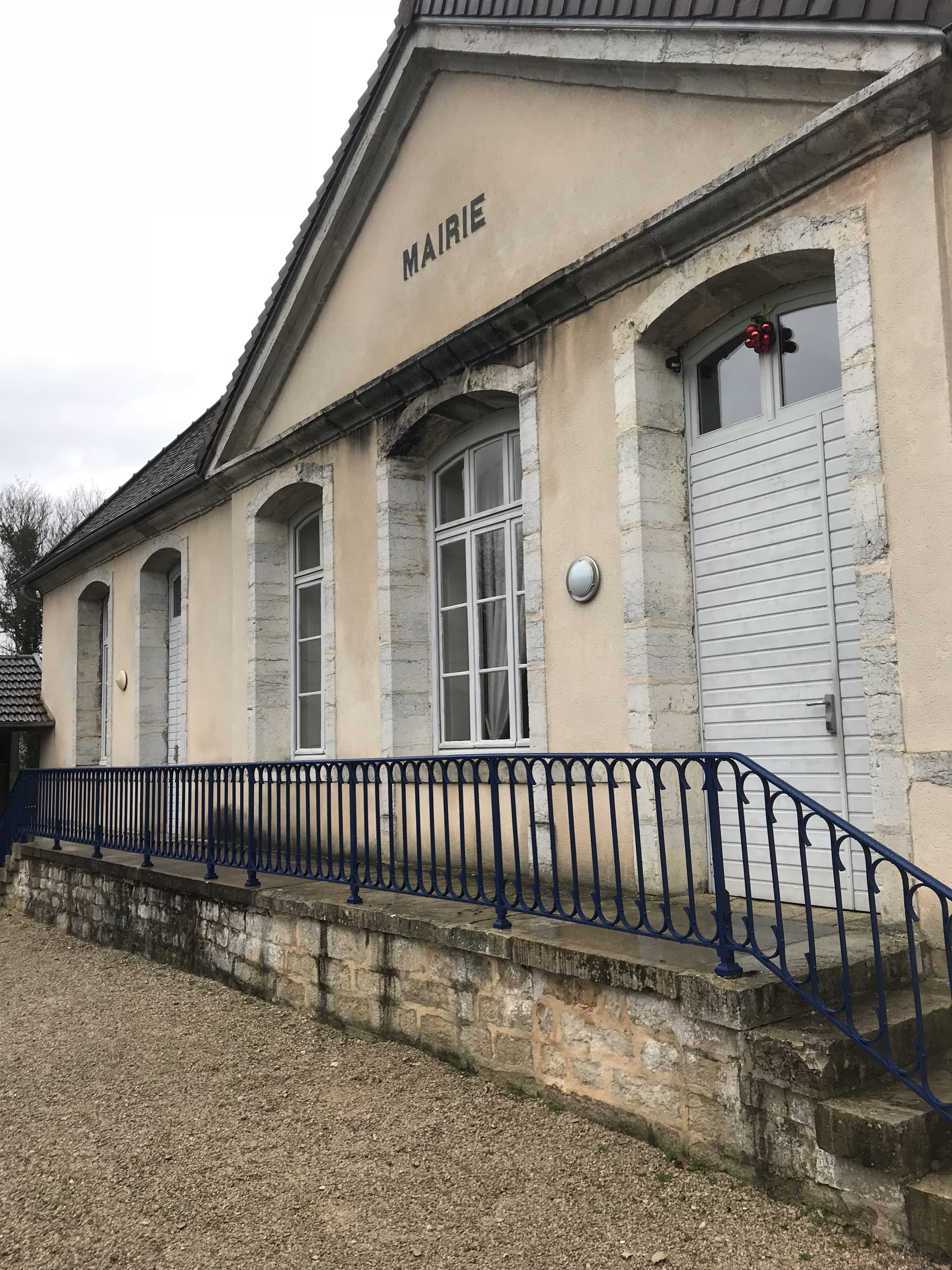
- The town hall in Champagne-sur-Loue
- Location of Champagne-sur-Loue
- Location within France Location within Bourgogne-Franche-Comté
- Coordinates: 47°02′24″N 5°48′50″E
- Country: France
- Region: Bourgogne-Franche-Comté
- Department: Jura
- Arrondissement: Dole
- Canton: Mont-sous-Vaudrey

Government
  - Mayor (2020–2026): Marie-Christine Paillot
- Area^{1}: 3.77 km^{2} (1.46 sq mi)
- Highest elevation: 342 m (1,122 ft)
- Lowest elevation: 231 m (758 ft)
- Population (2023): 122
  - Density: 32.4/km^{2} (83.8/sq mi)
- Time zone: UTC+01:00 (CET)
  - Summer (DST): UTC+02:00 (CEST)
- INSEE/Postal code: 39095 /39600
- ^{1} French Land Register data, which excludes lakes, ponds, glaciers > 1 km^{2} (0.386 sq mi or 247 acres) and river estuaries.

Champagne-sur-Loue (French pronunciation: [ʃɑ̃paɲ syʁ lu], literally Champagne on Loue) is a commune in the Jura department in Bourgogne-Franche-Comté in eastern France.

== Population ==
Historical population
Year	Pop.	±% p.a.
1968	122	—
1975	117	−0.60%
1982	107	−1.27%
1990	108	+0.12%
1999	116	+0.80%
2007	129	+1.34%
2012	129	+0.00%
2017	125	−0.63%
2023	122	−0.40%
Source: INSEE

== See also ==
- Communes of the Jura department
