= Ranchot =

Commune in Bourgogne-Franche-Comté, France

- Commune
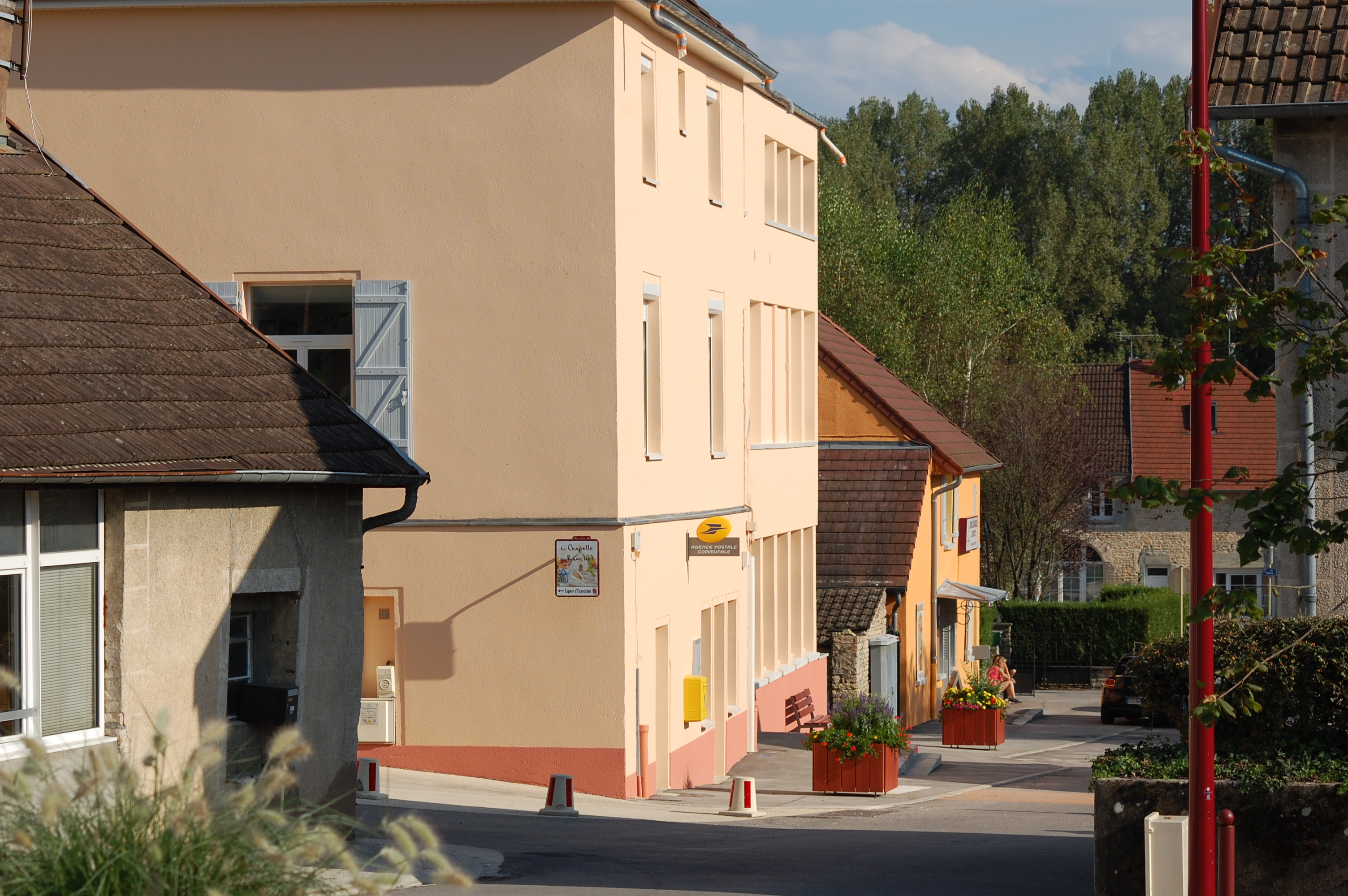
- The town hall and bakery in Ranchot
- Location of Ranchot
- Location within France Location within Bourgogne-Franche-Comté
- Coordinates: 47°09′03″N 5°43′23″E
- Country: France
- Region: Bourgogne-Franche-Comté
- Department: Jura
- Arrondissement: Dole
- Canton: Mont-sous-Vaudrey

Government
  - Mayor (2020–2026): Séverine Deville
- Area^{1}: 6.91 km^{2} (2.67 sq mi)
- Highest elevation: 262 m (860 ft)
- Lowest elevation: 209 m (686 ft)
- Population (2023): 517
  - Density: 74.8/km^{2} (194/sq mi)
- Time zone: UTC+01:00 (CET)
  - Summer (DST): UTC+02:00 (CEST)
- INSEE/Postal code: 39451 /39700
- ^{1} French Land Register data, which excludes lakes, ponds, glaciers > 1 km^{2} (0.386 sq mi or 247 acres) and river estuaries.

Ranchot (French pronunciation: [ʁɑ̃ʃo]) is a commune in the Jura department in the Bourgogne-Franche-Comté region in eastern France.

== Geography ==
Ranchot is a small Jura village on the Doubs river. It is situated on the D673 (previously Route nationale 73) between Dole and Besançon, 5 km from the A36 autoroute junction 2.1.

== Population ==
Historical population
Year	Pop.	±% p.a.
1968	331	—
1975	356	+1.05%
1982	331	−1.03%
1990	348	+0.63%
1999	439	+2.61%
2007	480	+1.12%
2012	480	+0.00%
2017	495	+0.62%
2023	517	+0.73%
Source: INSEE

== History ==
There is evidence of Gallo-Roman occupation (Roman roads in certain fields in the commune). In the 13th century, Ranchot was made a dependency of Rans. The village was devastated by wars and plague in the 16th and 17th centuries.

== See also ==
- Communes of the Jura department
