= Belmont, Jura =

Commune in Bourgogne-Franche-Comté, France

Belmont
- Commune
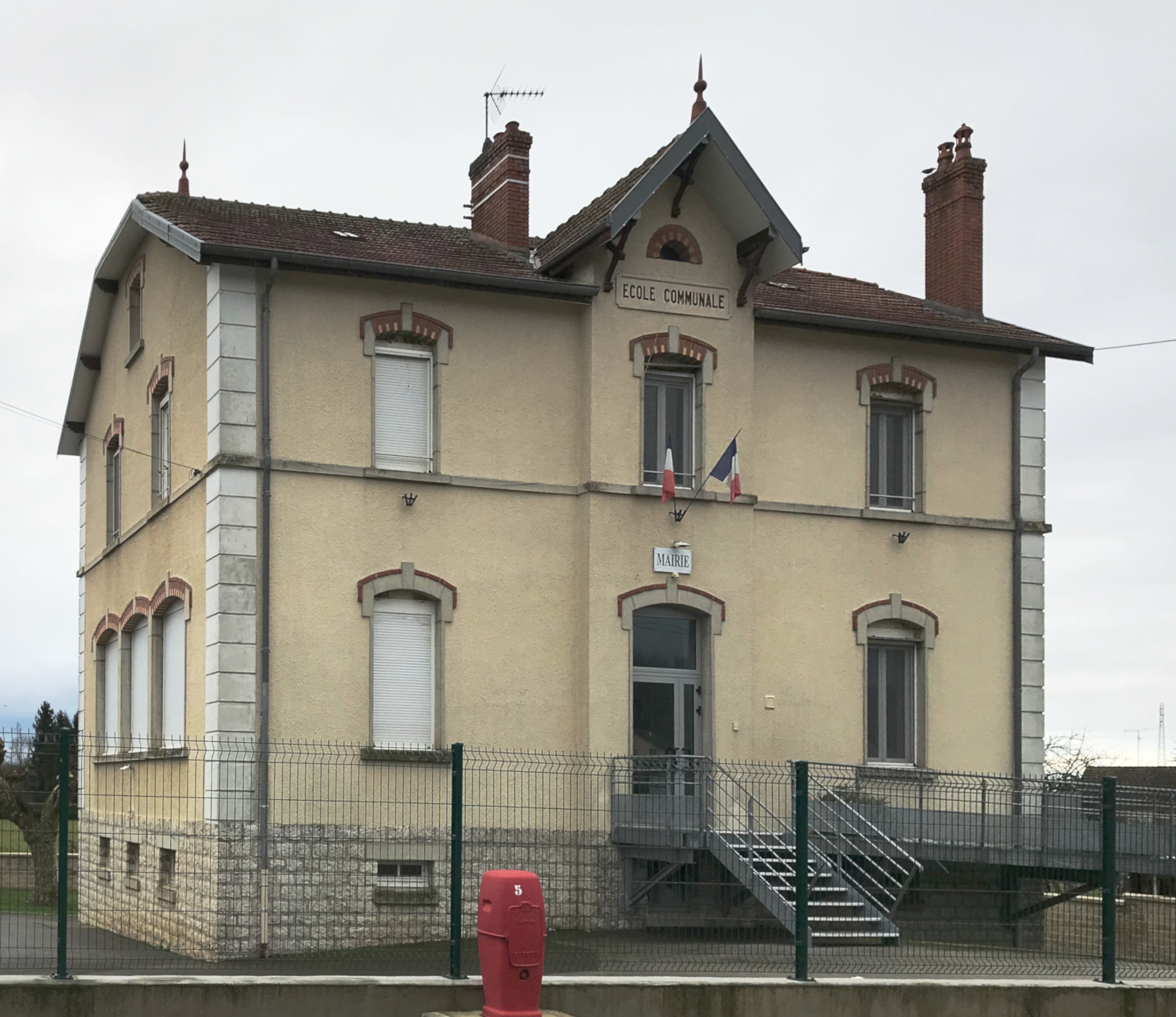
- The town hall in Belmont
- Location of Belmont
- Location within France Location within Bourgogne-Franche-Comté
- Coordinates: 47°01′01″N 5°35′41″E
- Country: France
- Region: Bourgogne-Franche-Comté
- Department: Jura
- Arrondissement: Dole
- Canton: Mont-sous-Vaudrey

Government
  - Mayor (2020–2026): Philippe Degay
- Area^{1}: 16.06 km^{2} (6.20 sq mi)
- Highest elevation: 249 m (817 ft)
- Lowest elevation: 207 m (679 ft)
- Population (2023): 258
  - Density: 16.1/km^{2} (41.6/sq mi)
- Time zone: UTC+01:00 (CET)
  - Summer (DST): UTC+02:00 (CEST)
- INSEE/Postal code: 39048 /39380
- ^{1} French Land Register data, which excludes lakes, ponds, glaciers > 1 km^{2} (0.386 sq mi or 247 acres) and river estuaries.

Belmont (French pronunciation: [bɛlmɔ̃]) is a commune in the Jura department in the region of Bourgogne-Franche-Comté in eastern France.

== Population ==
Historical population
Year	Pop.	±% p.a.
1968	146	—
1975	163	+1.59%
1982	202	+3.11%
1990	254	+2.90%
1999	257	+0.13%
2007	239	−0.90%
2012	290	+3.94%
2017	262	−2.01%
2023	258	−0.26%
Source: INSEE

== See also ==
- Communes of the Jura department
