= Canton of Mont-sous-Vaudrey =

Canton of France

Coordinates: 46.98°N 5.60°E

The canton of Mont-sous-Vaudrey is an administrative division of the Jura department, eastern France. It was created at the French canton reorganisation which came into effect in March 2015. Its seat is in Mont-sous-Vaudrey.

It consists of the following communes:

1. Augerans
2. Bans
3. La Barre
4. Belmont
5. La Bretenière
6. Chamblay
7. Champagne-sur-Loue
8. Chatelay
9. Chissey-sur-Loue
10. Courtefontaine
11. Cramans
12. Dampierre
13. Écleux
14. Étrepigney
15. Évans
16. Fraisans
17. Germigney
18. Grange-de-Vaivre
19. La Loye
20. Montbarrey
21. Monteplain
22. Mont-sous-Vaudrey
23. Mouchard
24. Nevy-lès-Dole
25. Orchamps
26. Ounans
27. Our
28. Pagnoz
29. Plumont
30. Port-Lesney
31. Ranchot
32. Rans
33. Salans
34. Santans
35. Souvans
36. Vaudrey
37. La Vieille-Loye
38. Villeneuve-d'Aval
39. Villers-Farlay
