= Vaudrey =

- Commune
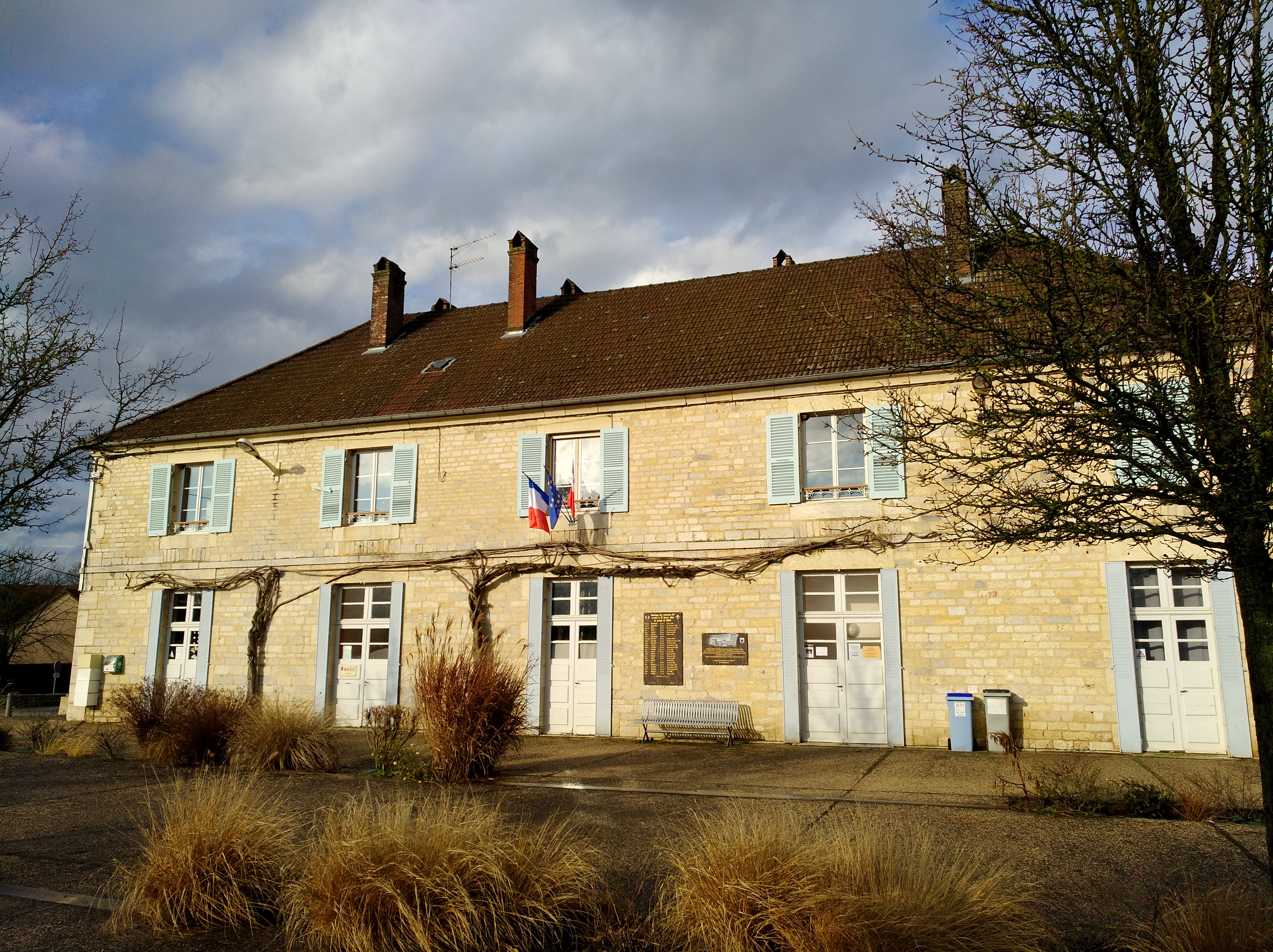
- The town hall in Vaudrey

- Coat of arms
- Location of Vaudrey
- Location within France Location within Bourgogne-Franche-Comté
- Coordinates: 46°58′48″N 5°37′22″E
- Country: France
- Region: Bourgogne-Franche-Comté
- Department: Jura
- Arrondissement: Dole
- Canton: Mont-sous-Vaudrey

Government
  - Mayor (2020–2026): Virginie Pate
- Area^{1}: 17.87 km^{2} (6.90 sq mi)
- Highest elevation: 259 m (850 ft)
- Lowest elevation: 212 m (696 ft)
- Population (2023): 355
  - Density: 19.9/km^{2} (51.5/sq mi)
- Time zone: UTC+01:00 (CET)
  - Summer (DST): UTC+02:00 (CEST)
- INSEE/Postal code: 39546 /39380
- ^{1} French Land Register data, which excludes lakes, ponds, glaciers > 1 km^{2} (0.386 sq mi or 247 acres) and river estuaries.

Vaudrey (French pronunciation: [vodʁɛ]) is a commune in the Jura department in the Bourgogne-Franche-Comté region in eastern France.

== Population ==
Historical population
Year	Pop.	±% p.a.
1968	306	—
1975	330	+1.08%
1982	282	−2.22%
1990	289	+0.31%
1999	319	+1.10%
2007	367	+1.77%
2012	391	+1.27%
2017	373	−0.94%
2023	355	−0.82%
Source: INSEE

== See also ==
- Communes of the Jura department
