= Écleux =

Commune in Bourgogne-Franche-Comté, France

- Commune
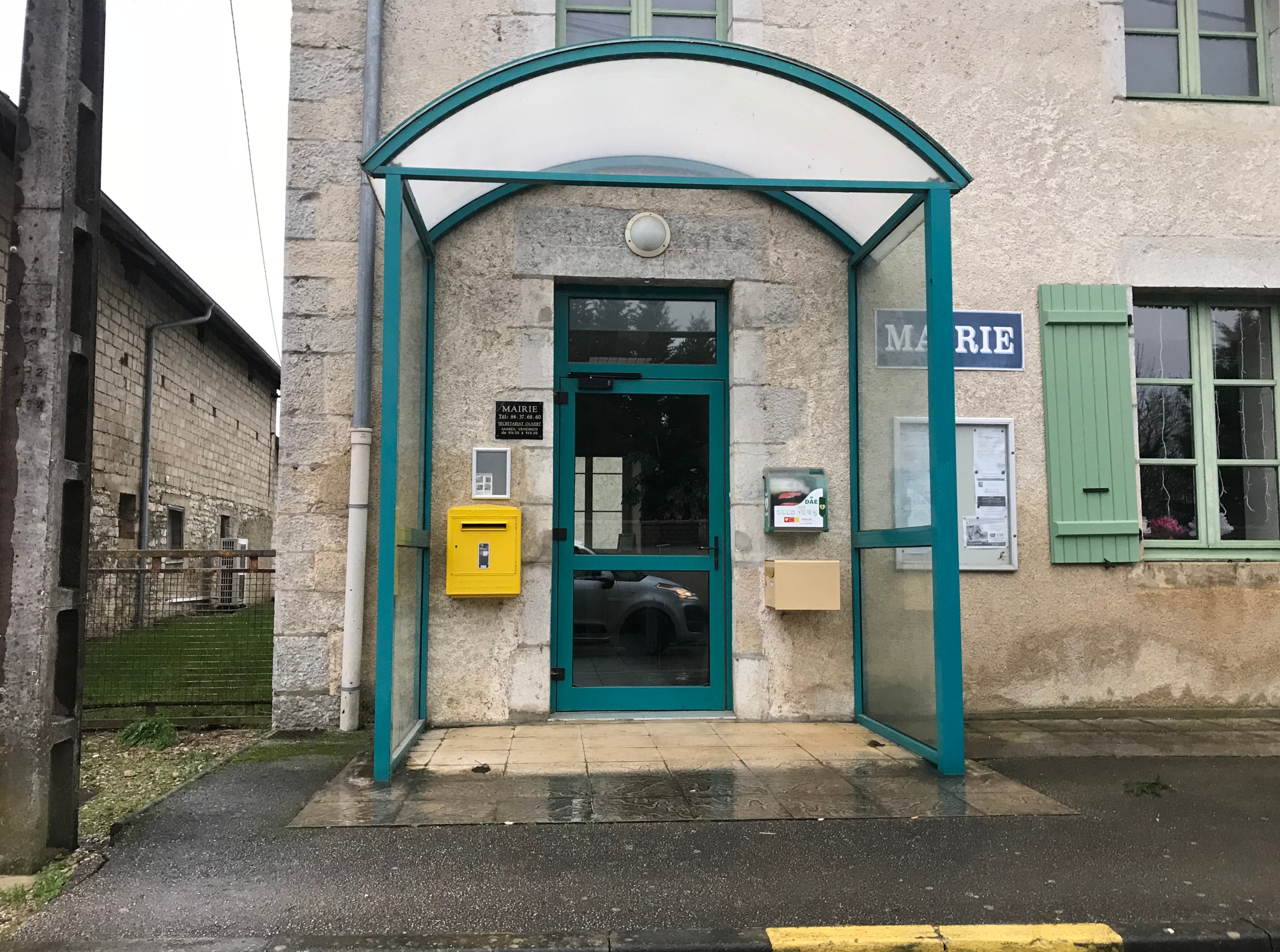
- The town hall in Écleux
- Location of Écleux
- Location within France Location within Bourgogne-Franche-Comté
- Coordinates: 46°59′59″N 5°44′18″E
- Country: France
- Region: Bourgogne-Franche-Comté
- Department: Jura
- Arrondissement: Dole
- Canton: Mont-sous-Vaudrey

Government
  - Mayor (2020–2026): Étienne Rougeaux
- Area^{1}: 6.20 km^{2} (2.39 sq mi)
- Highest elevation: 277 m (909 ft)
- Lowest elevation: 223 m (732 ft)
- Population (2023): 215
  - Density: 34.7/km^{2} (89.8/sq mi)
- Time zone: UTC+01:00 (CET)
  - Summer (DST): UTC+02:00 (CEST)
- INSEE/Postal code: 39206 /39600
- ^{1} French Land Register data, which excludes lakes, ponds, glaciers > 1 km^{2} (0.386 sq mi or 247 acres) and river estuaries.

Écleux (French pronunciation: [eklø]) is a commune in the Jura department in Bourgogne-Franche-Comté in eastern France.

== Population ==
Historical population
Year	Pop.	±% p.a.
1968	146	—
1975	110	−3.96%
1982	119	+1.13%
1990	136	+1.68%
1999	153	+1.32%
2007	183	+2.26%
2012	211	+2.89%
2017	224	+1.20%
2023	215	−0.68%
Source: INSEE

== See also ==
- Communes of the Jura department
