= Fraisans =

Commune in Bourgogne-Franche-Comté, France

- Commune
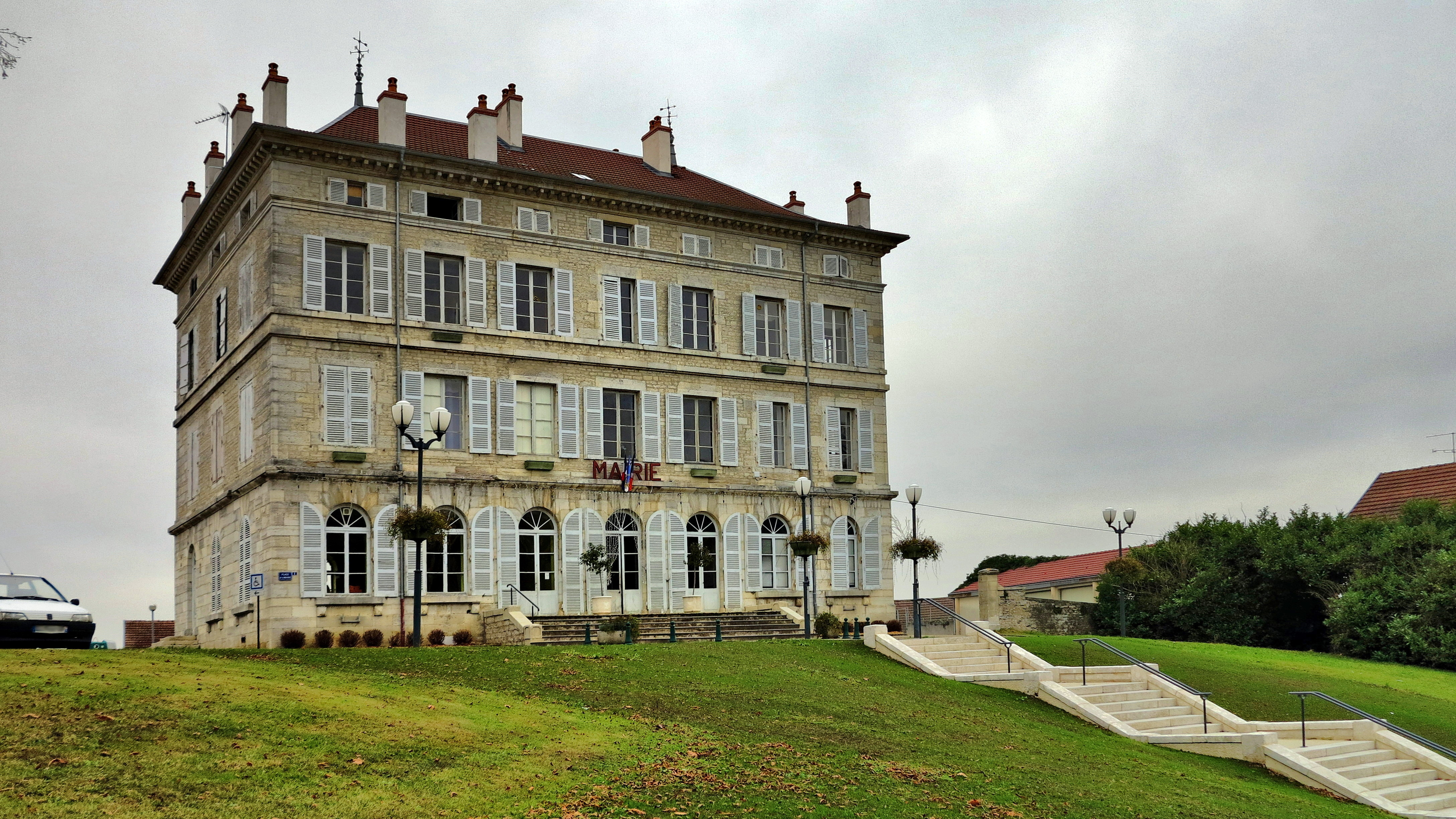
- The town hall in Fraisans

- Coat of arms
- Location of Fraisans
- Location within France Location within Bourgogne-Franche-Comté
- Coordinates: 47°09′00″N 5°45′40″E
- Country: France
- Region: Bourgogne-Franche-Comté
- Department: Jura
- Arrondissement: Dole
- Canton: Mont-sous-Vaudrey

Government
  - Mayor (2020–2026): Hubert Bacot
- Area^{1}: 16.90 km^{2} (6.53 sq mi)
- Highest elevation: 279 m (915 ft)
- Lowest elevation: 209 m (686 ft)
- Population (2023): 1,160
  - Density: 68.6/km^{2} (178/sq mi)
- Time zone: UTC+01:00 (CET)
  - Summer (DST): UTC+02:00 (CEST)
- INSEE/Postal code: 39235 /39700
- ^{1} French Land Register data, which excludes lakes, ponds, glaciers > 1 km^{2} (0.386 sq mi or 247 acres) and river estuaries.

Fraisans (French pronunciation: [fʁɛzɑ̃]) is a commune in the Jura department in Bourgogne-Franche-Comté in eastern France.

== Population ==
Historical population
Year	Pop.	±% p.a.
1968	1,026	—
1975	1,078	+0.71%
1982	1,108	+0.39%
1990	1,089	−0.22%
1999	1,240	+1.45%
2007	1,220	−0.20%
2012	1,237	+0.28%
2017	1,215	−0.36%
2023	1,160	−0.77%
Source: INSEE

== See also ==
- Communes of the Jura department
