= Our, Jura =

Commune in Bourgogne-Franche-Comté, France

Our
- Commune
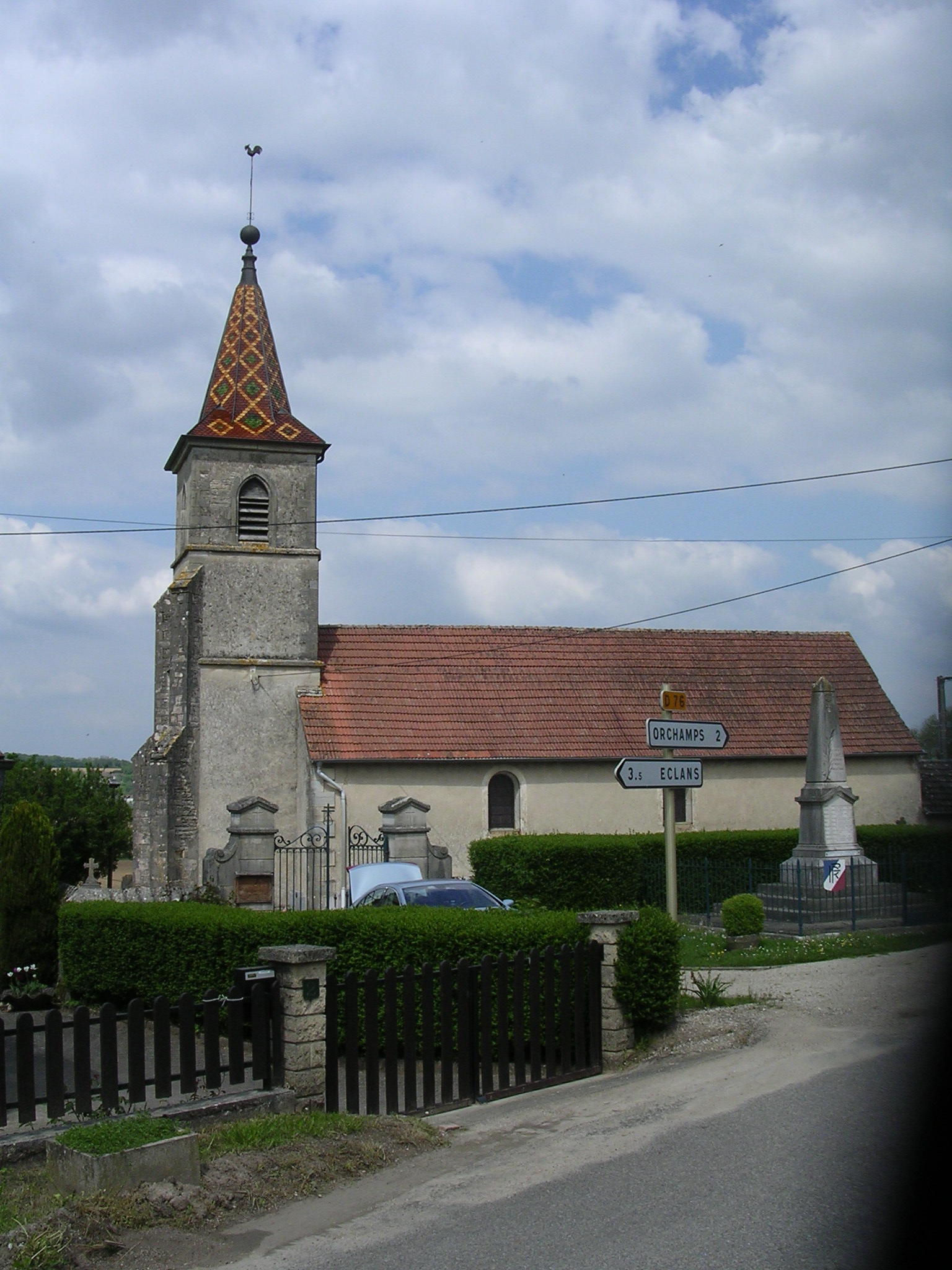
- The church in Our

- Coat of arms
- Location of Our
- Location within France Location within Bourgogne-Franche-Comté
- Coordinates: 47°07′53″N 5°39′05″E
- Country: France
- Region: Bourgogne-Franche-Comté
- Department: Jura
- Arrondissement: Dole
- Canton: Mont-sous-Vaudrey

Government
  - Mayor (2020–2026): Ségundo Alfonso
- Area^{1}: 13.86 km^{2} (5.35 sq mi)
- Highest elevation: 261 m (856 ft)
- Lowest elevation: 207 m (679 ft)
- Population (2023): 147
  - Density: 10.6/km^{2} (27.5/sq mi)
- Time zone: UTC+01:00 (CET)
  - Summer (DST): UTC+02:00 (CEST)
- INSEE/Postal code: 39400 /39700
- ^{1} French Land Register data, which excludes lakes, ponds, glaciers > 1 km^{2} (0.386 sq mi or 247 acres) and river estuaries.

Our (French pronunciation: [uʁ]) is a commune in the Jura department in Bourgogne-Franche-Comté in eastern France.

== Population ==
Historical population
Year	Pop.	±% p.a.
1968	104	—
1975	102	−0.28%
1982	118	+2.10%
1990	140	+2.16%
1999	169	+2.11%
2007	160	−0.68%
2012	149	−1.41%
2017	140	−1.24%
2023	147	+0.82%
Source: INSEE

== See also ==
- Communes of the Jura department
