= Germigney, Jura =

Commune in Bourgogne-Franche-Comté, France

Germigney
- Commune
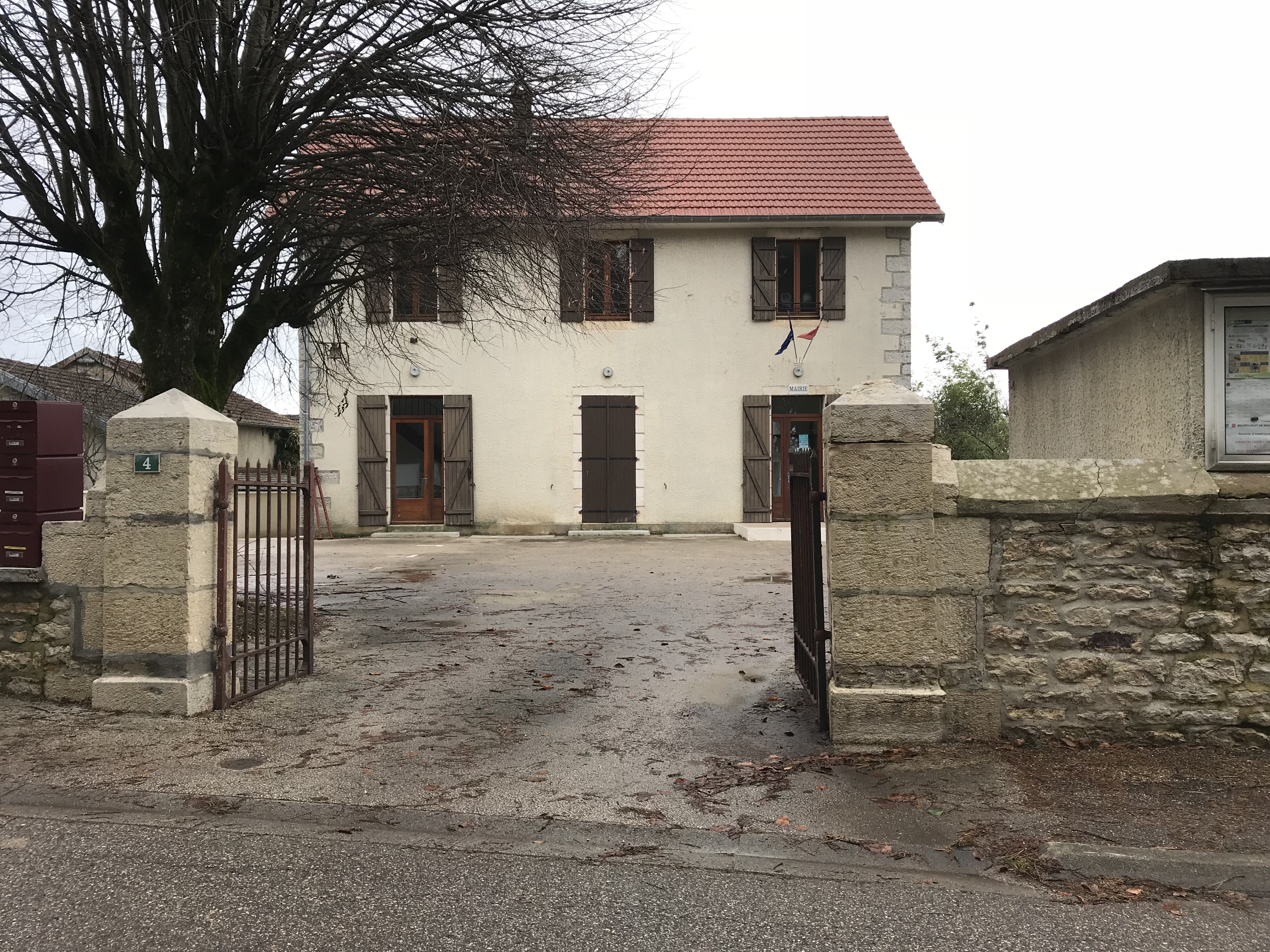
- The town hall in Germigney

- Coat of arms
- Location of Germigney
- Location within France Location within Bourgogne-Franche-Comté
- Coordinates: 47°01′39″N 5°41′20″E
- Country: France
- Region: Bourgogne-Franche-Comté
- Department: Jura
- Arrondissement: Dole
- Canton: Mont-sous-Vaudrey

Government
  - Mayor (2020–2026): Stéphane Ramaux
- Area^{1}: 5.44 km^{2} (2.10 sq mi)
- Highest elevation: 254 m (833 ft)
- Lowest elevation: 220 m (720 ft)
- Population (2023): 79
  - Density: 15/km^{2} (38/sq mi)
- Time zone: UTC+01:00 (CET)
  - Summer (DST): UTC+02:00 (CEST)
- INSEE/Postal code: 39249 /39380
- ^{1} French Land Register data, which excludes lakes, ponds, glaciers > 1 km^{2} (0.386 sq mi or 247 acres) and river estuaries.

Germigney (French pronunciation: [ʒɛʁmiɲɛ]) is a commune in the Jura department in Bourgogne-Franche-Comté in eastern France.

== Population ==
Historical population
Year	Pop.	±% p.a.
1968	84	—
1975	73	−1.99%
1982	87	+2.54%
1990	79	−1.20%
1999	77	−0.28%
2007	83	+0.94%
2012	86	+0.71%
2017	78	−1.93%
2023	79	+0.21%
Source: INSEE

== See also ==
- Communes of the Jura department
