= La Loye =

Commune in Bourgogne-Franche-Comté, France

- Commune
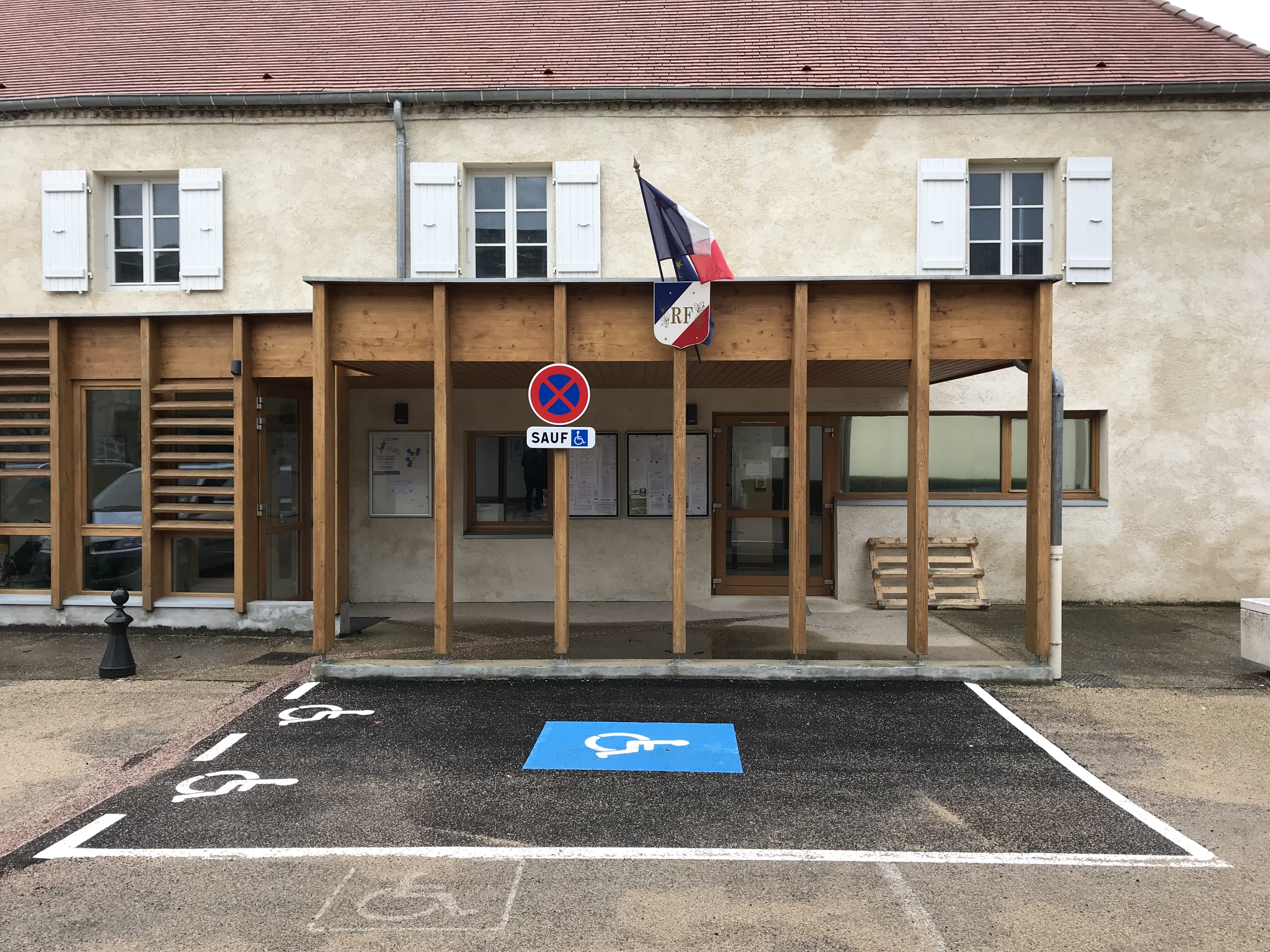
- The town hall in La Loye
- Location of La Loye
- Location within France Location within Bourgogne-Franche-Comté
- Coordinates: 47°01′40″N 5°33′24″E
- Country: France
- Region: Bourgogne-Franche-Comté
- Department: Jura
- Arrondissement: Dole
- Canton: Mont-sous-Vaudrey

Government
  - Mayor (2020–2026): Virginie Valot
- Area^{1}: 19.56 km^{2} (7.55 sq mi)
- Highest elevation: 247 m (810 ft)
- Lowest elevation: 200 m (660 ft)
- Population (2023): 518
  - Density: 26.5/km^{2} (68.6/sq mi)
- Time zone: UTC+01:00 (CET)
  - Summer (DST): UTC+02:00 (CEST)
- INSEE/Postal code: 39305 /39380
- ^{1} French Land Register data, which excludes lakes, ponds, glaciers > 1 km^{2} (0.386 sq mi or 247 acres) and river estuaries.

La Loye (French pronunciation: [la lwa]) is a commune in the Jura department in Bourgogne-Franche-Comté in eastern France.

== See also ==
- Communes of the Jura department
