= La Bretenière, Jura =

Commune in Bourgogne-Franche-Comté, France

La Bretenière
- Commune
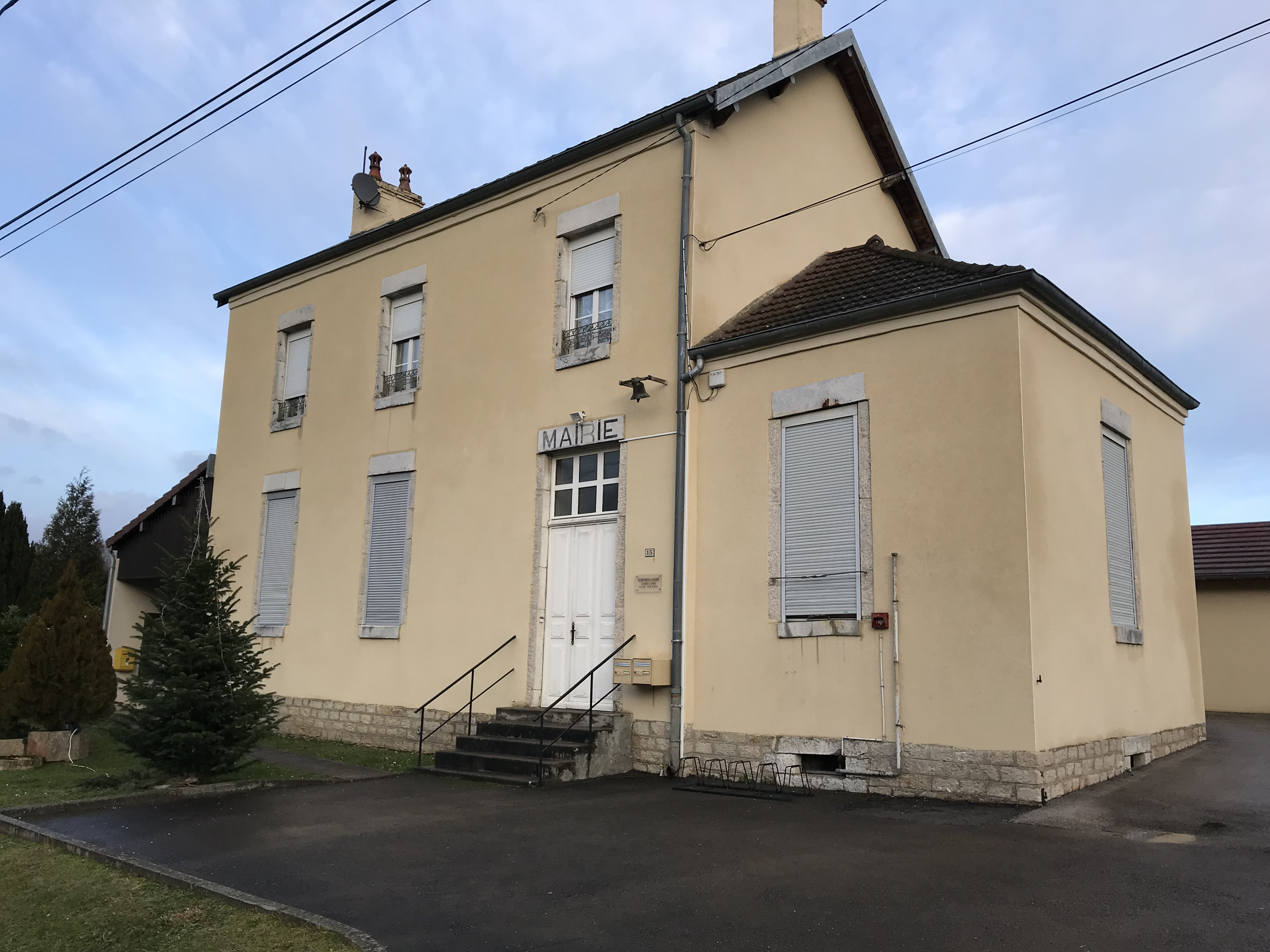
- The town hall in La Bretenière

- Coat of arms
- Location of La Bretenière
- Location within France Location within Bourgogne-Franche-Comté
- Coordinates: 47°07′47″N 5°39′39″E
- Country: France
- Region: Bourgogne-Franche-Comté
- Department: Jura
- Arrondissement: Dole
- Canton: Mont-sous-Vaudrey

Government
  - Mayor (2020–2026): Isabelle Guillot
- Area^{1}: 1.63 km^{2} (0.63 sq mi)
- Highest elevation: 257 m (843 ft)
- Lowest elevation: 208 m (682 ft)
- Population (2023): 211
  - Density: 129/km^{2} (335/sq mi)
- Time zone: UTC+01:00 (CET)
  - Summer (DST): UTC+02:00 (CEST)
- INSEE/Postal code: 39076 /39700
- ^{1} French Land Register data, which excludes lakes, ponds, glaciers > 1 km^{2} (0.386 sq mi or 247 acres) and river estuaries.

La Bretenière (French pronunciation: [la bʁətnjɛʁ]) is a commune in the Jura department in Bourgogne-Franche-Comté in eastern France.

== Population ==
Historical population
Year	Pop.	±% p.a.
1968	115	—
1975	99	−2.12%
1982	126	+3.51%
1990	137	+1.05%
1999	165	+2.09%
2007	189	+1.71%
2012	214	+2.52%
2017	220	+0.55%
2023	211	−0.69%
Source: INSEE

== See also ==
- Communes of the Jura department
