= Salans, Jura =

Commune in Bourgogne-Franche-Comté, France

Salans
- Commune
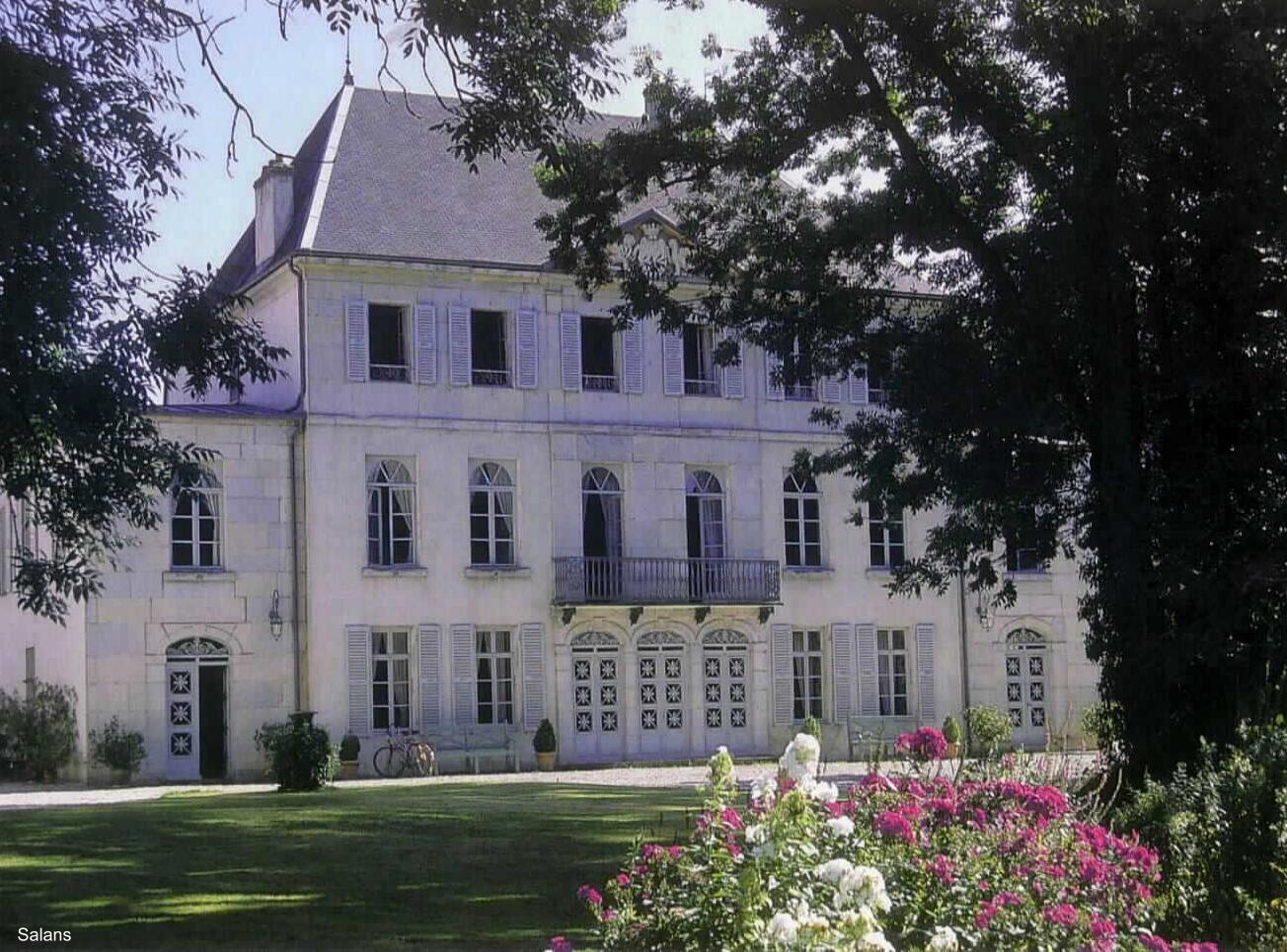
- Chateau

- Coat of arms
- Location of Salans
- Location within France Location within Bourgogne-Franche-Comté
- Coordinates: 47°09′56″N 5°47′34″E
- Country: France
- Region: Bourgogne-Franche-Comté
- Department: Jura
- Arrondissement: Dole
- Canton: Mont-sous-Vaudrey

Government
  - Mayor (2020–2026): Philippe Smagghe
- Area^{1}: 6.88 km^{2} (2.66 sq mi)
- Highest elevation: 276 m (906 ft)
- Lowest elevation: 211 m (692 ft)
- Population (2023): 658
  - Density: 95.6/km^{2} (248/sq mi)
- Time zone: UTC+01:00 (CET)
  - Summer (DST): UTC+02:00 (CEST)
- INSEE/Postal code: 39498 /39700
- ^{1} French Land Register data, which excludes lakes, ponds, glaciers > 1 km^{2} (0.386 sq mi or 247 acres) and river estuaries.

Salans (French pronunciation: [salɑ̃]) is a commune in the Jura department in the Bourgogne-Franche-Comté region in eastern France.

== Population ==
Historical population
Year	Pop.	±% p.a.
1968	231	—
1975	250	+1.14%
1982	314	+3.31%
1990	422	+3.76%
1999	464	+1.06%
2007	569	+2.58%
2012	568	−0.04%
2017	591	+0.80%
2023	658	+1.81%
Source: INSEE

== See also ==
- Communes of the Jura department
