= Beauvoisin =

Beauvoisin is the name or part of the name of several communes in France:

- Beauvoisin, in the Drôme department
- Beauvoisin, in the Gard department
- Beauvoisin, former commune of the Jura department, now part of Asnans-Beauvoisin
