= Balaiseaux =

Commune in Bourgogne-Franche-Comté, France

- Commune
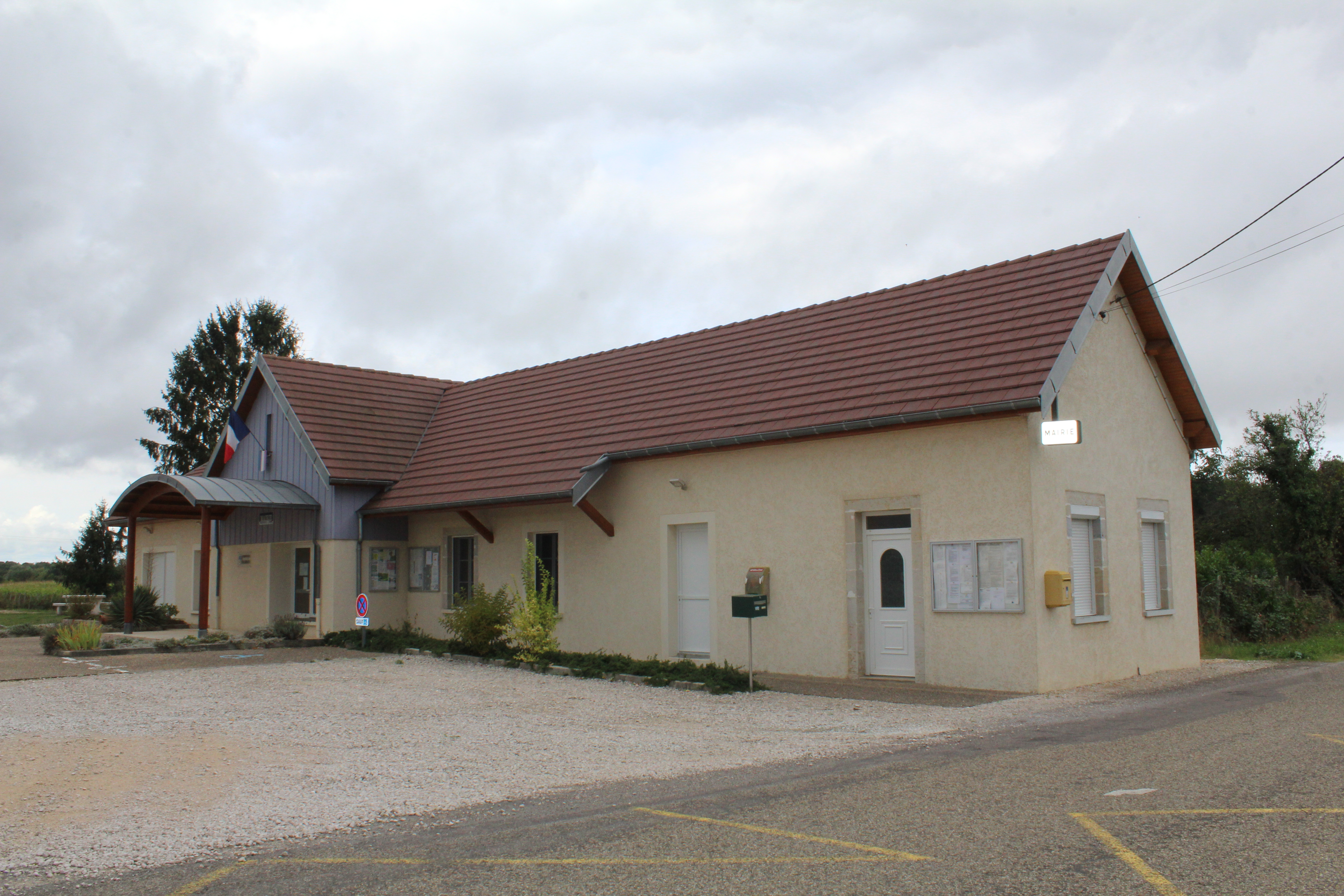
- The town hall in Balaiseaux
- Location of Balaiseaux
- Location within France Location within Bourgogne-Franche-Comté
- Coordinates: 46°57′49″N 5°28′02″E
- Country: France
- Region: Bourgogne-Franche-Comté
- Department: Jura
- Arrondissement: Dole
- Canton: Tavaux

Government
  - Mayor (2020–2026): Gérard Michaud
- Area^{1}: 6.01 km^{2} (2.32 sq mi)
- Highest elevation: 222 m (728 ft)
- Lowest elevation: 196 m (643 ft)
- Population (2023): 291
  - Density: 48.4/km^{2} (125/sq mi)
- Time zone: UTC+01:00 (CET)
  - Summer (DST): UTC+02:00 (CEST)
- INSEE/Postal code: 39034 /39120
- ^{1} French Land Register data, which excludes lakes, ponds, glaciers > 1 km^{2} (0.386 sq mi or 247 acres) and river estuaries.

Balaiseaux (French pronunciation: [balɛzo]) is a commune in the Jura department in the region of Bourgogne-Franche-Comté in eastern France.

== Population ==
Historical population
Year	Pop.	±% p.a.
1968	180	—
1975	135	−4.03%
1982	179	+4.11%
1990	211	+2.08%
1999	188	−1.27%
2007	248	+3.52%
2012	279	+2.38%
2017	309	+2.06%
2023	291	−1.00%
Source: INSEE

== See also ==
- Communes of the Jura department
