= Tavaux =

- Commune
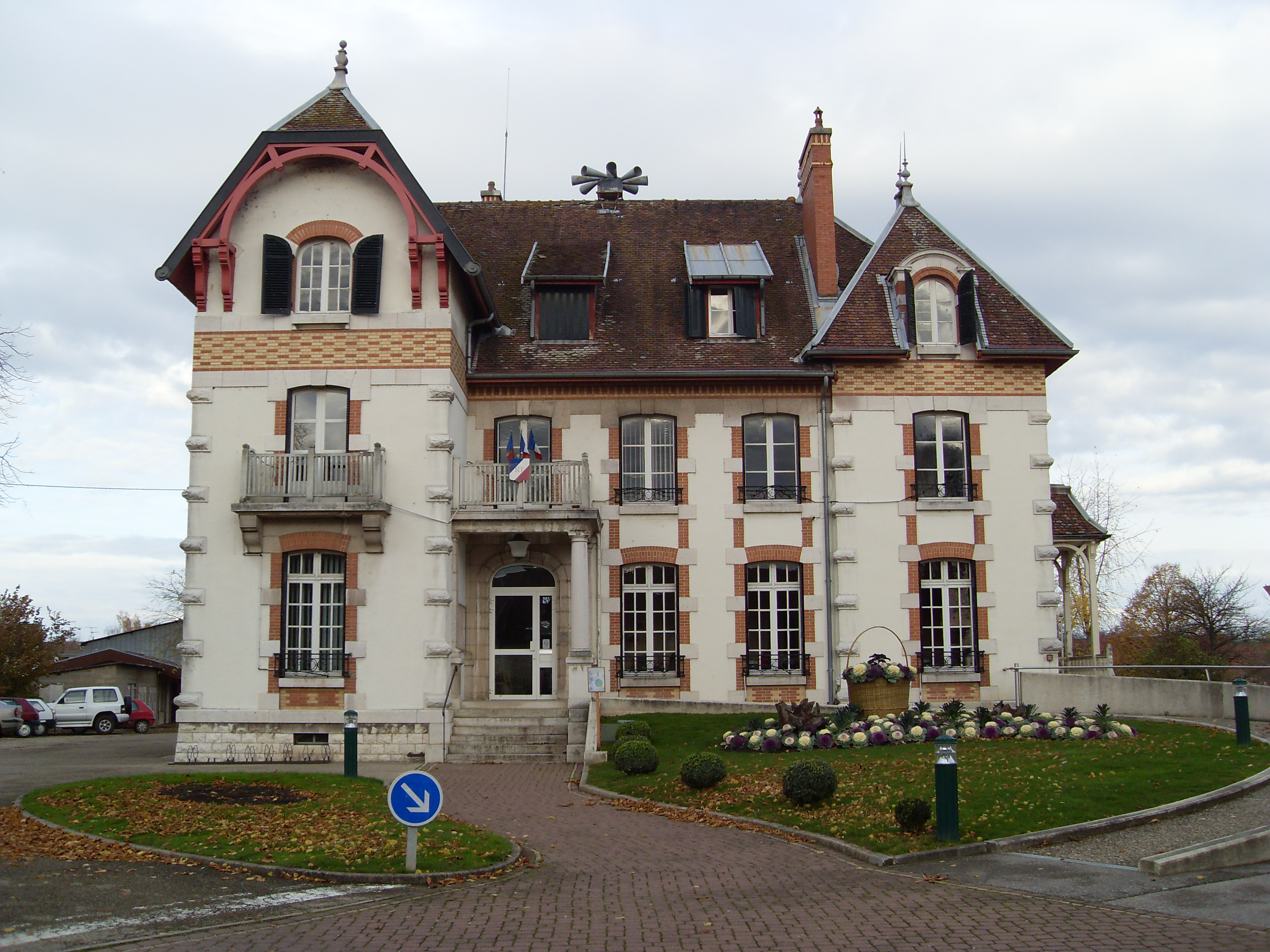
- Town hall

- Coat of arms
- Location of Tavaux
- Location within France Location within Bourgogne-Franche-Comté
- Coordinates: 47°02′39″N 5°24′46″E
- Country: France
- Region: Bourgogne-Franche-Comté
- Department: Jura
- Arrondissement: Dole
- Canton: Tavaux
- Intercommunality: CA Grand Dole

Government
  - Mayor (2020–2026): Jean-Michel Daubigney
- Area^{1}: 13.86 km^{2} (5.35 sq mi)
- Highest elevation: 197 m (646 ft)
- Lowest elevation: 189 m (620 ft)
- Population (2023): 3,888
  - Density: 280.5/km^{2} (726.5/sq mi)
- Time zone: UTC+01:00 (CET)
  - Summer (DST): UTC+02:00 (CEST)
- INSEE/Postal code: 39526 /39500
- ^{1} French Land Register data, which excludes lakes, ponds, glaciers > 1 km^{2} (0.386 sq mi or 247 acres) and river estuaries.

Tavaux (French pronunciation: [tavo]) is a commune in the Jura department in the Bourgogne-Franche-Comté region in eastern France. Dole – Jura Airport is located here.

== Population ==
Historical population

Year	Pop.	±% p.a.
1793	968	—
1800	934	−0.51%
1806	1,072	+2.32%
1821	1,213	+0.83%
1831	1,388	+1.36%
1836	1,315	−1.07%
1841	1,415	+1.48%
1846	1,505	+1.24%
1851	1,571	+0.86%
1856	1,363	−2.80%
1861	1,317	−0.68%
1866	1,367	+0.75%
1872	1,355	−0.15%
1876	1,438	+1.50%
1881	1,496	+0.79%
1886	1,299	−2.78%
1891	1,284	−0.23%
1896	1,155	−2.10%
1901	1,121	−0.60%

Year	Pop.	±% p.a.
1906	1,063	−1.06%
1911	1,100	+0.69%
1921	929	−1.68%
1926	925	−0.09%
1931	2,512	+22.12%
1936	2,311	−1.65%
1946	2,728	+1.67%
1954	3,365	+2.66%
1962	4,369	+3.32%
1968	4,905	+1.95%
1975	4,736	−0.50%
1982	4,417	−0.99%
1990	4,387	−0.09%
1999	4,274	−0.29%
2007	4,056	−0.65%
2012	4,067	+0.05%
2017	3,918	−0.74%
2023	3,888	−0.13%

Source: EHESS and INSEE (1968-2023)

== Climate ==
Climate data for Tavaux (1995–2020 averages)
Month	Jan	Feb	Mar	Apr	May	Jun	Jul	Aug	Sep	Oct	Nov	Dec	Year
Record high °C (°F)	17.5 (63.5)	20.9 (69.6)	24.8 (76.6)	28.7 (83.7)	31.8 (89.2)	37.5 (99.5)	39.0 (102.2)	40.1 (104.2)	33.9 (93.0)	29.0 (84.2)	21.4 (70.5)	17.2 (63.0)	40.1 (104.2)
Mean daily maximum °C (°F)	6.0 (42.8)	8.0 (46.4)	12.9 (55.2)	17.0 (62.6)	20.6 (69.1)	24.9 (76.8)	26.9 (80.4)	26.4 (79.5)	22.1 (71.8)	17.0 (62.6)	10.2 (50.4)	6.5 (43.7)	16.5 (61.7)
Daily mean °C (°F)	3.0 (37.4)	4.1 (39.4)	7.7 (45.9)	11.2 (52.2)	14.9 (58.8)	18.8 (65.8)	20.6 (69.1)	20.3 (68.5)	16.5 (61.7)	12.5 (54.5)	6.9 (44.4)	3.7 (38.7)	11.7 (53.1)
Mean daily minimum °C (°F)	0.1 (32.2)	0.2 (32.4)	2.6 (36.7)	5.3 (41.5)	9.3 (48.7)	12.8 (55.0)	14.4 (57.9)	14.2 (57.6)	10.9 (51.6)	8.0 (46.4)	3.6 (38.5)	0.9 (33.6)	6.9 (44.4)
Record low °C (°F)	−14.9 (5.2)	−12.7 (9.1)	−13.2 (8.2)	−5.2 (22.6)	−1.0 (30.2)	2.9 (37.2)	5.7 (42.3)	5.4 (41.7)	0.8 (33.4)	−6.4 (20.5)	−9.5 (14.9)	−18.2 (−0.8)	−18.2 (−0.8)
Average precipitation mm (inches)	59.3 (2.33)	54.5 (2.15)	58.9 (2.32)	66.2 (2.61)	90.3 (3.56)	72.9 (2.87)	71.4 (2.81)	79.5 (3.13)	69.9 (2.75)	86.6 (3.41)	90.1 (3.55)	69.1 (2.72)	868.7 (34.20)
Average precipitation days (≥ 1.0 mm)	11.1	9.5	9.7	9.0	11.2	8.6	9.0	9.1	8.1	10.5	10.9	12.0	118.7
Mean monthly sunshine hours	57.3	99.6	186.0	215.0	220.6	252.2	275.7	251.1	204.9	128.4	67.4	53.6	2,011.7
Source: Meteociel

== See also ==
- Communes of the Jura department
