= Chêne-Bernard =

Commune in Bourgogne-Franche-Comté, France

- Commune
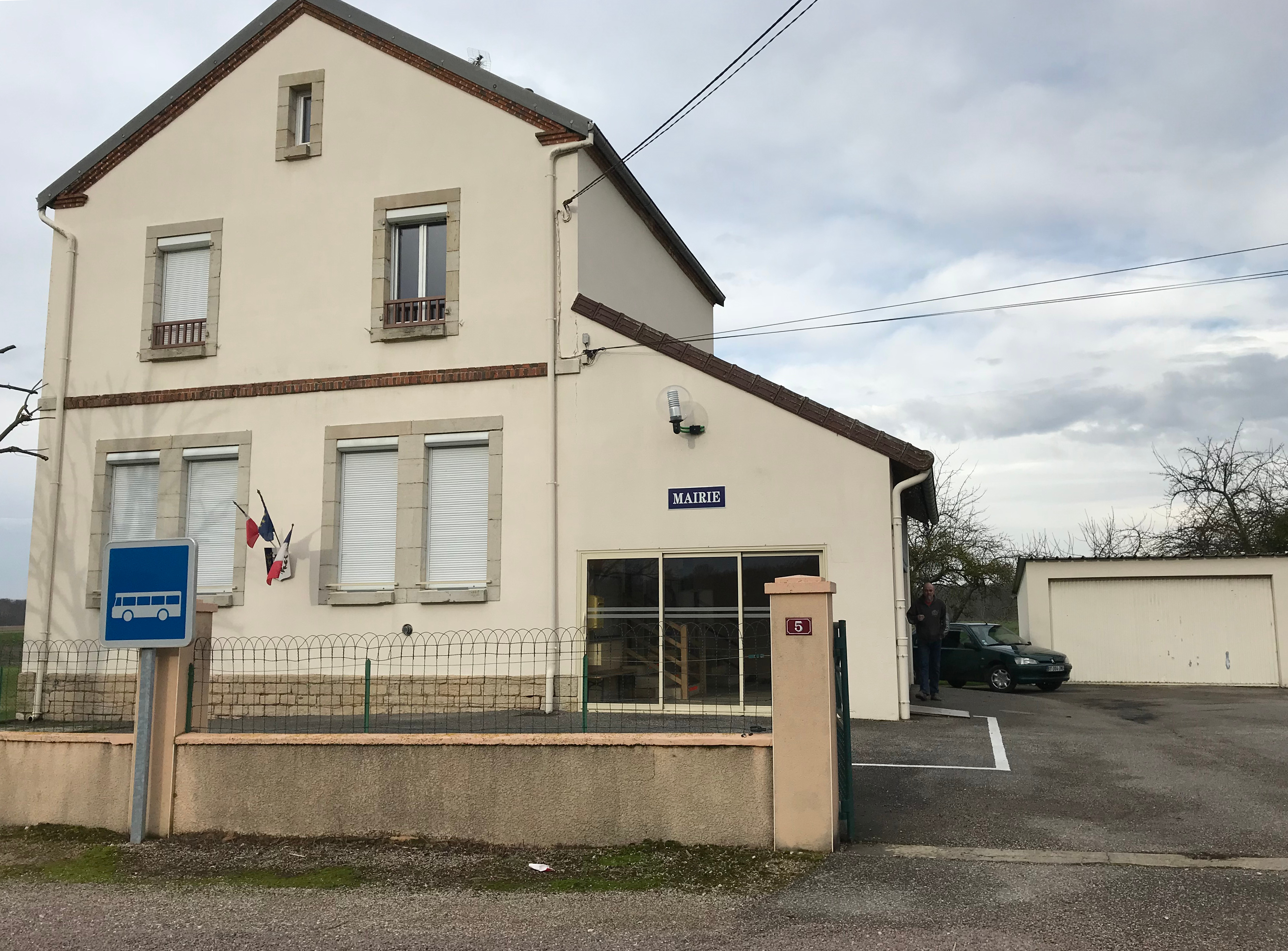
- The town hall in Chêne-Bernard
- Location of Chêne-Bernard
- Location within France Location within Bourgogne-Franche-Comté
- Coordinates: 46°55′16″N 5°29′01″E
- Country: France
- Region: Bourgogne-Franche-Comté
- Department: Jura
- Arrondissement: Dole
- Canton: Tavaux

Government
  - Mayor (2020–2026): Denise Chaney
- Area^{1}: 3.61 km^{2} (1.39 sq mi)
- Highest elevation: 223 m (732 ft)
- Lowest elevation: 197 m (646 ft)
- Population (2023): 80
  - Density: 22/km^{2} (57/sq mi)
- Time zone: UTC+01:00 (CET)
  - Summer (DST): UTC+02:00 (CEST)
- INSEE/Postal code: 39139 /39120
- ^{1} French Land Register data, which excludes lakes, ponds, glaciers > 1 km^{2} (0.386 sq mi or 247 acres) and river estuaries.

Chêne-Bernard (French pronunciation: [ʃɛn bɛʁnaʁ]) is a commune in the Jura department in Bourgogne-Franche-Comté in eastern France.

== Population ==
Historical population
Year	Pop.	±% p.a.
1968	58	—
1975	54	−1.02%
1982	78	+5.39%
1990	68	−1.70%
1999	62	−1.02%
2007	72	+1.89%
2012	73	+0.28%
2017	64	−2.60%
2023	80	+3.79%
Source: INSEE

== See also ==
- Communes of the Jura department
