= Molay, Jura =

Commune in Bourgogne-Franche-Comté, France

Molay
- Commune
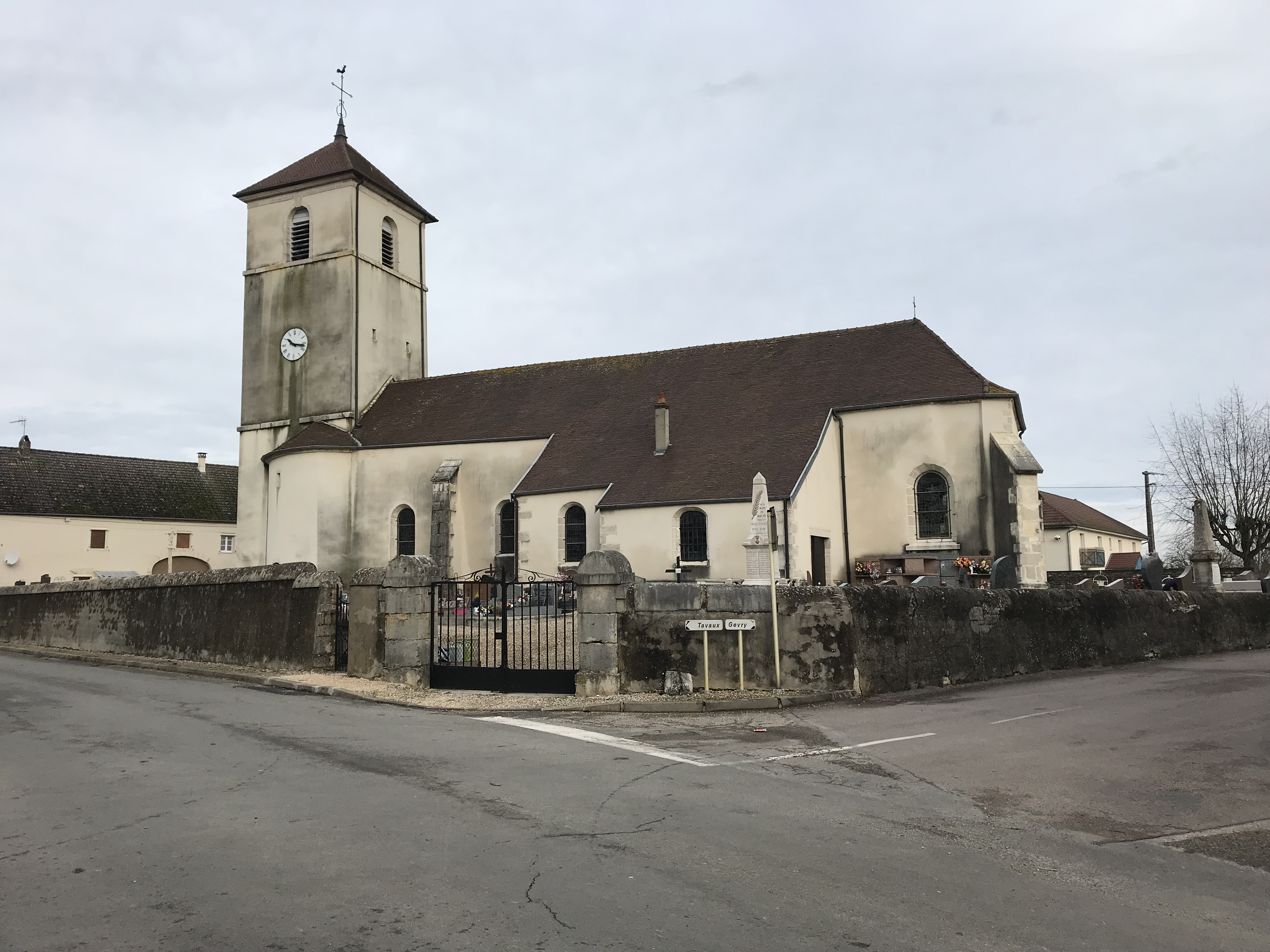
- The church in Molay
- Location of Molay
- Location within France Location within Bourgogne-Franche-Comté
- Coordinates: 47°01′15″N 5°25′16″E
- Country: France
- Region: Bourgogne-Franche-Comté
- Department: Jura
- Arrondissement: Dole
- Canton: Tavaux

Government
  - Mayor (2020–2026): Gilbert Bongain
- Area^{1}: 6.38 km^{2} (2.46 sq mi)
- Highest elevation: 196 m (643 ft)
- Lowest elevation: 190 m (620 ft)
- Population (2023): 505
  - Density: 79.2/km^{2} (205/sq mi)
- Time zone: UTC+01:00 (CET)
  - Summer (DST): UTC+02:00 (CEST)
- INSEE/Postal code: 39338 /39500
- ^{1} French Land Register data, which excludes lakes, ponds, glaciers > 1 km^{2} (0.386 sq mi or 247 acres) and river estuaries.

Molay (French pronunciation: [mɔlɛ]) is a commune in the Jura department in Bourgogne-Franche-Comté in eastern France.

== See also ==
- Communes of the Jura department
