= Longwy-sur-le-Doubs =

Commune in Bourgogne-Franche-Comté, France

- Commune
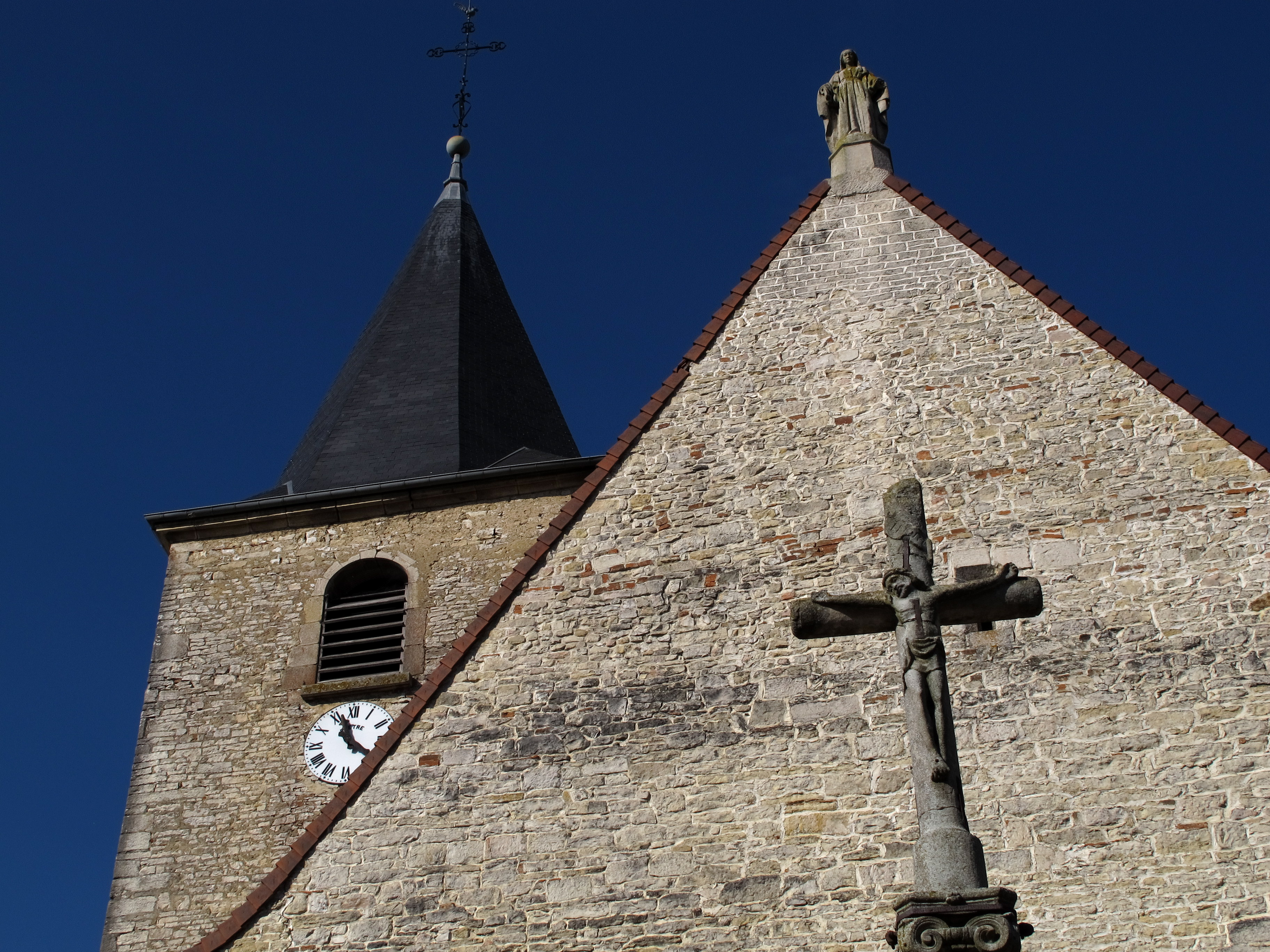
- The church in Longwy-sur-le-Doubs

- Coat of arms
- Location of Longwy-sur-le-Doubs
- Location within France Location within Bourgogne-Franche-Comté
- Coordinates: 46°57′32″N 5°22′24″E
- Country: France
- Region: Bourgogne-Franche-Comté
- Department: Jura
- Arrondissement: Dole
- Canton: Tavaux

Government
  - Mayor (2020–2026): Pierre Thiébaut
- Area^{1}: 16.46 km^{2} (6.36 sq mi)
- Highest elevation: 189 m (620 ft)
- Lowest elevation: 182 m (597 ft)
- Population (2023): 496
  - Density: 30.1/km^{2} (78.0/sq mi)
- Time zone: UTC+01:00 (CET)
  - Summer (DST): UTC+02:00 (CEST)
- INSEE/Postal code: 39299 /39120
- ^{1} French Land Register data, which excludes lakes, ponds, glaciers > 1 km^{2} (0.386 sq mi or 247 acres) and river estuaries.

Longwy-sur-le-Doubs (French pronunciation: [lɔ̃vi syʁ lə du], literally Longwy on the Doubs) is a commune in the Jura department in Bourgogne-Franche-Comté in eastern France.

== Population ==
Historical population
| Year | Pop. | ±% p.a. |
|---|---|---|
| 1968 | 525 | — |
| 1975 | 491 | −0.95% |
| 1982 | 490 | −0.03% |
| 1990 | 498 | +0.20% |
| 1999 | 496 | −0.04% |
| 2007 | 557 | +1.46% |
| 2012 | 525 | −1.18% |
| 2017 | 505 | −0.77% |
| 2023 | 496 | −0.30% |
Source: INSEE

== See also ==
- Communes of the Jura department
