= Chemin, Jura =

Commune in Bourgogne-Franche-Comté, France

Chemin
- Commune
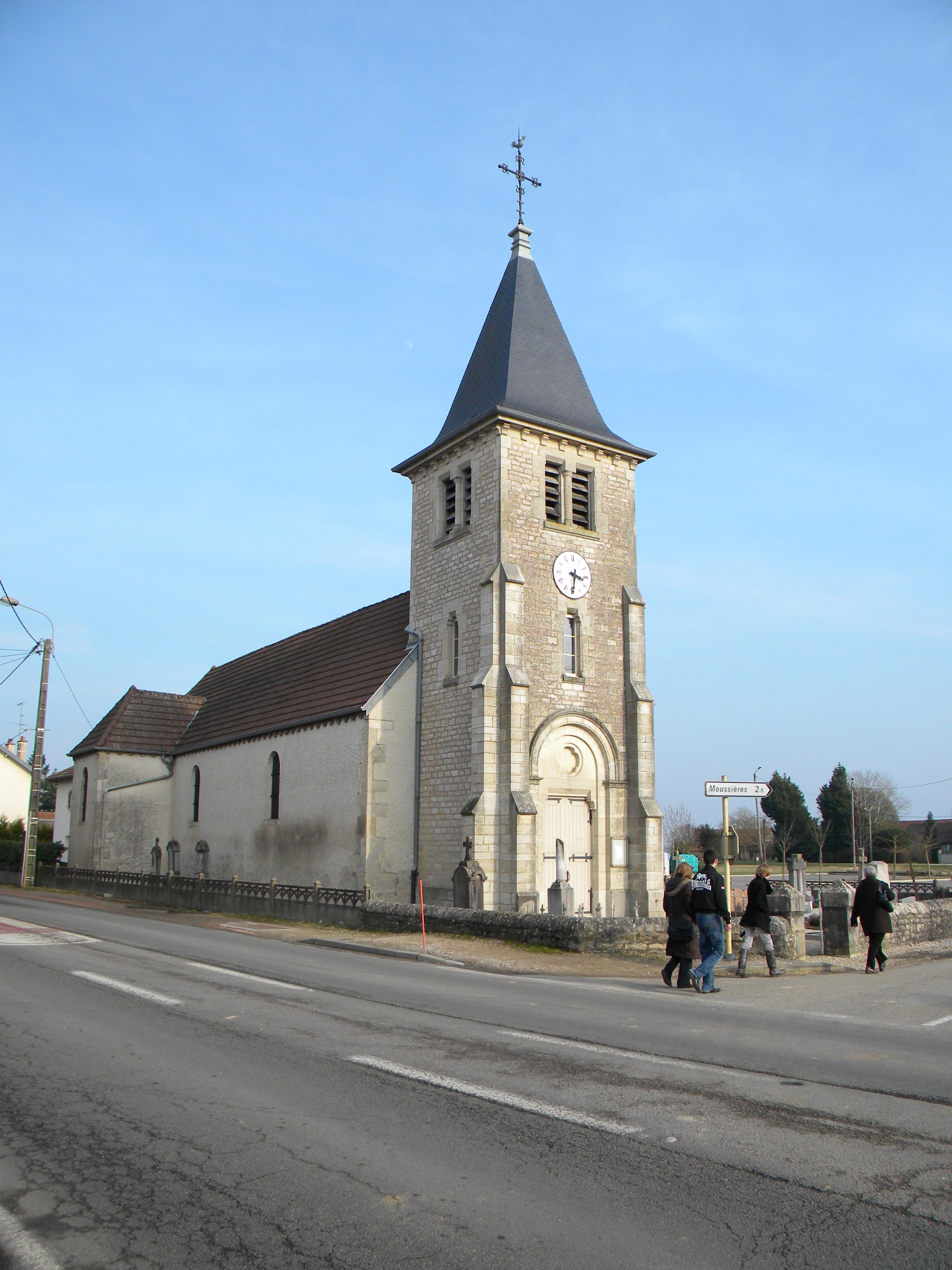
- The church in Chemin

- Coat of arms
- Location of Chemin
- Location within France Location within Bourgogne-Franche-Comté
- Coordinates: 46°58′52″N 5°19′01″E
- Country: France
- Region: Bourgogne-Franche-Comté
- Department: Jura
- Arrondissement: Dole
- Canton: Tavaux

Government
  - Mayor (2020–2026): Annie Jobelin
- Area^{1}: 9.14 km^{2} (3.53 sq mi)
- Highest elevation: 188 m (617 ft)
- Lowest elevation: 182 m (597 ft)
- Population (2023): 312
  - Density: 34.1/km^{2} (88.4/sq mi)
- Time zone: UTC+01:00 (CET)
  - Summer (DST): UTC+02:00 (CEST)
- INSEE/Postal code: 39138 /39120
- ^{1} French Land Register data, which excludes lakes, ponds, glaciers > 1 km^{2} (0.386 sq mi or 247 acres) and river estuaries.

Chemin (French pronunciation: [ʃəmɛ̃]) is a commune in the Jura department in Bourgogne-Franche-Comté in eastern France.

== Population ==
Historical population
Year	Pop.	±% p.a.
1968	317	—
1975	294	−1.07%
1982	333	+1.80%
1990	383	+1.76%
1999	380	−0.09%
2007	362	−0.60%
2012	342	−1.13%
2017	343	+0.06%
2023	312	−1.57%
Source: INSEE

== See also ==
- Communes of the Jura department
