= Saint-Loup, Jura =

Commune in Bourgogne-Franche-Comté, France

Saint-Loup
- Commune
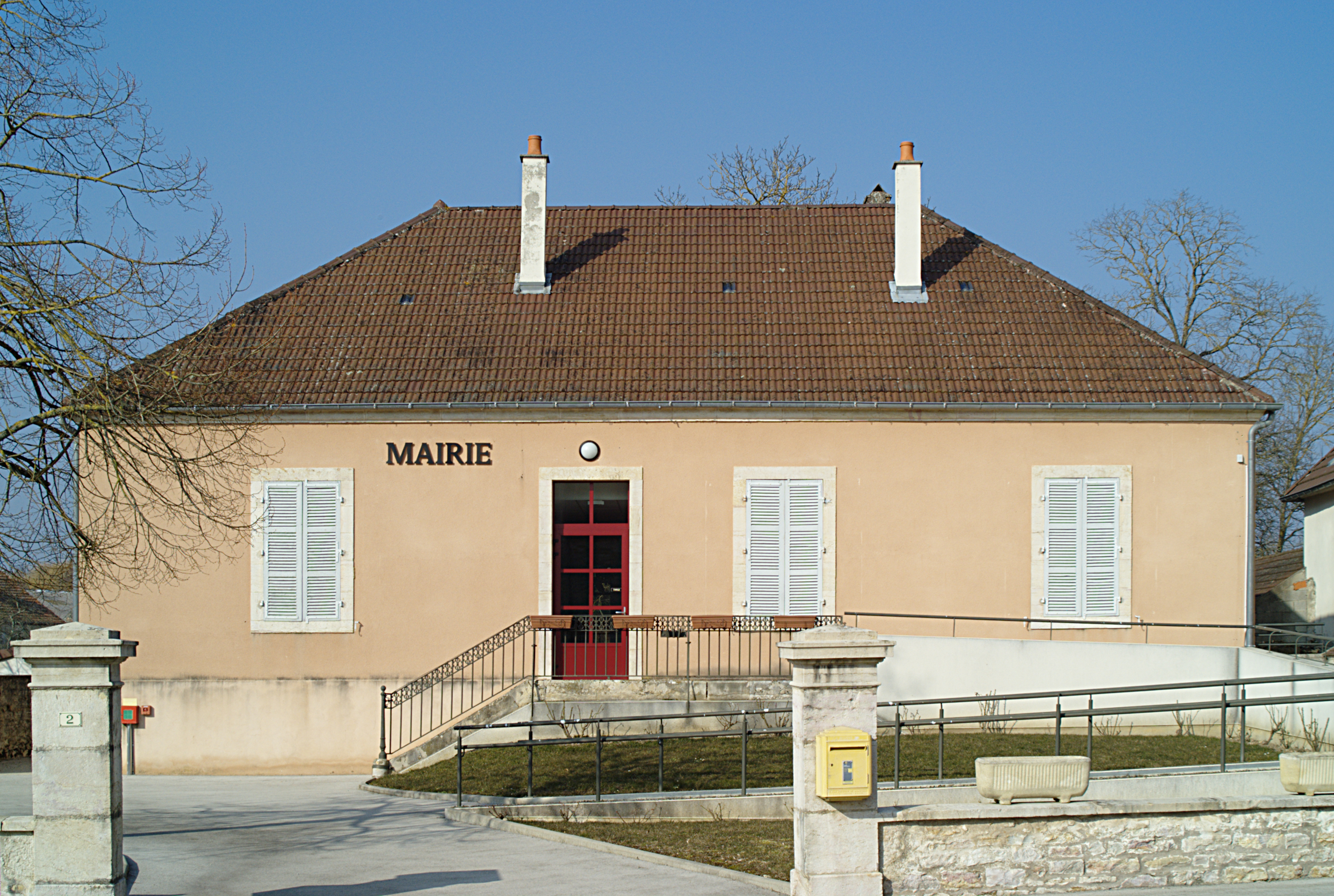
- Town hall
- Location of Saint-Loup
- Location within France Location within Bourgogne-Franche-Comté
- Coordinates: 47°00′20″N 5°18′36″E
- Country: France
- Region: Bourgogne-Franche-Comté
- Department: Jura
- Arrondissement: Dole
- Canton: Tavaux

Government
  - Mayor (2020–2026): Jean-Noël Garnier
- Area^{1}: 9.58 km^{2} (3.70 sq mi)
- Highest elevation: 188 m (617 ft)
- Lowest elevation: 181 m (594 ft)
- Population (2023): 248
  - Density: 25.9/km^{2} (67.0/sq mi)
- Time zone: UTC+01:00 (CET)
  - Summer (DST): UTC+02:00 (CEST)
- INSEE/Postal code: 39490 /39120
- ^{1} French Land Register data, which excludes lakes, ponds, glaciers > 1 km^{2} (0.386 sq mi or 247 acres) and river estuaries.

Saint-Loup (French pronunciation: [sɛ̃ lu]) is a commune in the Jura department in the Bourgogne-Franche-Comté region in eastern France.

== Population ==
Historical population
Year	Pop.	±% p.a.
1968	277	—
1975	257	−1.06%
1982	263	+0.33%
1990	263	+0.00%
1999	279	+0.66%
2007	258	−0.97%
2012	281	+1.72%
2017	272	−0.65%
2023	248	−1.53%
Source: INSEE

== See also ==
- Communes of the Jura department
