= Bretenières =

Commune in Bourgogne-Franche-Comté, France

- Commune
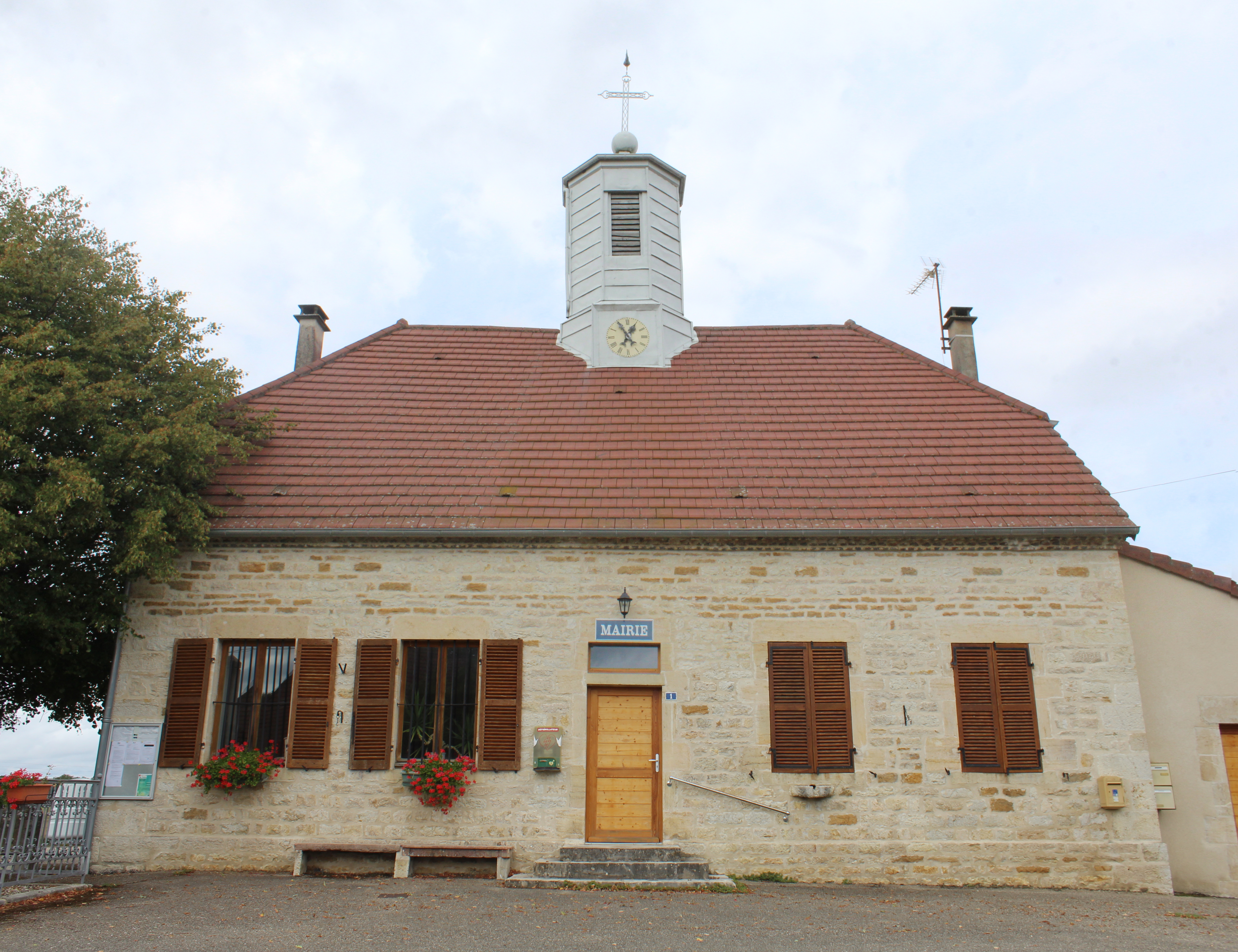
- The town hall in Bretenières

- Coat of arms
- Location of Bretenières
- Location within France Location within Bourgogne-Franche-Comté
- Coordinates: 46°55′10″N 5°32′35″E
- Country: France
- Region: Bourgogne-Franche-Comté
- Department: Jura
- Arrondissement: Dole
- Canton: Tavaux

Government
  - Mayor (2020–2026): Alain Schmitt
- Area^{1}: 4.11 km^{2} (1.59 sq mi)
- Highest elevation: 245 m (804 ft)
- Lowest elevation: 213 m (699 ft)
- Population (2023): 44
  - Density: 11/km^{2} (28/sq mi)
- Time zone: UTC+01:00 (CET)
  - Summer (DST): UTC+02:00 (CEST)
- INSEE/Postal code: 39077 /39120
- ^{1} French Land Register data, which excludes lakes, ponds, glaciers > 1 km^{2} (0.386 sq mi or 247 acres) and river estuaries.

Bretenières (French pronunciation: [bʁətnjɛʁ]) is a commune in the Jura department in Bourgogne-Franche-Comté in eastern France.

== Population ==
Historical population
Year	Pop.	±% p.a.
1968	50	—
1975	34	−5.36%
1982	27	−3.24%
1990	28	+0.46%
1999	30	+0.77%
2007	36	+2.31%
2012	40	+2.13%
2017	40	+0.00%
2023	44	+1.60%
Source: INSEE

== See also ==
- Communes of the Jura department
