= Gatey =

Commune in Bourgogne-Franche-Comté, France

- Commune
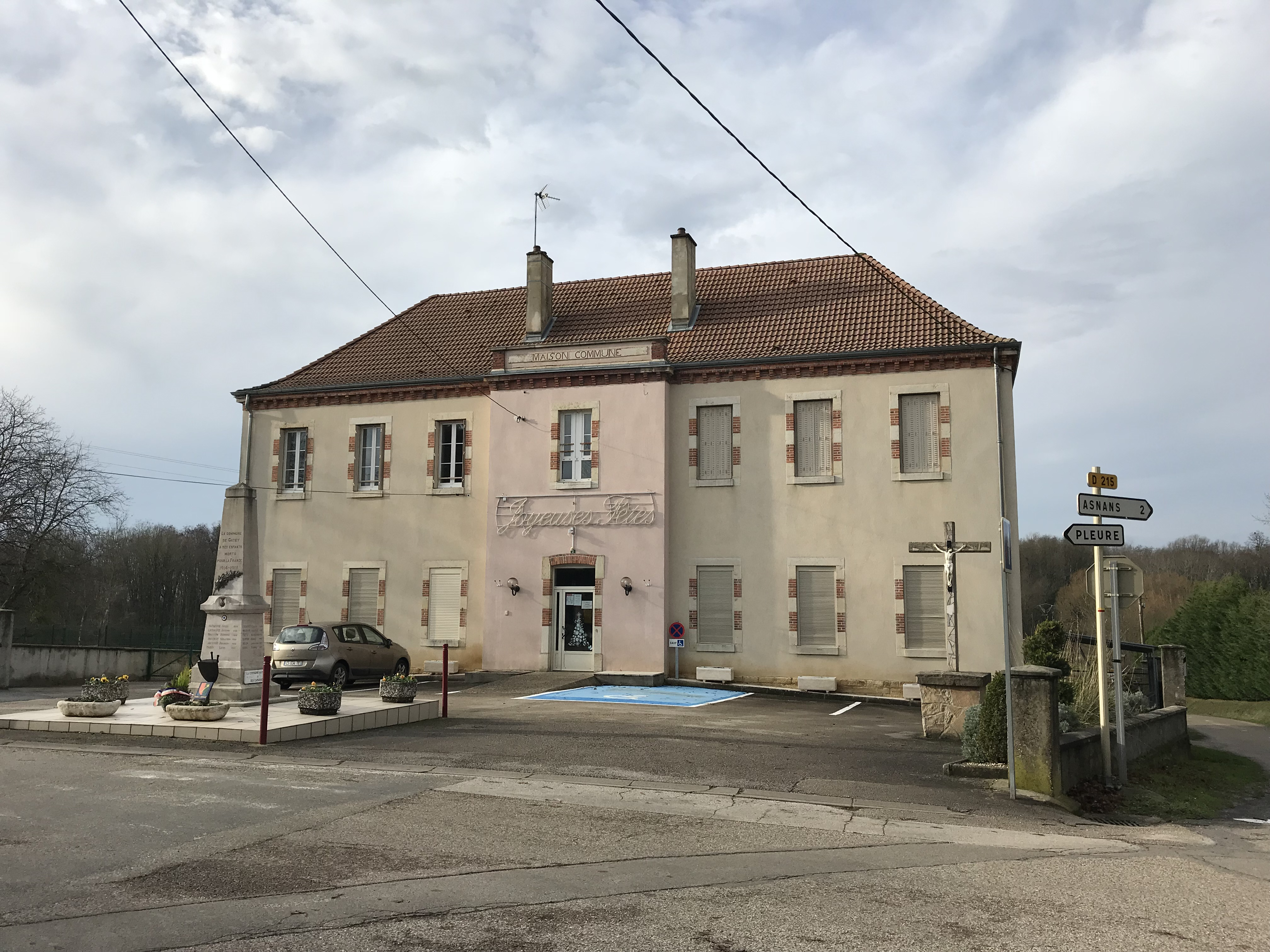
- The town hall in Gatey
- Location of Gatey
- Location within France Location within Bourgogne-Franche-Comté
- Coordinates: 46°56′48″N 5°26′09″E
- Country: France
- Region: Bourgogne-Franche-Comté
- Department: Jura
- Arrondissement: Dole
- Canton: Tavaux

Government
  - Mayor (2020–2026): Marc Schmieder
- Area^{1}: 14.84 km^{2} (5.73 sq mi)
- Highest elevation: 223 m (732 ft)
- Lowest elevation: 197 m (646 ft)
- Population (2023): 373
  - Density: 25.1/km^{2} (65.1/sq mi)
- Time zone: UTC+01:00 (CET)
  - Summer (DST): UTC+02:00 (CEST)
- INSEE/Postal code: 39245 /39120
- ^{1} French Land Register data, which excludes lakes, ponds, glaciers > 1 km^{2} (0.386 sq mi or 247 acres) and river estuaries.

Gatey (French pronunciation: [ɡatɛ]) is a commune in the Jura department in Bourgogne-Franche-Comté in eastern France.

== Population ==
Historical population
Year	Pop.	±% p.a.
1968	271	—
1975	240	−1.72%
1982	229	−0.67%
1990	256	+1.40%
1999	247	−0.40%
2007	305	+2.67%
2012	377	+4.33%
2017	371	−0.32%
2023	373	+0.09%
Source: INSEE

== See also ==
- Communes of the Jura department
