= Abergement-la-Ronce =

Commune in Bourgogne-Franche-Comté, France

- Commune
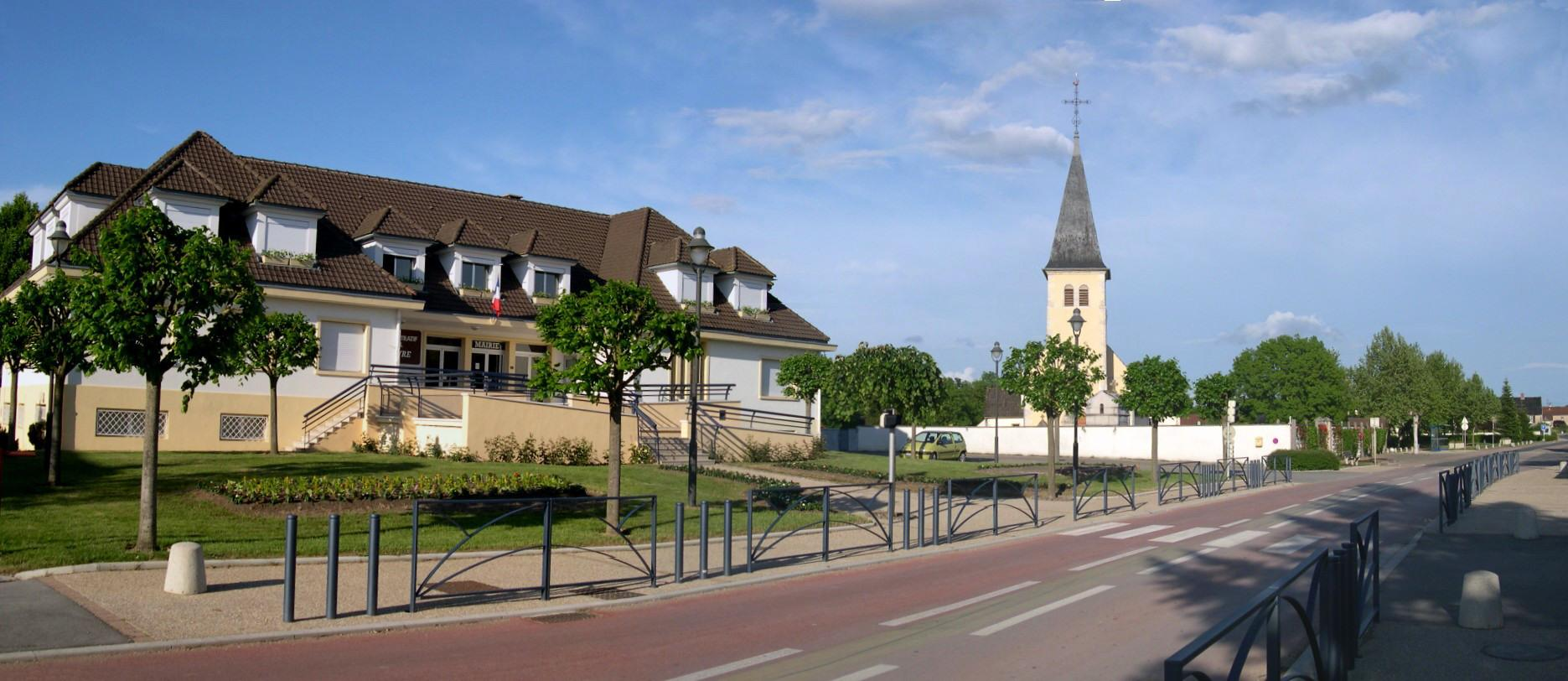
- Town hall
- Location of Abergement-la-Ronce
- Location within France Location within Bourgogne-Franche-Comté
- Coordinates: 47°04′15″N 5°22′11″E
- Country: France
- Region: Bourgogne-Franche-Comté
- Department: Jura
- Arrondissement: Dole
- Canton: Tavaux
- Intercommunality: CA Grand Dole

Government
  - Mayor (2020–2026): Joëlle Lepetz
- Area^{1}: 7.12 km^{2} (2.75 sq mi)
- Highest elevation: 195 m (640 ft)
- Lowest elevation: 186 m (610 ft)
- Population (2023): 827
  - Density: 116/km^{2} (301/sq mi)
- Demonym(s): Abergeois, Abergeoises
- Time zone: UTC+01:00 (CET)
  - Summer (DST): UTC+02:00 (CEST)
- INSEE/Postal code: 39001 /39500
- ^{1} French Land Register data, which excludes lakes, ponds, glaciers > 1 km^{2} (0.386 sq mi or 247 acres) and river estuaries.

Abergement-la-Ronce (French pronunciation: [abɛʁʒəmɑ̃ la ʁɔ̃s]) is a commune in the Jura department in the region of Bourgogne-Franche-Comté in eastern France.

== Population ==
Historical population

Year	Pop.	±% p.a.
1793	254	—
1821	283	+0.39%
1846	316	+0.44%
1872	326	+0.12%
1901	346	+0.21%
1926	277	−0.89%
1946	322	+0.76%
1962	417	+1.63%
1968	454	+1.43%

Year	Pop.	±% p.a.
1975	610	+4.31%
1982	677	+1.50%
1990	667	−0.19%
1999	735	+1.08%
2007	743	+0.14%
2012	780	+0.98%
2017	849	+1.71%
2023	827	−0.44%

Source: EHESS (1793-1999) and INSEE

== See also ==
- Communes of the Jura department
