= Peseux, Jura =

Commune in Bourgogne-Franche-Comté, France

Peseux
- Commune
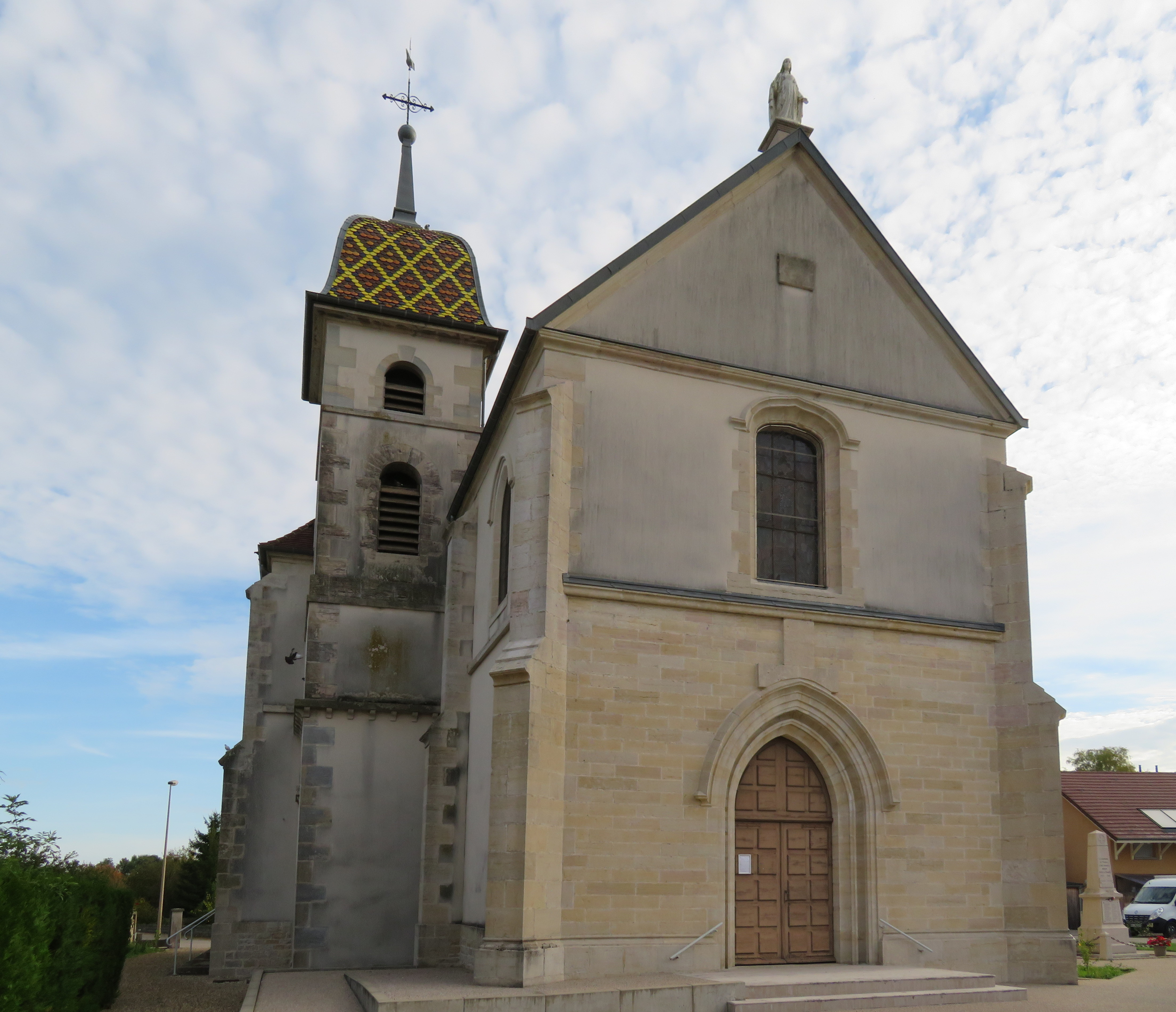
- The church in Peseux
- Location of Peseux
- Location within France Location within Bourgogne-Franche-Comté
- Coordinates: 46°59′37″N 5°22′02″E
- Country: France
- Region: Bourgogne-Franche-Comté
- Department: Jura
- Arrondissement: Dole
- Canton: Tavaux
- Intercommunality: CA Grand Dole

Government
  - Mayor (2020–2026): Christian Mathez
- Area^{1}: 5.36 km^{2} (2.07 sq mi)
- Highest elevation: 190 m (620 ft)
- Lowest elevation: 187 m (614 ft)
- Population (2023): 293
  - Density: 54.7/km^{2} (142/sq mi)
- Time zone: UTC+01:00 (CET)
  - Summer (DST): UTC+02:00 (CEST)
- INSEE/Postal code: 39412 /39120
- ^{1} French Land Register data, which excludes lakes, ponds, glaciers > 1 km^{2} (0.386 sq mi or 247 acres) and river estuaries.

Peseux (French pronunciation: [pəzø]) is a commune in the Jura department in Bourgogne-Franche-Comté in eastern France.

== Population ==
Historical population
Year	Pop.	±% p.a.
1968	210	—
1975	229	+1.25%
1982	322	+4.99%
1990	257	−2.78%
1999	248	−0.40%
2007	276	+1.35%
2012	301	+1.75%
2017	320	+1.23%
2023	293	−1.46%
Source: INSEE

== See also ==
- Communes of the Jura department
