= Les Hays =

Commune in Bourgogne-Franche-Comté, France

- Commune
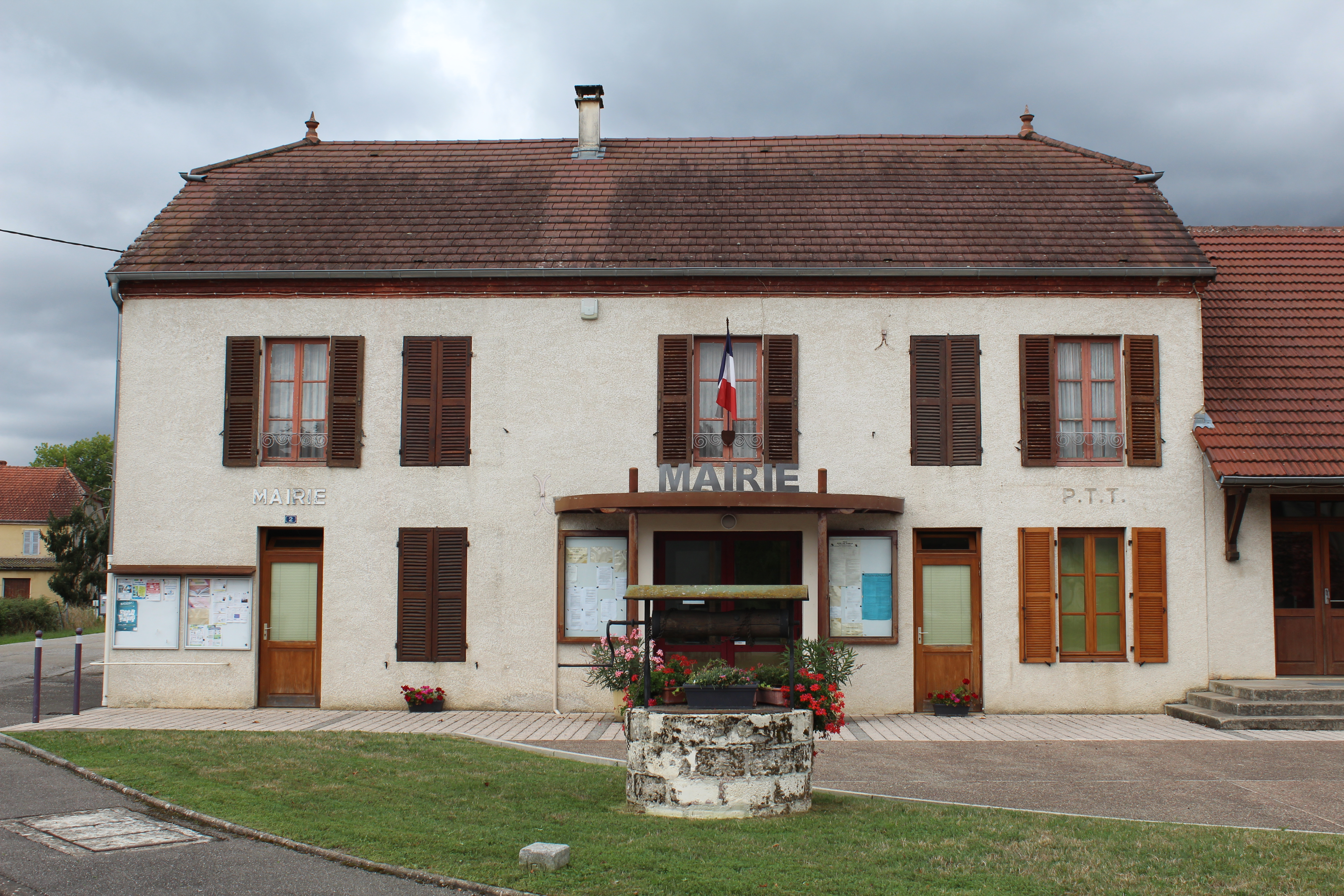
- The town hall in Les Hays
- Location of Les Hays
- Location within France Location within Bourgogne-Franche-Comté
- Coordinates: 46°54′19″N 5°23′20″E
- Country: France
- Region: Bourgogne-Franche-Comté
- Department: Jura
- Arrondissement: Dole
- Canton: Tavaux

Government
  - Mayor (2020–2026): Claude Buchaillot
- Area^{1}: 6.80 km^{2} (2.63 sq mi)
- Highest elevation: 219 m (719 ft)
- Lowest elevation: 197 m (646 ft)
- Population (2023): 362
  - Density: 53.2/km^{2} (138/sq mi)
- Time zone: UTC+01:00 (CET)
  - Summer (DST): UTC+02:00 (CEST)
- INSEE/Postal code: 39266 /39120
- ^{1} French Land Register data, which excludes lakes, ponds, glaciers > 1 km^{2} (0.386 sq mi or 247 acres) and river estuaries.

Les Hays is a commune in the Jura department in Bourgogne-Franche-Comté in eastern France.

== Population ==
Historical population
Year	Pop.	±% p.a.
1968	293	—
1975	238	−2.93%
1982	254	+0.93%
1990	241	−0.65%
1999	270	+1.27%
2007	263	−0.33%
2012	300	+2.67%
2017	331	+1.99%
2023	362	+1.50%
Source: INSEE

== See also ==
- Communes of the Jura department
