= Pleure =

Commune in Bourgogne-Franche-Comté, France

- Commune
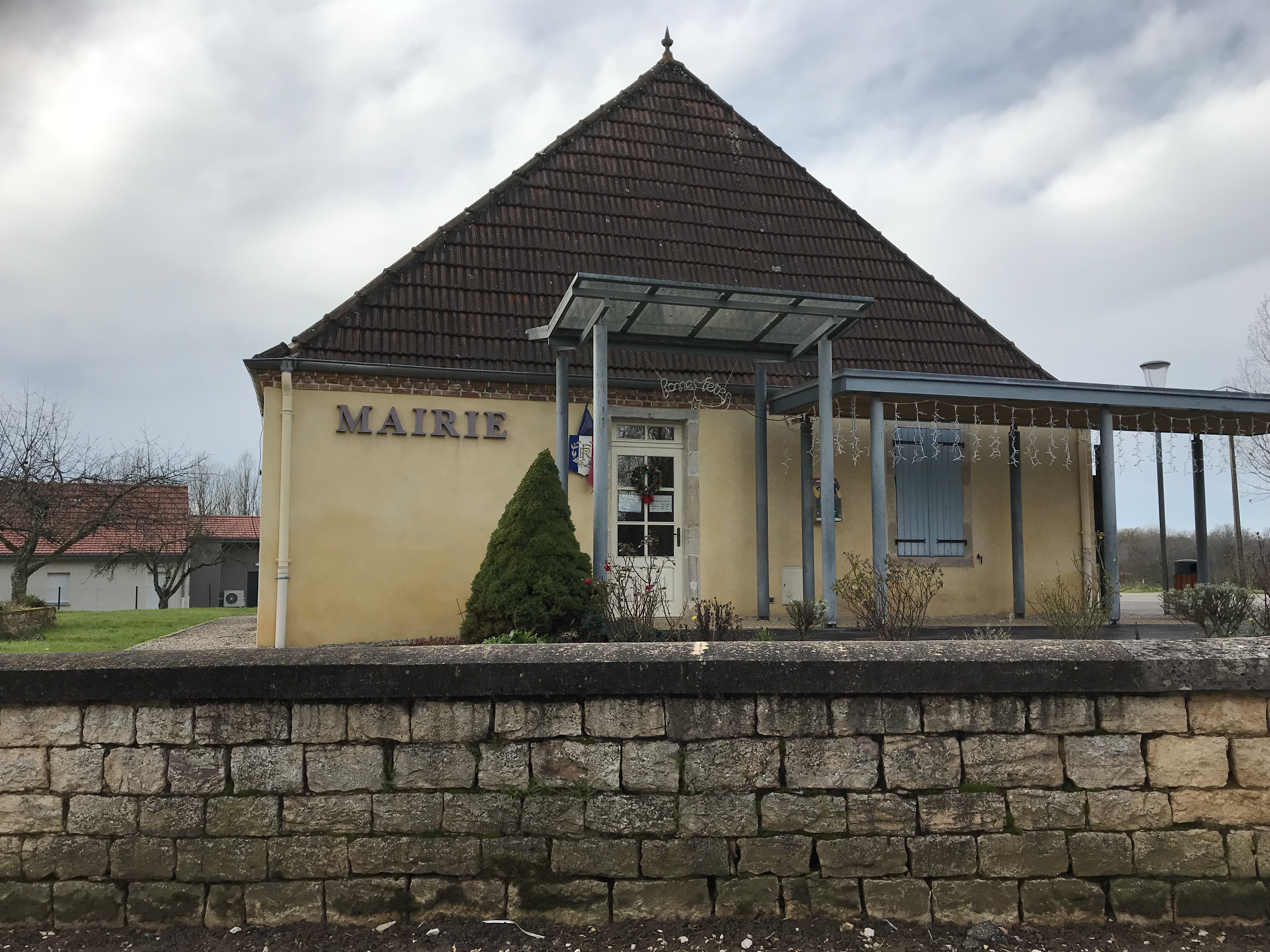
- The town hall in Pleure
- Location of Pleure
- Location within France Location within Bourgogne-Franche-Comté
- Coordinates: 46°54′56″N 5°27′30″E
- Country: France
- Region: Bourgogne-Franche-Comté
- Department: Jura
- Arrondissement: Dole
- Canton: Tavaux
- Intercommunality: Plaine Jurassienne

Government
  - Mayor (2020–2026): Alexandre Crot
- Area^{1}: 5.07 km^{2} (1.96 sq mi)
- Highest elevation: 222 m (728 ft)
- Lowest elevation: 197 m (646 ft)
- Population (2023): 435
  - Density: 85.8/km^{2} (222/sq mi)
- Time zone: UTC+01:00 (CET)
  - Summer (DST): UTC+02:00 (CEST)
- INSEE/Postal code: 39429 /39120
- ^{1} French Land Register data, which excludes lakes, ponds, glaciers > 1 km^{2} (0.386 sq mi or 247 acres) and river estuaries.

Pleure (French pronunciation: [plœʁ]) is a commune in the Jura department and Bourgogne-Franche-Comté region of eastern France.

== Population ==
Historical population
Year	Pop.	±% p.a.
1968	378	—
1975	340	−1.50%
1982	379	+1.56%
1990	364	−0.50%
1999	346	−0.56%
2007	410	+2.14%
2012	442	+1.51%
2017	429	−0.60%
2023	435	+0.23%
Source: INSEE

== See also ==
- Communes of the Jura department
