= Aumur =

Commune in Bourgogne-Franche-Comté, France

- Commune
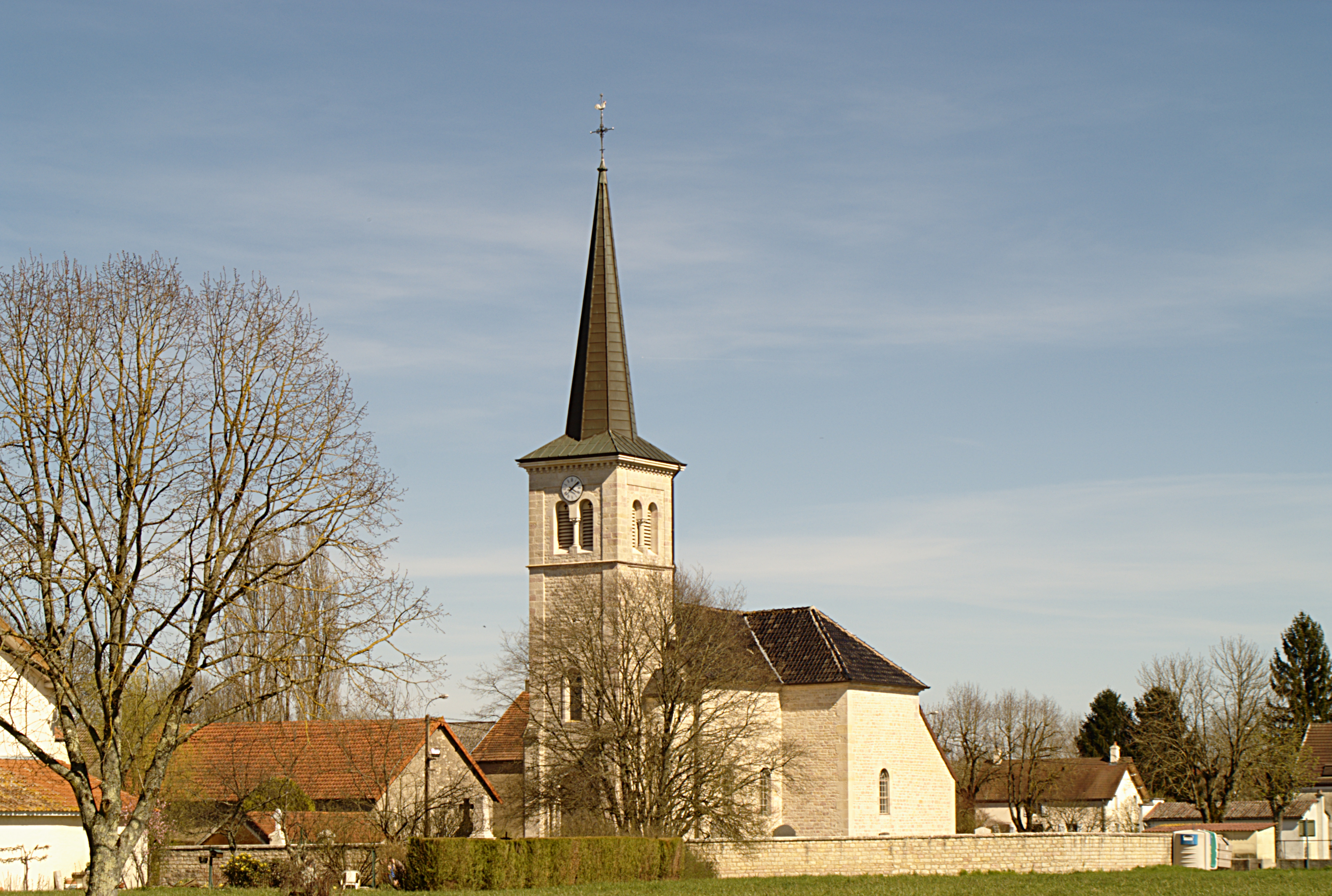
- The church in Aumur
- Location of Aumur
- Location within France Location within Bourgogne-Franche-Comté
- Coordinates: 47°03′34″N 5°20′59″E
- Country: France
- Region: Bourgogne-Franche-Comté
- Department: Jura
- Arrondissement: Dole
- Canton: Tavaux
- Intercommunality: CA Grand Dole

Government
  - Mayor (2020–2026): Bruno Chevaux
- Area^{1}: 9.22 km^{2} (3.56 sq mi)
- Highest elevation: 191 m (627 ft)
- Lowest elevation: 181 m (594 ft)
- Population (2023): 393
  - Density: 42.6/km^{2} (110/sq mi)
- Time zone: UTC+01:00 (CET)
  - Summer (DST): UTC+02:00 (CEST)
- INSEE/Postal code: 39029 /39410
- ^{1} French Land Register data, which excludes lakes, ponds, glaciers > 1 km^{2} (0.386 sq mi or 247 acres) and river estuaries.

Aumur (French pronunciation: [omyʁ]) is a commune in the Jura department in the region of Bourgogne-Franche-Comté in eastern France.

== Population ==
Historical population
Year	Pop.	±% p.a.
1968	231	—
1975	259	+1.65%
1982	325	+3.30%
1990	314	−0.43%
1999	343	+0.99%
2007	360	+0.61%
2012	366	+0.33%
2017	366	+0.00%
2023	393	+1.19%
Source: INSEE

== See also ==
- Communes of the Jura department
