= Chaînée-des-Coupis =

Commune in Bourgogne-Franche-Comté, France

- Commune
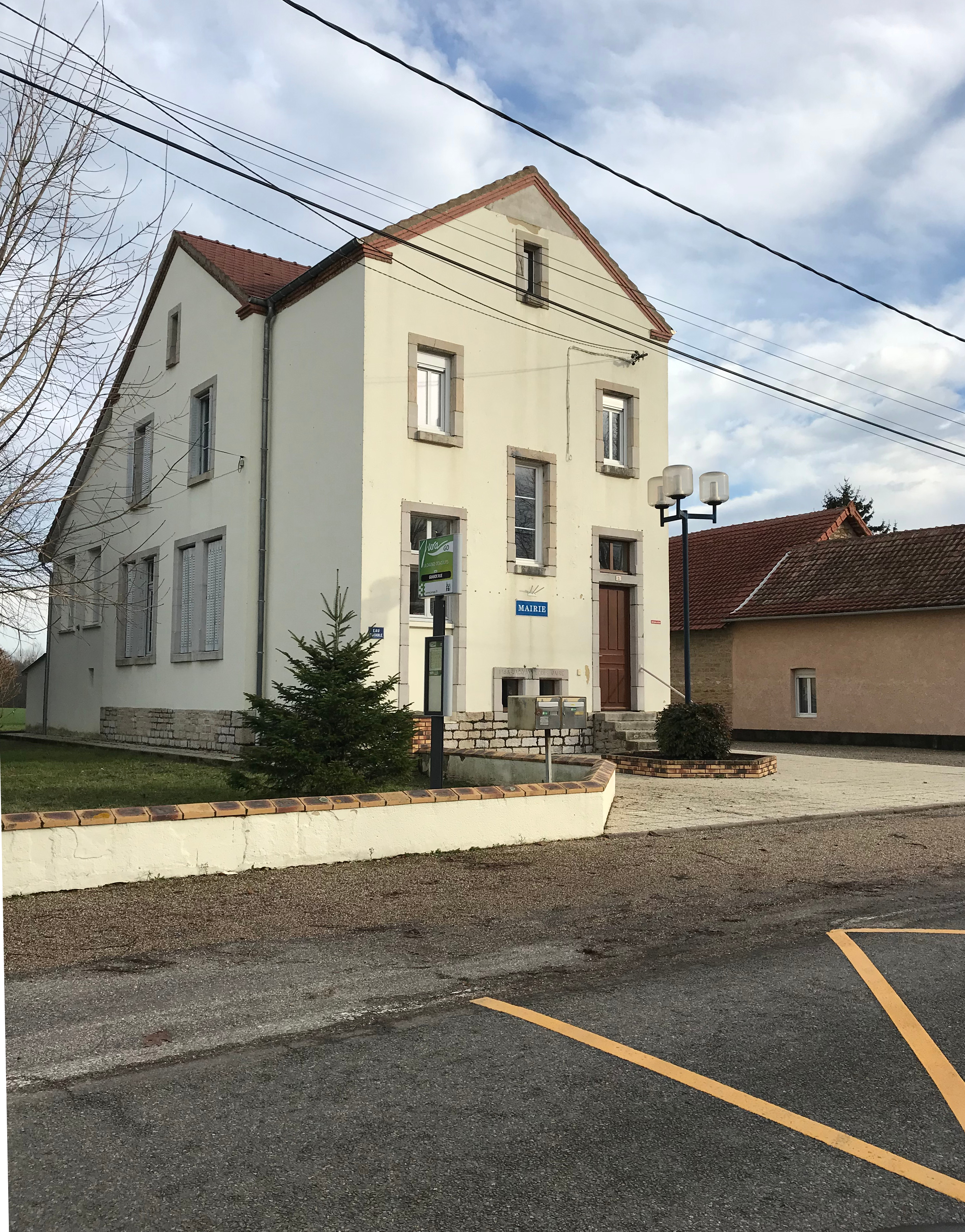
- The town hall in Chaînée-des-Coupis
- Location of Chaînée-des-Coupis
- Location within France Location within Bourgogne-Franche-Comté
- Coordinates: 46°55′39″N 5°26′33″E
- Country: France
- Region: Bourgogne-Franche-Comté
- Department: Jura
- Arrondissement: Dole
- Canton: Tavaux

Government
  - Mayor (2020–2026): Yannick Arragon
- Area^{1}: 5.04 km^{2} (1.95 sq mi)
- Highest elevation: 220 m (720 ft)
- Lowest elevation: 203 m (666 ft)
- Population (2023): 183
  - Density: 36.3/km^{2} (94.0/sq mi)
- Time zone: UTC+01:00 (CET)
  - Summer (DST): UTC+02:00 (CEST)
- INSEE/Postal code: 39090 /39120
- ^{1} French Land Register data, which excludes lakes, ponds, glaciers > 1 km^{2} (0.386 sq mi or 247 acres) and river estuaries.

Chaînée-des-Coupis (French pronunciation: [ʃene de kupi]) is a commune in the Jura department in Bourgogne-Franche-Comté in eastern France.

== Population ==
Historical population
Year	Pop.	±% p.a.
1968	125	—
1975	112	−1.56%
1982	119	+0.87%
1990	125	+0.62%
1999	138	+1.11%
2007	165	+2.26%
2012	191	+2.97%
2017	181	−1.07%
2023	183	+0.18%
Source: INSEE

== See also ==
- Communes of the Jura department
