= Chaussin =

Commune in Bourgogne-Franche-Comté, France

- Commune
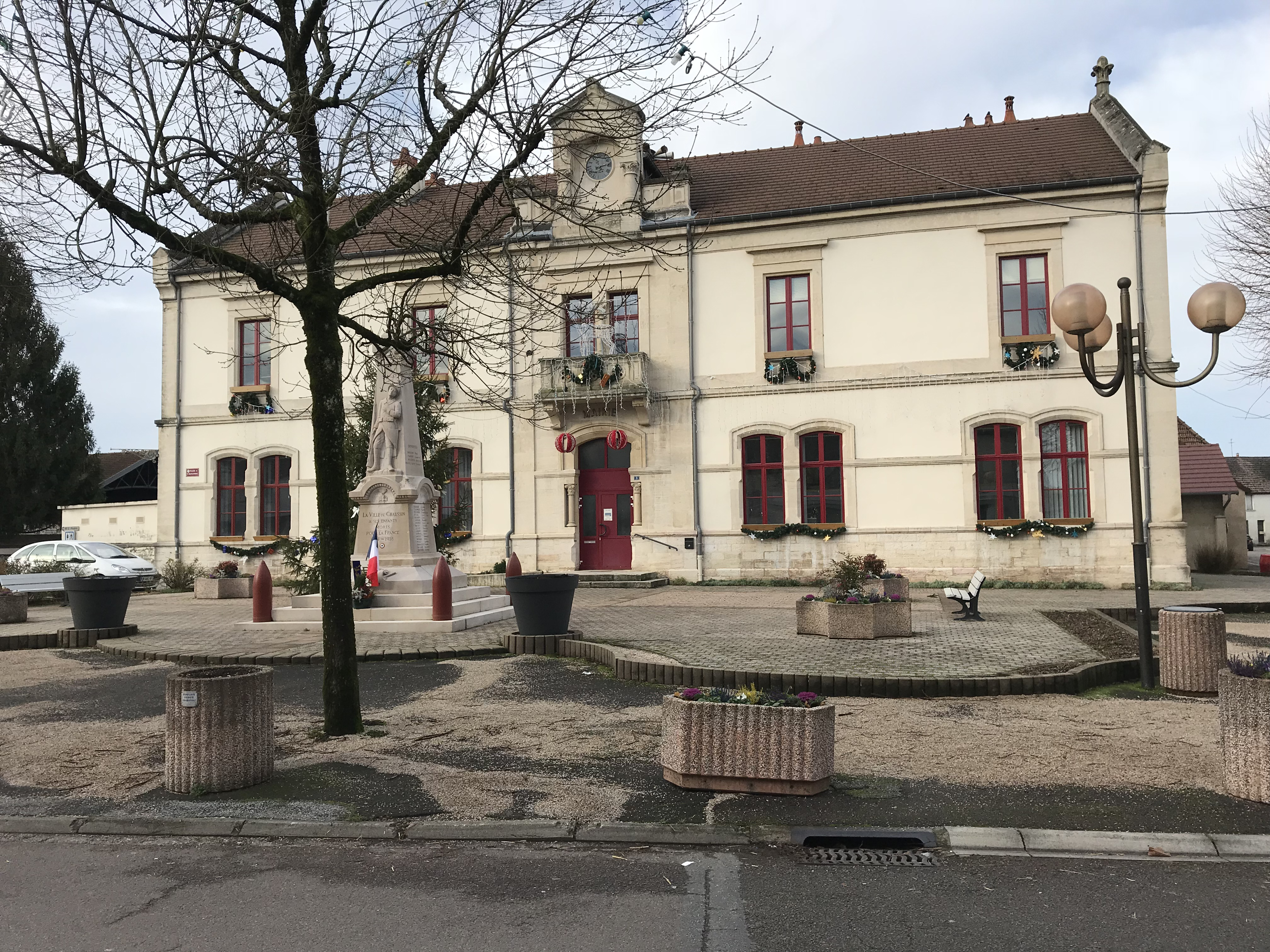
- The town hall in Chaussin

- Coat of arms
- Location of Chaussin
- Location within France Location within Bourgogne-Franche-Comté
- Coordinates: 46°57′55″N 5°24′38″E
- Country: France
- Region: Bourgogne-Franche-Comté
- Department: Jura
- Arrondissement: Dole
- Canton: Tavaux

Government
  - Mayor (2020–2026): Chantal Torck
- Area^{1}: 16.82 km^{2} (6.49 sq mi)
- Highest elevation: 214 m (702 ft)
- Lowest elevation: 183 m (600 ft)
- Population (2023): 1,606
  - Density: 95.48/km^{2} (247.3/sq mi)
- Time zone: UTC+01:00 (CET)
  - Summer (DST): UTC+02:00 (CEST)
- INSEE/Postal code: 39128 /39120
- ^{1} French Land Register data, which excludes lakes, ponds, glaciers > 1 km^{2} (0.386 sq mi or 247 acres) and river estuaries.

Chaussin (French pronunciation: [ʃosɛ̃]) is a commune in the Jura department in Bourgogne-Franche-Comté in eastern France.

== Population ==
Historical population
Year	Pop.	±% p.a.
1968	1,282	—
1975	1,274	−0.09%
1982	1,487	+2.23%
1990	1,587	+0.82%
1999	1,579	−0.06%
2007	1,601	+0.17%
2012	1,658	+0.70%
2017	1,630	−0.34%
2023	1,606	−0.25%
Source: INSEE

== See also ==
- Communes of the Jura department
