= Saint-Baraing =

Commune in Bourgogne-Franche-Comté, France

- Commune
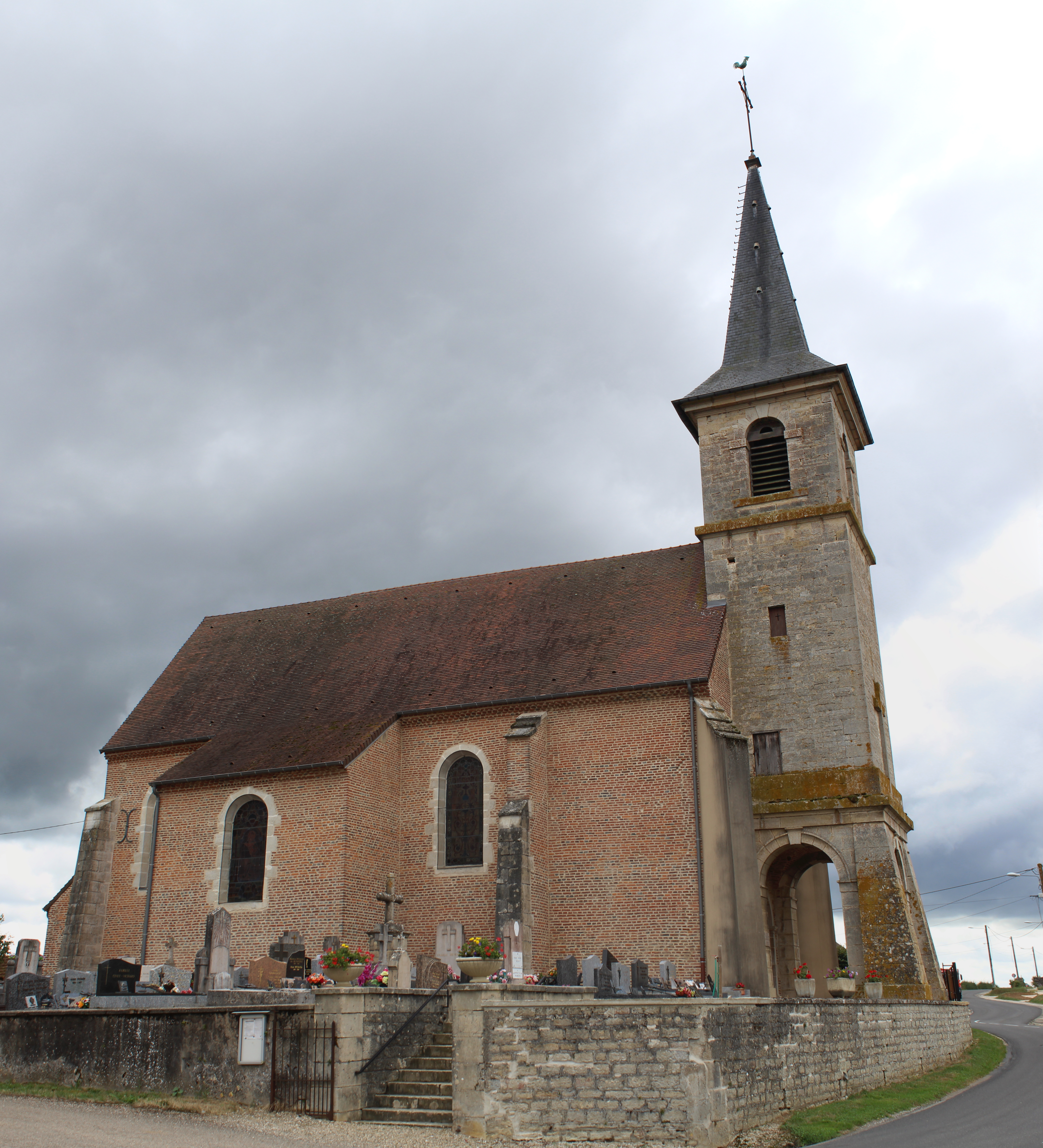
- The church in Saint-Baraing
- Location of Saint-Baraing
- Location within France Location within Bourgogne-Franche-Comté
- Coordinates: 46°58′56″N 5°25′54″E
- Country: France
- Region: Bourgogne-Franche-Comté
- Department: Jura
- Arrondissement: Dole
- Canton: Tavaux

Government
  - Mayor (2020–2026): Robert Michaud
- Area^{1}: 6.28 km^{2} (2.42 sq mi)
- Highest elevation: 217 m (712 ft)
- Lowest elevation: 187 m (614 ft)
- Population (2023): 257
  - Density: 40.9/km^{2} (106/sq mi)
- Time zone: UTC+01:00 (CET)
  - Summer (DST): UTC+02:00 (CEST)
- INSEE/Postal code: 39477 /39120
- ^{1} French Land Register data, which excludes lakes, ponds, glaciers > 1 km^{2} (0.386 sq mi or 247 acres) and river estuaries.

Saint-Baraing (French pronunciation: [sɛ̃ baʁɛ̃]) is a village and commune in the Jura department in the Bourgogne-Franche-Comté region in eastern France.

== Population ==
Historical population
Year	Pop.	±% p.a.
1968	164	—
1975	153	−0.99%
1982	178	+2.19%
1990	194	+1.08%
1999	181	−0.77%
2007	202	+1.38%
2012	288	+7.35%
2017	261	−1.95%
2023	257	−0.26%
Source: INSEE

== See also ==
- Communes of the Jura department
