= Neublans-Abergement =

Commune in Bourgogne-Franche-Comté, France

- Commune
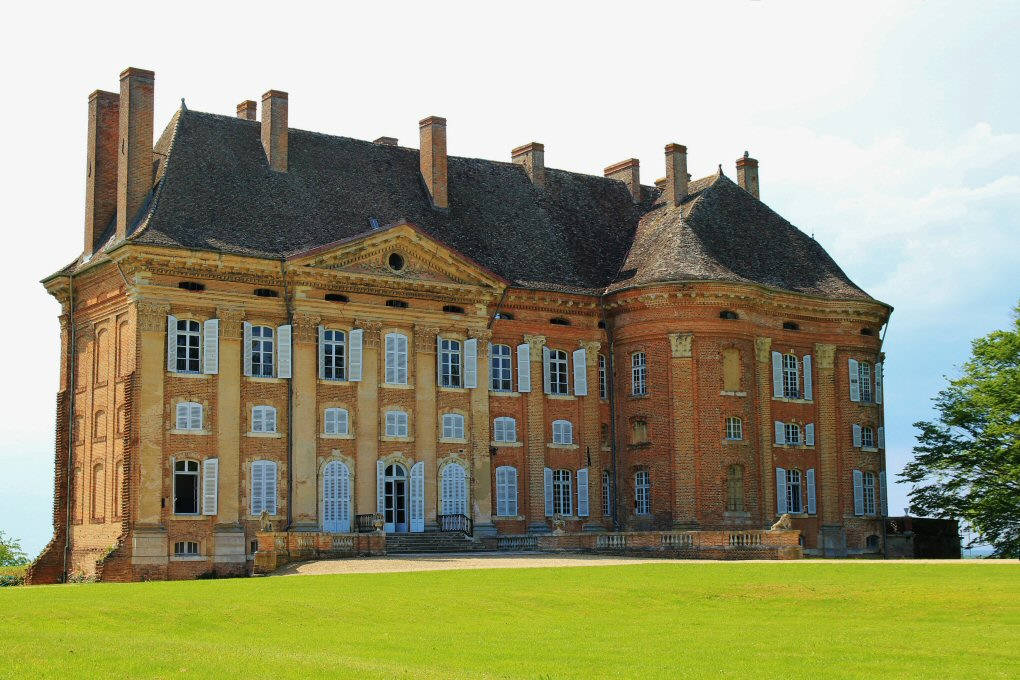
- The chateau in Neublans
- Location of Neublans-Abergement
- Location within France Location within Bourgogne-Franche-Comté
- Coordinates: 46°54′37″N 5°19′50″E
- Country: France
- Region: Bourgogne-Franche-Comté
- Department: Jura
- Arrondissement: Dole
- Canton: Tavaux

Government
  - Mayor (2020–2026): Guy Savoye
- Area^{1}: 11.64 km^{2} (4.49 sq mi)
- Highest elevation: 215 m (705 ft)
- Lowest elevation: 180 m (590 ft)
- Population (2023): 536
  - Density: 46.0/km^{2} (119/sq mi)
- Time zone: UTC+01:00 (CET)
  - Summer (DST): UTC+02:00 (CEST)
- INSEE/Postal code: 39385 /39120
- ^{1} French Land Register data, which excludes lakes, ponds, glaciers > 1 km^{2} (0.386 sq mi or 247 acres) and river estuaries.

Neublans-Abergement is a commune in the Jura department in Bourgogne-Franche-Comté in eastern France.

== Population ==
Historical population
Year	Pop.	±% p.a.
1968	499	—
1975	430	−2.10%
1982	383	−1.64%
1990	362	−0.70%
1999	389	+0.80%
2007	450	+1.84%
2012	529	+3.29%
2017	545	+0.60%
2023	536	−0.28%
Source: INSEE

== See also ==
- Communes of the Jura department
