= Annoire =

Commune in Bourgogne-Franche-Comté, France

- Commune
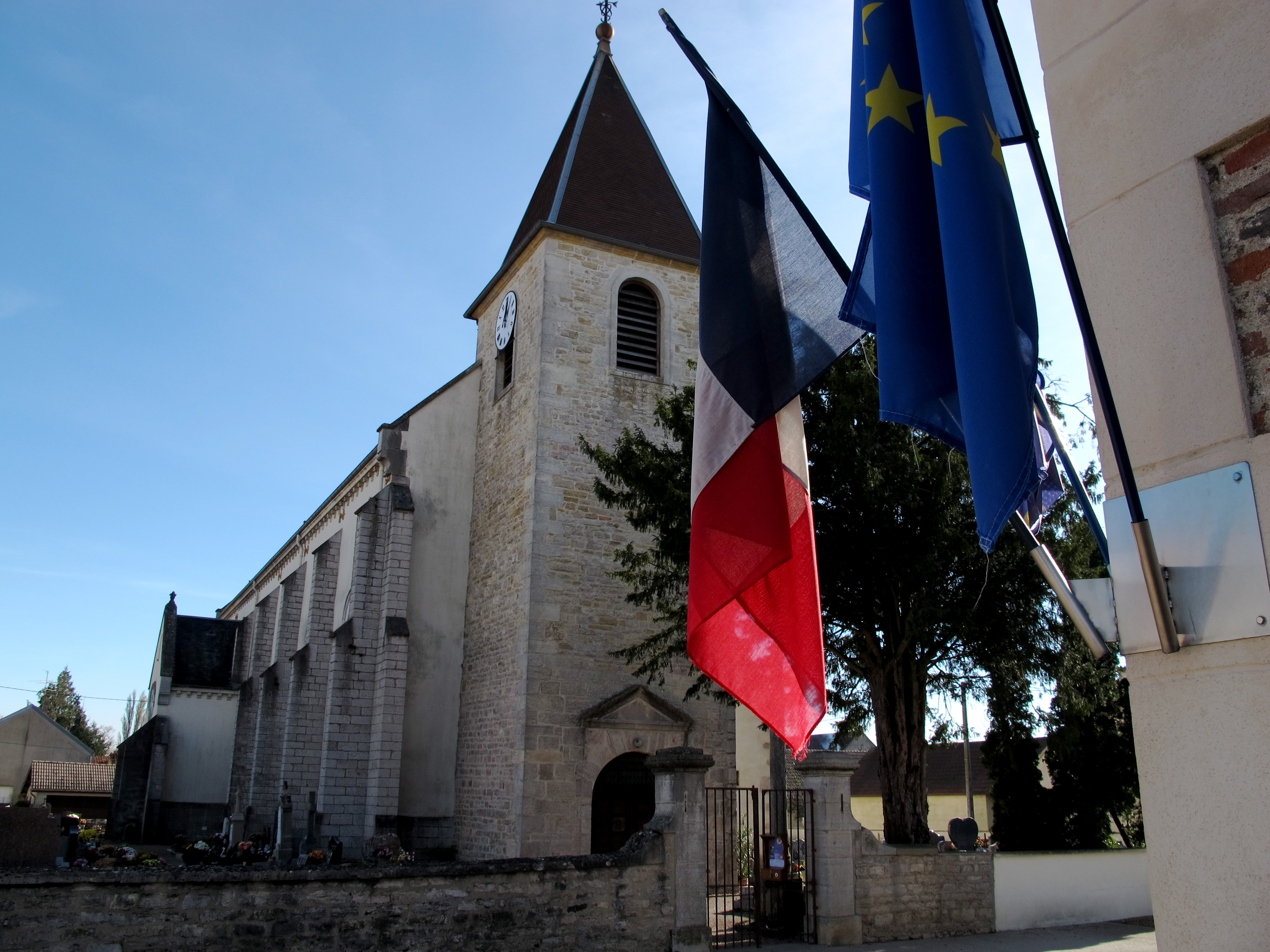
- The church in Annoire
- Location of Annoire
- Location within France Location within Bourgogne-Franche-Comté
- Coordinates: 46°57′33″N 5°16′45″E
- Country: France
- Region: Bourgogne-Franche-Comté
- Department: Jura
- Arrondissement: Dole
- Canton: Tavaux

Government
  - Mayor (2020–2026): Christian Lagalice
- Area^{1}: 15.69 km^{2} (6.06 sq mi)
- Highest elevation: 186 m (610 ft)
- Lowest elevation: 177 m (581 ft)
- Population (2023): 423
  - Density: 27.0/km^{2} (69.8/sq mi)
- Time zone: UTC+01:00 (CET)
  - Summer (DST): UTC+02:00 (CEST)
- INSEE/Postal code: 39011 /39120
- ^{1} French Land Register data, which excludes lakes, ponds, glaciers > 1 km^{2} (0.386 sq mi or 247 acres) and river estuaries.

Annoire (French pronunciation: [anwaʁ]) is a commune in the Jura department in the region of Bourgogne-Franche-Comté in eastern France.

== Population ==
Historical population
Year	Pop.	±% p.a.
1968	490	—
1975	426	−1.98%
1982	439	+0.43%
1990	401	−1.13%
1999	411	+0.27%
2007	404	−0.21%
2012	387	−0.86%
2017	377	−0.52%
2023	423	+1.94%
Source: INSEE

== See also ==
- Communes of the Jura department
