= Villers-Robert =

- Commune
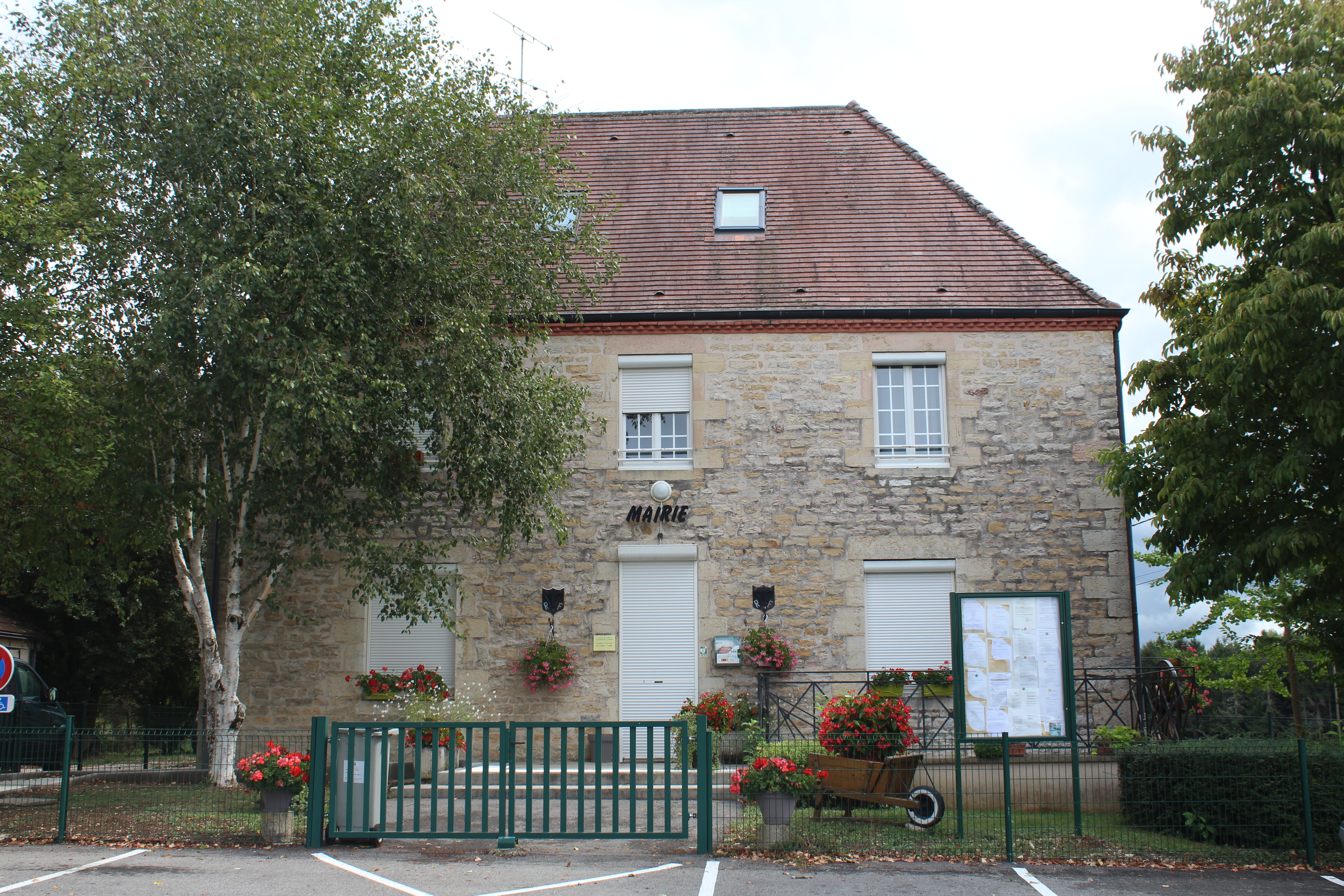
- The town hall in Villers-Robert
- Location of Villers-Robert
- Location within France Location within Bourgogne-Franche-Comté
- Coordinates: 46°57′11″N 5°31′15″E
- Country: France
- Region: Bourgogne-Franche-Comté
- Department: Jura
- Arrondissement: Dole
- Canton: Tavaux
- Intercommunality: CA Grand Dole

Government
  - Mayor (2020–2026): Maurice Hoffmann
- Area^{1}: 10.13 km^{2} (3.91 sq mi)
- Highest elevation: 243 m (797 ft)
- Lowest elevation: 202 m (663 ft)
- Population (2023): 236
  - Density: 23.3/km^{2} (60.3/sq mi)
- Time zone: UTC+01:00 (CET)
  - Summer (DST): UTC+02:00 (CEST)
- INSEE/Postal code: 39571 /39120
- ^{1} French Land Register data, which excludes lakes, ponds, glaciers > 1 km^{2} (0.386 sq mi or 247 acres) and river estuaries.

Villers-Robert (French pronunciation: [vilɛʁ ʁɔbɛʁ]) is a commune in the Jura department in the Bourgogne-Franche-Comté region in eastern France.

== Population ==
Historical population
Year	Pop.	±% p.a.
1968	143	—
1975	113	−3.31%
1982	155	+4.62%
1990	148	−0.58%
1999	157	+0.66%
2007	195	+2.75%
2012	214	+1.88%
2017	231	+1.54%
2023	236	+0.36%
Source: INSEE

== See also ==
- Communes of the Jura department
