= Canton of Tavaux =

Coordinates: 47.04°N 5.41°E

The canton of Tavaux is an administrative division of the Jura department, eastern France. It was created at the French canton reorganisation which came into effect in March 2015. Its seat is in Tavaux.

It consists of the following communes:

1. Abergement-la-Ronce
2. Annoire
3. Asnans-Beauvoisin
4. Aumur
5. Balaiseaux
6. Bretenières
7. Chaînée-des-Coupis
8. Champdivers
9. Chaussin
10. Chemin
11. Chêne-Bernard
12. Le Deschaux
13. Les Essards-Taignevaux
14. Gatey
15. Les Hays
16. Longwy-sur-le-Doubs
17. Molay
18. Neublans-Abergement
19. Peseux
20. Petit-Noir
21. Pleure
22. Rahon
23. Saint-Aubin
24. Saint-Baraing
25. Saint-Loup
26. Séligney
27. Tassenières
28. Tavaux
29. Villers-Robert
