= Petit-Noir =

Commune in Bourgogne-Franche-Comté, France

- Commune
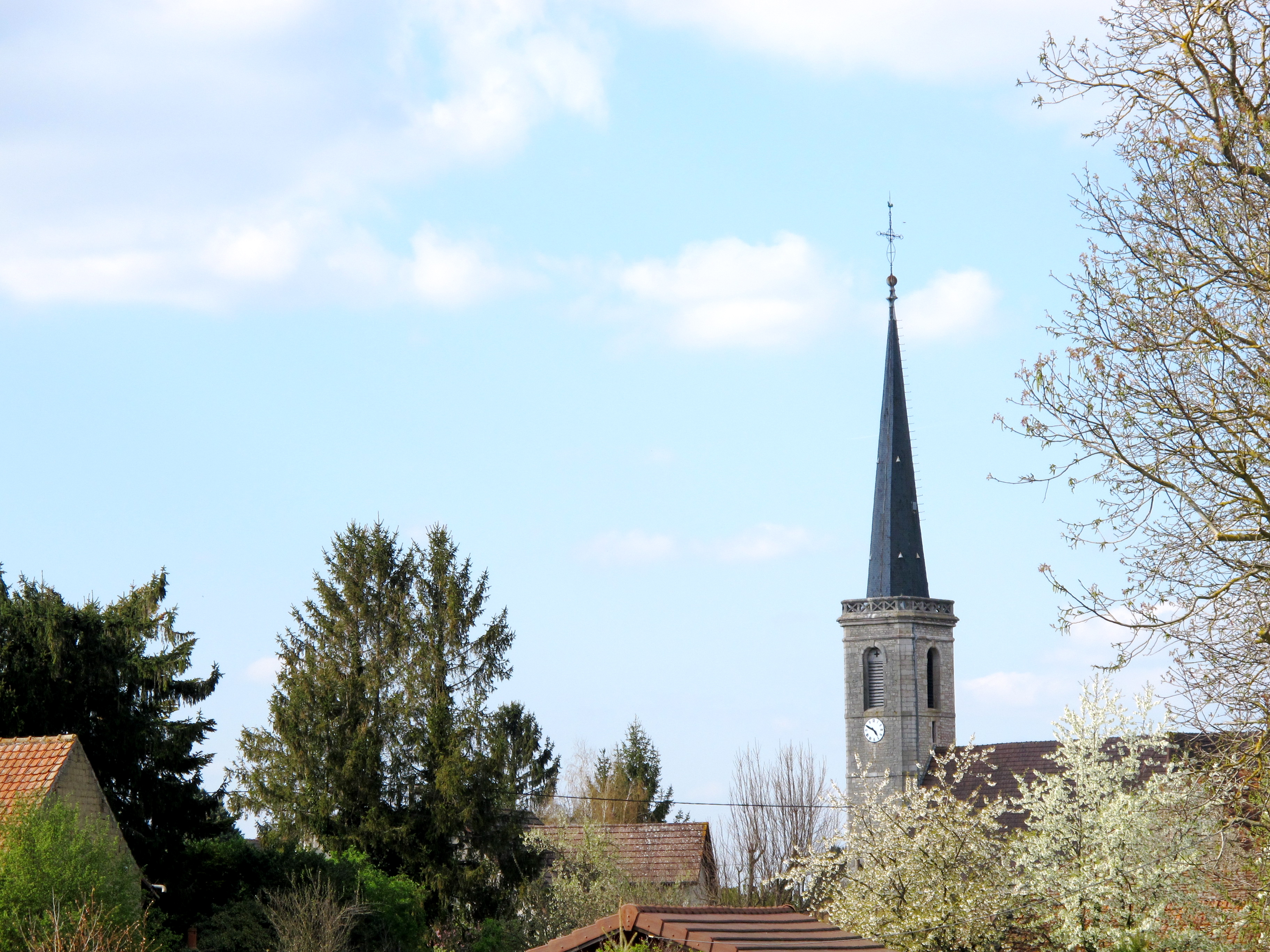
- The church tower in Petit-Noir
- Location of Petit-Noir
- Location within France Location within Bourgogne-Franche-Comté
- Coordinates: 46°56′17″N 5°20′34″E
- Country: France
- Region: Bourgogne-Franche-Comté
- Department: Jura
- Arrondissement: Dole
- Canton: Tavaux

Government
  - Mayor (2020–2026): Étienne Cordier
- Area^{1}: 20.52 km^{2} (7.92 sq mi)
- Highest elevation: 215 m (705 ft)
- Lowest elevation: 177 m (581 ft)
- Population (2023): 1,056
  - Density: 51.46/km^{2} (133.3/sq mi)
- Time zone: UTC+01:00 (CET)
  - Summer (DST): UTC+02:00 (CEST)
- INSEE/Postal code: 39415 /39120
- ^{1} French Land Register data, which excludes lakes, ponds, glaciers > 1 km^{2} (0.386 sq mi or 247 acres) and river estuaries.

Petit-Noir (French pronunciation: [pəti nwaʁ]) is a commune in the Jura department in Bourgogne-Franche-Comté in eastern France.

== Population ==
Historical population
Year	Pop.	±% p.a.
1968	717	—
1975	804	+1.65%
1982	929	+2.09%
1990	938	+0.12%
1999	974	+0.42%
2007	1,159	+2.20%
2012	1,140	−0.33%
2017	1,093	−0.84%
2023	1,056	−0.57%
Source: INSEE

== See also ==
- Communes of the Jura department
