= Arrondissement of Dole =

Coordinates: 47°05′N 5°29′E

Dole
- Arrondissement
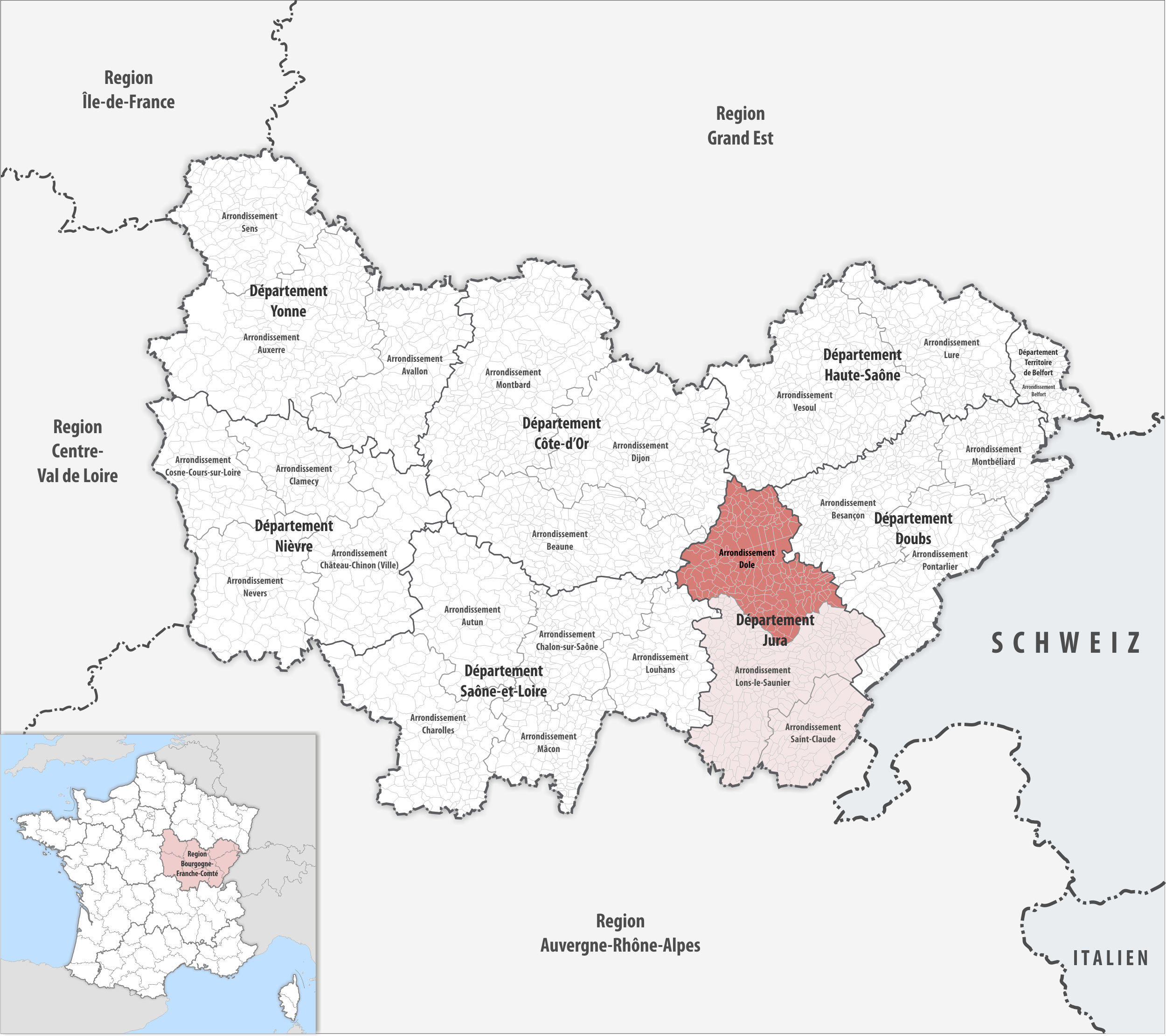
- Location within the region Bourgogne-Franche-Comté
- Country: France
- Region: Bourgogne-Franche-Comté
- Department: Jura
- No. of communes: {{{nbcomm}}}
- Area: 1,769.5 km^{2} (683.2 sq mi)
- Population (2023): 105,872
  - Density: 59.832/km^{2} (154.96/sq mi)
- INSEE code: 391

The arrondissement of Dole is an arrondissement of France in the Jura department in the Bourgogne-Franche-Comté region. It has 189 communes. Its population is 106,169 (2021), and its area is 1,769.5 km^{2} (683.2 sq mi).

== Composition ==
The communes of the arrondissement of Dole are:

1. Abergement-la-Ronce
2. Abergement-le-Grand
3. Abergement-le-Petit
4. Abergement-lès-Thésy
5. Aiglepierre
6. Amange
7. Annoire
8. Arbois
9. Archelange
10. Aresches
11. Les Arsures
12. Asnans-Beauvoisin
13. Audelange
14. Augerans
15. Aumont
16. Aumur
17. Authume
18. Auxange
19. Balaiseaux
20. Bans
21. La Barre
22. Barretaine
23. Baverans
24. Belmont
25. Bersaillin
26. Besain
27. Biarne
28. Biefmorin
29. Bracon
30. Brainans
31. Brans
32. La Bretenière
33. Bretenières
34. Brevans
35. Buvilly
36. Cernans
37. Chaînée-des-Coupis
38. Chamblay
39. Chamole
40. Champagne-sur-Loue
41. Champagney
42. Champdivers
43. Champvans
44. La Chapelle-sur-Furieuse
45. La Châtelaine
46. Chatelay
47. Le Chateley
48. Châtenois
49. Chaussenans
50. Chaussin
51. Chaux-Champagny
52. Chemin
53. Chêne-Bernard
54. Chevigny
55. Chilly-sur-Salins
56. Chissey-sur-Loue
57. Choisey
58. Clucy
59. Colonne
60. Courtefontaine
61. Cramans
62. Crissey
63. Dammartin-Marpain
64. Damparis
65. Dampierre
66. Darbonnay
67. Le Deschaux
68. Dole
69. Dournon
70. Éclans-Nenon
71. Écleux
72. Les Essards-Taignevaux
73. Étrepigney
74. Évans
75. Falletans
76. Fay-en-Montagne
77. La Ferté
78. Le Fied
79. Foucherans
80. Fraisans
81. Frasne-les-Meulières
82. Gatey
83. Gendrey
84. Geraise
85. Germigney
86. Gevry
87. Grange-de-Vaivre
88. Gredisans
89. Grozon
90. Les Hays
91. Ivory
92. Ivrey
93. Jouhe
94. Lavangeot
95. Lavans-lès-Dole
96. Lemuy
97. Longwy-sur-le-Doubs
98. Louvatange
99. La Loye
100. Malange
101. Marnoz
102. Mathenay
103. Menotey
104. Mesnay
105. Miéry
106. Moissey
107. Molain
108. Molamboz
109. Molay
110. Monay
111. Monnières
112. Montbarrey
113. Monteplain
114. Montholier
115. Montigny-lès-Arsures
116. Montmarlon
117. Montmirey-la-Ville
118. Montmirey-le-Château
119. Mont-sous-Vaudrey
120. Mouchard
121. Mutigney
122. Neublans-Abergement
123. Neuvilley
124. Nevy-lès-Dole
125. Offlanges
126. Orchamps
127. Ougney
128. Ounans
129. Our
130. Oussières
131. Pagney
132. Pagnoz
133. Parcey
134. Peintre
135. Peseux
136. Petit-Noir
137. Picarreau
138. Les Planches-près-Arbois
139. Plasne
140. Pleure
141. Plumont
142. Pointre
143. Poligny
144. Pont-d'Héry
145. Port-Lesney
146. Pretin
147. Pupillin
148. Rahon
149. Rainans
150. Ranchot
151. Rans
152. Rochefort-sur-Nenon
153. Romain
154. Romange
155. Rouffange
156. Saint-Aubin
157. Saint-Baraing
158. Saint-Cyr-Montmalin
159. Saint-Lothain
160. Saint-Loup
161. Saint-Thiébaud
162. Saizenay
163. Salans
164. Saligney
165. Salins-les-Bains
166. Sampans
167. Santans
168. Séligney
169. Sermange
170. Serre-les-Moulières
171. Souvans
172. Tassenières
173. Tavaux
174. Taxenne
175. Thervay
176. Thésy
177. Tourmont
178. Vadans
179. Vaudrey
180. La Vieille-Loye
181. Villeneuve-d'Aval
182. Villerserine
183. Villers-Farlay
184. Villers-les-Bois
185. Villers-Robert
186. Villette-lès-Arbois
187. Villette-lès-Dole
188. Vitreux
189. Vriange

== History ==
The arrondissement of Dole was created in 1800. In May 2006 it gained the canton of Villers-Farlay from the arrondissement of Lons-le-Saunier, and it lost the canton of Chaumergy to the arrondissement of Lons-le-Saunier. At the January 2017 reorganisation of the arrondissements of Jura, it gained 67 communes from the arrondissement of Lons-le-Saunier.

As a result of the reorganisation of the cantons of France which came into effect in 2015, the borders of the cantons are no longer related to the borders of the arrondissements. The cantons of the arrondissement of Dole were, as of January 2015:

1. Chaussin
2. Chemin
3. Dampierre
4. Dole-Nord-Est
5. Dole-Sud-Ouest
6. Gendrey
7. Montbarrey
8. Montmirey-le-Château
9. Rochefort-sur-Nenon
10. Villers-Farlay
