= Les Essards-Taignevaux =

Commune in Bourgogne-Franche-Comté, France

- Commune
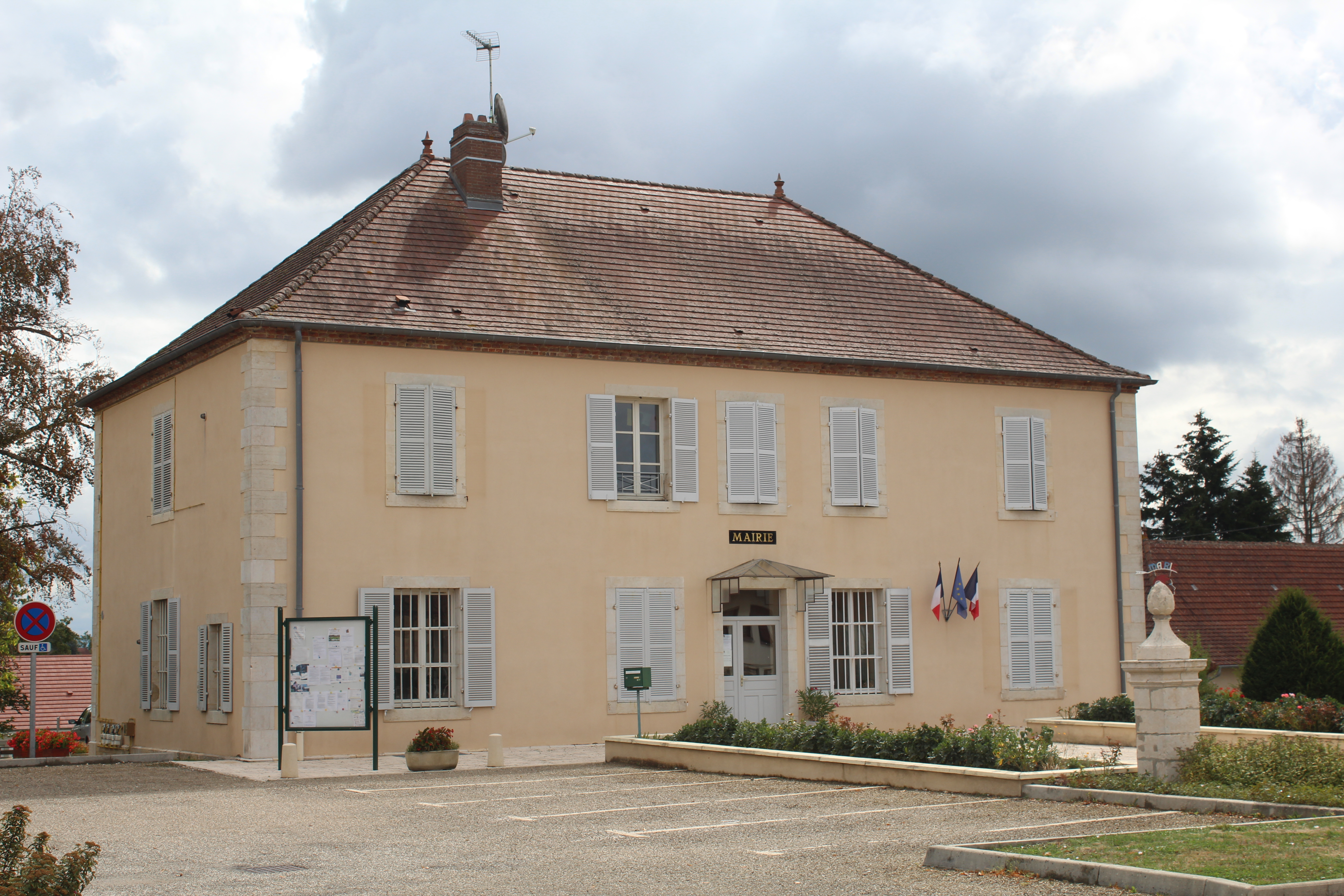
- The town hall in Les Essards-Taignevaux
- Location of Les Essards-Taignevaux
- Location within France Location within Bourgogne-Franche-Comté
- Coordinates: 46°54′41″N 5°25′06″E
- Country: France
- Region: Bourgogne-Franche-Comté
- Department: Jura
- Arrondissement: Dole
- Canton: Tavaux

Government
  - Mayor (2020–2026): Michel Jeandot
- Area^{1}: 5.40 km^{2} (2.08 sq mi)
- Highest elevation: 219 m (719 ft)
- Lowest elevation: 193 m (633 ft)
- Population (2023): 248
  - Density: 45.9/km^{2} (119/sq mi)
- Time zone: UTC+01:00 (CET)
  - Summer (DST): UTC+02:00 (CEST)
- INSEE/Postal code: 39211 /39120
- ^{1} French Land Register data, which excludes lakes, ponds, glaciers > 1 km^{2} (0.386 sq mi or 247 acres) and river estuaries.

Les Essards-Taignevaux (French pronunciation: [lez‿esaʁ tɛɲvo]) is a commune in the Jura department in Bourgogne-Franche-Comté in eastern France.

== Population ==
Historical population
| Year | Pop. | ±% p.a. |
|---|---|---|
| 1968 | 210 | — |
| 1975 | 199 | −0.77% |
| 1982 | 163 | −2.81% |
| 1990 | 204 | +2.84% |
| 1999 | 217 | +0.69% |
| 2007 | 237 | +1.11% |
| 2012 | 258 | +1.71% |
| 2017 | 260 | +0.15% |
| 2023 | 248 | −0.78% |
Source: INSEE

== See also ==
- Communes of the Jura department
