= Rahon, Jura =

Commune in Bourgogne-Franche-Comté, France

Rahon
- Commune
- Location of Rahon
- Location within France Location within Bourgogne-Franche-Comté
- Coordinates: 46°59′15″N 5°27′43″E
- Country: France
- Region: Bourgogne-Franche-Comté
- Department: Jura
- Arrondissement: Dole
- Canton: Tavaux

Government
  - Mayor (2020–2026): Bernard Pusset
- Area^{1}: 19.60 km^{2} (7.57 sq mi)
- Highest elevation: 243 m (797 ft)
- Lowest elevation: 191 m (627 ft)
- Population (2023): 444
  - Density: 22.7/km^{2} (58.7/sq mi)
- Time zone: UTC+01:00 (CET)
  - Summer (DST): UTC+02:00 (CEST)
- INSEE/Postal code: 39448 /39120
- ^{1} French Land Register data, which excludes lakes, ponds, glaciers > 1 km^{2} (0.386 sq mi or 247 acres) and river estuaries.

Rahon (French pronunciation: [ʁa.ɔ̃]) is a commune in the Jura department in Bourgogne-Franche-Comté in eastern France.

== Population ==
Historical population
Year	Pop.	±% p.a.
1968	356	—
1975	367	+0.44%
1982	395	+1.06%
1990	444	+1.47%
1999	472	+0.68%
2007	528	+1.41%
2012	505	−0.89%
2017	508	+0.12%
2023	444	−2.22%
Source: INSEE

== See also ==
- Communes of the Jura department
