= Champdivers =

Commune in Bourgogne-Franche-Comté, France

- Commune
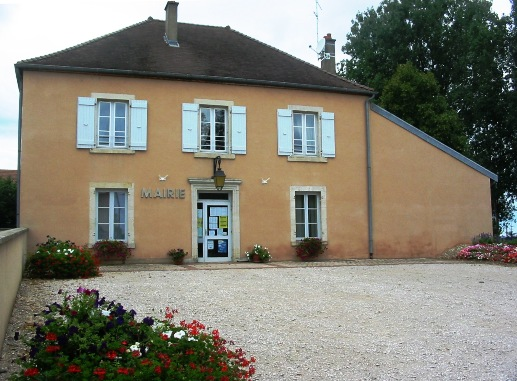
- Town hall

- Coat of arms
- Location of Champdivers
- Location within France Location within Bourgogne-Franche-Comté
- Coordinates: 47°00′37″N 5°23′10″E
- Country: France
- Region: Bourgogne-Franche-Comté
- Department: Jura
- Arrondissement: Dole
- Canton: Tavaux
- Intercommunality: CA Grand Dole

Government
  - Mayor (2020–2026): Olivier Meugin
- Area^{1}: 7.45 km^{2} (2.88 sq mi)
- Highest elevation: 192 m (630 ft)
- Lowest elevation: 187 m (614 ft)
- Population (2023): 445
  - Density: 59.7/km^{2} (155/sq mi)
- Time zone: UTC+01:00 (CET)
  - Summer (DST): UTC+02:00 (CEST)
- INSEE/Postal code: 39099 /39500
- ^{1} French Land Register data, which excludes lakes, ponds, glaciers > 1 km^{2} (0.386 sq mi or 247 acres) and river estuaries.

Champdivers (French pronunciation: [ʃɑ̃divɛʁ]) is a commune in the Jura department in Bourgogne-Franche-Comté in eastern France.

== Population ==
Historical population
Year	Pop.	±% p.a.
1968	264	—
1975	243	−1.18%
1982	385	+6.79%
1990	403	+0.57%
1999	435	+0.85%
2007	438	+0.09%
2012	451	+0.59%
2017	429	−1.00%
2023	445	+0.61%
Source: INSEE

== See also ==
- Communes of the Jura department
