= Le Deschaux =

Commune in Bourgogne-Franche-Comté, France

- Commune
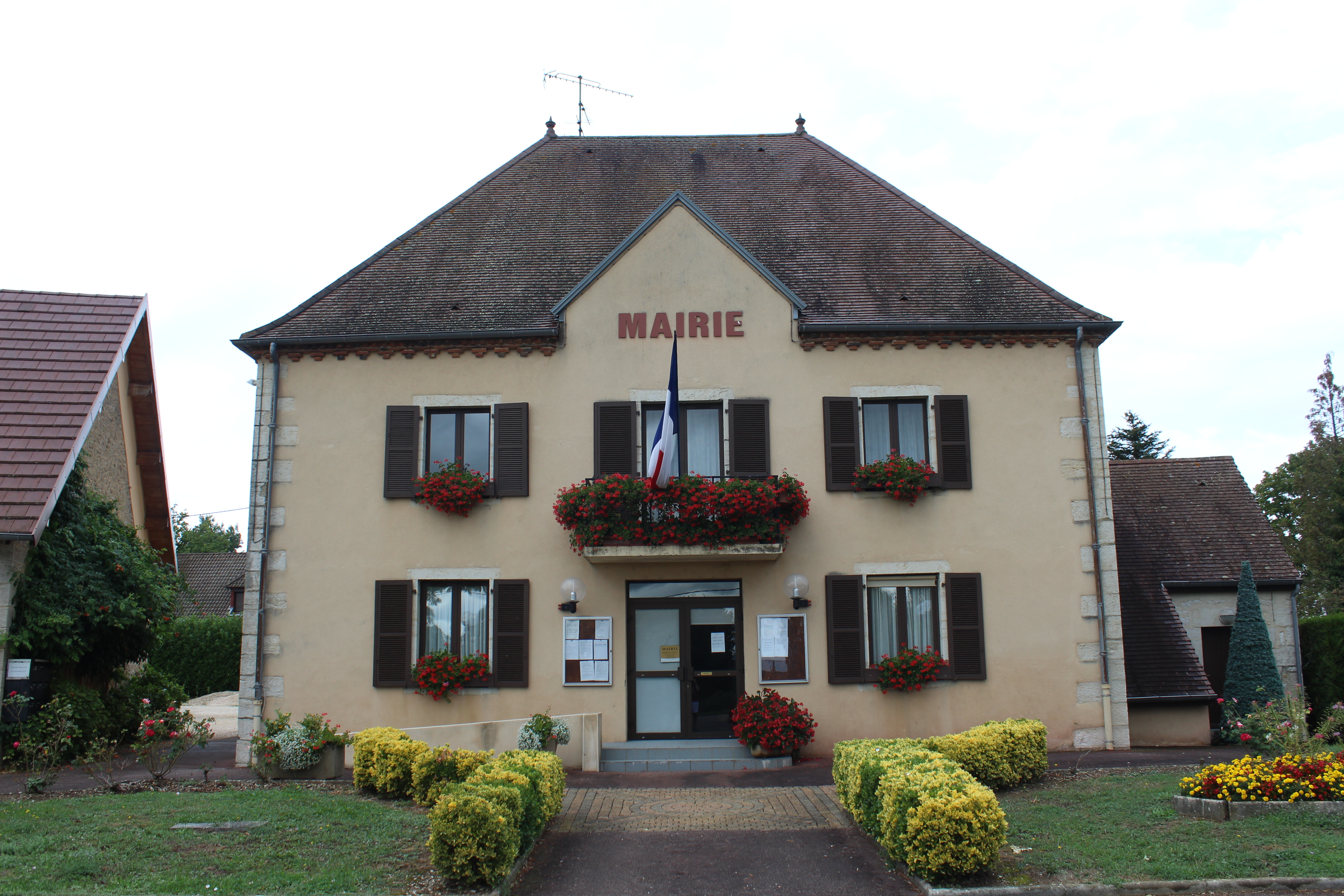
- The town hall in Le Deschaux

- Coat of arms
- Location of Le Deschaux
- Location within France Location within Bourgogne-Franche-Comté
- Coordinates: 46°57′12″N 5°30′10″E
- Country: France
- Region: Bourgogne-Franche-Comté
- Department: Jura
- Arrondissement: Dole
- Canton: Tavaux
- Intercommunality: CA Grand Dole

Government
  - Mayor (2020–2026): Patrik Jacquot
- Area^{1}: 8.56 km^{2} (3.31 sq mi)
- Highest elevation: 236 m (774 ft)
- Lowest elevation: 201 m (659 ft)
- Population (2023): 1,036
  - Density: 121/km^{2} (313/sq mi)
- Time zone: UTC+01:00 (CET)
  - Summer (DST): UTC+02:00 (CEST)
- INSEE/Postal code: 39193 /39120
- ^{1} French Land Register data, which excludes lakes, ponds, glaciers > 1 km^{2} (0.386 sq mi or 247 acres) and river estuaries.

Le Deschaux (French pronunciation: [lə deʃo]) is a commune in the Jura department in Bourgogne-Franche-Comté in eastern France.

== Population ==
Historical population
Year	Pop.	±% p.a.
1968	554	—
1975	561	+0.18%
1982	697	+3.15%
1990	757	+1.04%
1999	786	+0.42%
2007	873	+1.32%
2012	1,035	+3.46%
2017	1,021	−0.27%
2023	1,036	+0.24%
Source: INSEE

== See also ==
- Communes of the Jura department
