= Tassenières =

- Commune
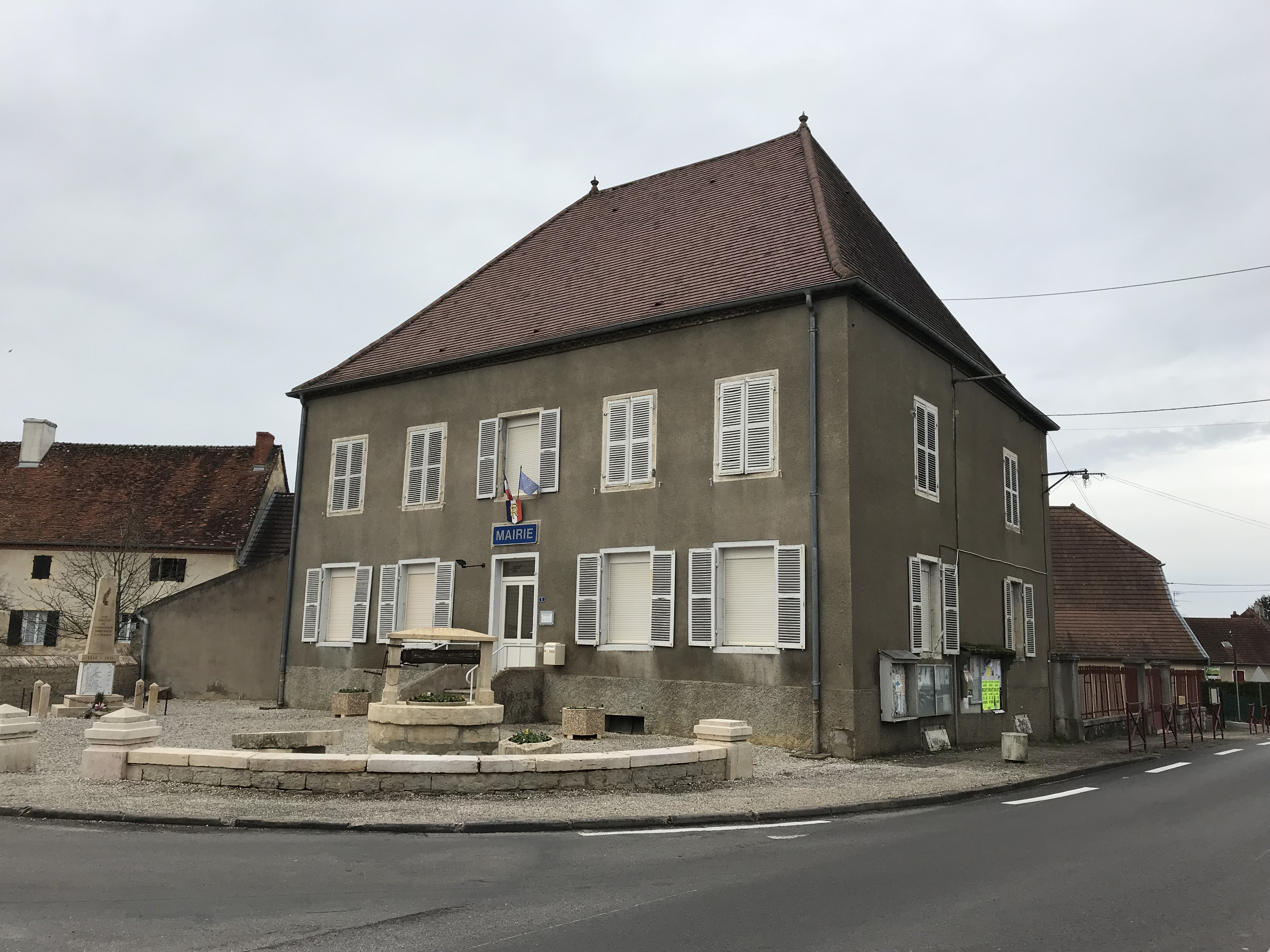
- The town hall in Tassenières
- Location of Tassenières
- Location within France Location within Bourgogne-Franche-Comté
- Coordinates: 46°55′22″N 5°30′56″E
- Country: France
- Region: Bourgogne-Franche-Comté
- Department: Jura
- Arrondissement: Dole
- Canton: Tavaux

Government
  - Mayor (2020–2026): Christian Petitjean
- Area^{1}: 6.64 km^{2} (2.56 sq mi)
- Highest elevation: 244 m (801 ft)
- Lowest elevation: 208 m (682 ft)
- Population (2023): 390
  - Density: 59/km^{2} (150/sq mi)
- Time zone: UTC+01:00 (CET)
  - Summer (DST): UTC+02:00 (CEST)
- INSEE/Postal code: 39525 /39120
- ^{1} French Land Register data, which excludes lakes, ponds, glaciers > 1 km^{2} (0.386 sq mi or 247 acres) and river estuaries.

Tassenières (French pronunciation: [tasnjɛʁ]) is a commune in the Jura department in the Bourgogne-Franche-Comté region in eastern France.

== Population ==
Historical population
Year	Pop.	±% p.a.
1968	271	—
1975	279	+0.42%
1982	334	+2.60%
1990	332	−0.08%
1999	332	+0.00%
2007	360	+1.02%
2012	390	+1.61%
2017	394	+0.20%
2023	390	−0.17%
Source: INSEE

== See also ==
- Communes of the Jura department
