= Séligney =

- Commune
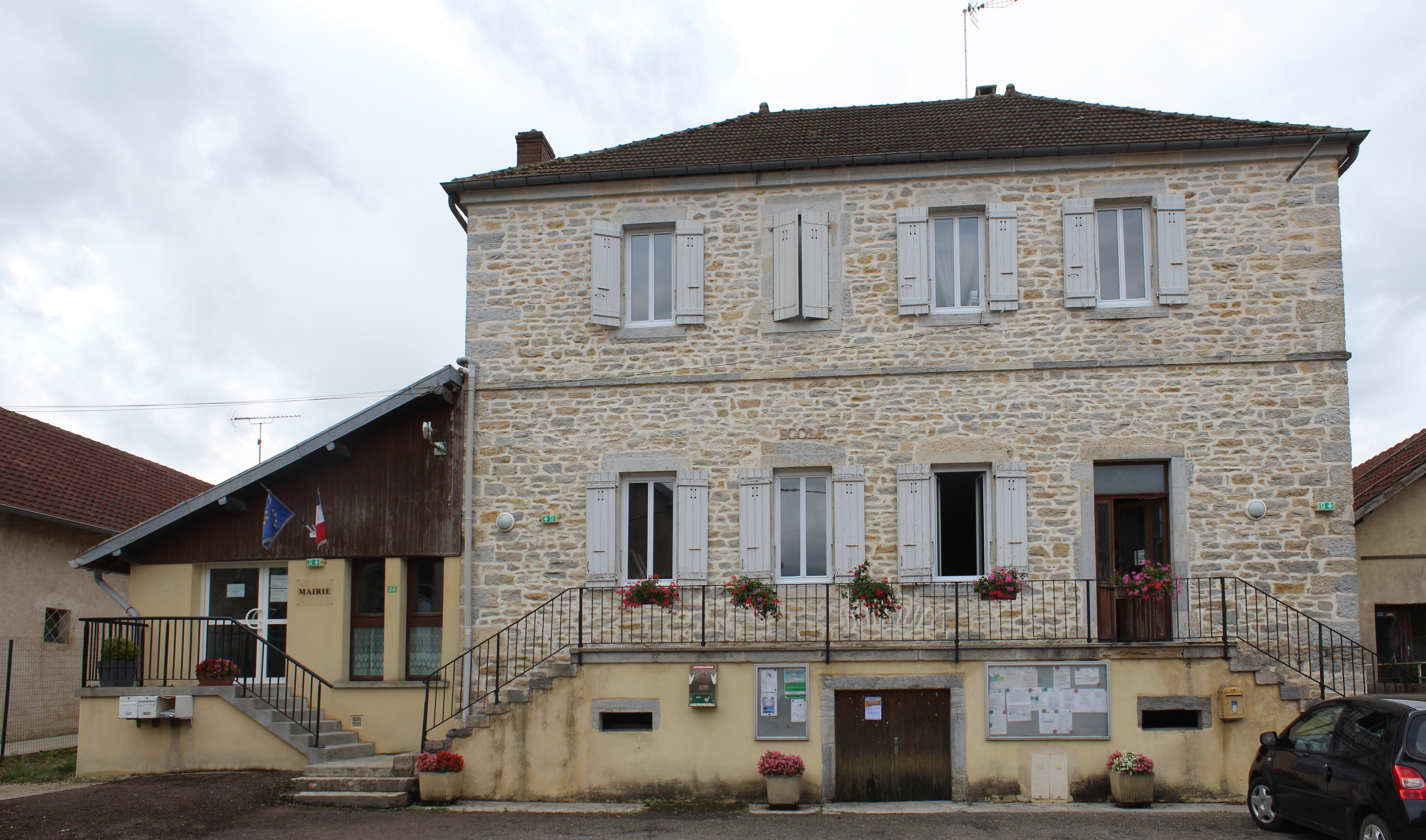
- The town hall in Séligney
- Location of Séligney
- Location within France Location within Bourgogne-Franche-Comté
- Coordinates: 46°56′20″N 5°32′24″E
- Country: France
- Region: Bourgogne-Franche-Comté
- Department: Jura
- Arrondissement: Dole
- Canton: Tavaux
- Intercommunality: Plaine Jurassienne

Government
  - Mayor (2020–2026): Jean-Marie Gaire
- Area^{1}: 4.15 km^{2} (1.60 sq mi)
- Highest elevation: 241 m (791 ft)
- Lowest elevation: 209 m (686 ft)
- Population (2023): 77
  - Density: 19/km^{2} (48/sq mi)
- Time zone: UTC+01:00 (CET)
  - Summer (DST): UTC+02:00 (CEST)
- INSEE/Postal code: 39507 /39120
- ^{1} French Land Register data, which excludes lakes, ponds, glaciers > 1 km^{2} (0.386 sq mi or 247 acres) and river estuaries.

Séligney (French pronunciation: [seliɲɛ]) is a commune in the Jura department and Bourgogne-Franche-Comté region of eastern France.

== Population ==
Historical population
Year	Pop.	±% p.a.
1968	102	—
1975	99	−0.43%
1982	119	+2.66%
1990	120	+0.10%
1999	111	−0.86%
2007	87	−3.00%
2012	83	−0.94%
2017	77	−1.49%
2023	77	+0.00%
Source: INSEE

== See also ==
- Communes of the Jura department
