= Asnans-Beauvoisin =

Commune in Bourgogne-Franche-Comté, France

- Commune
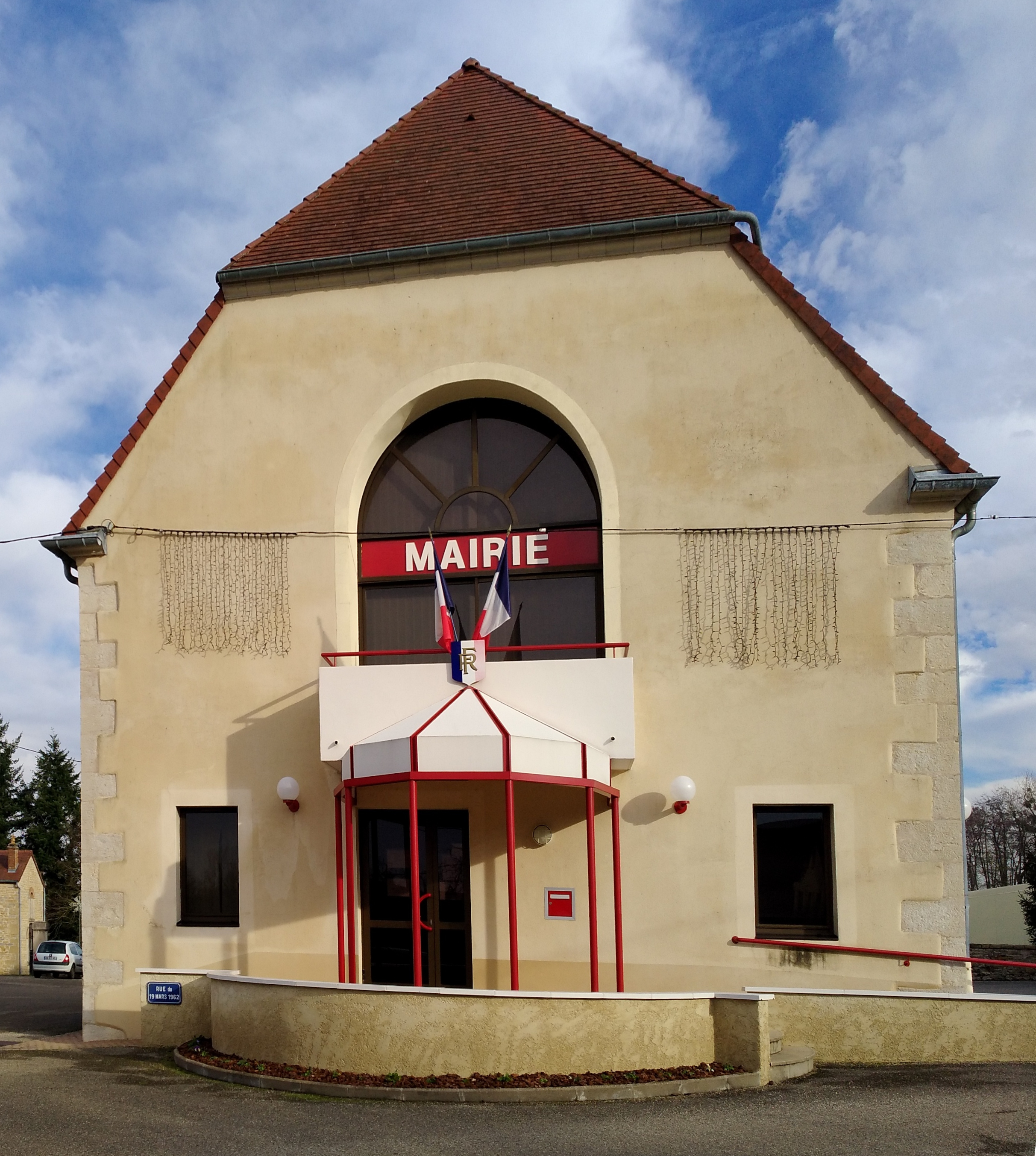
- The town hall in Asnans-Beauvoisin

- Coat of arms
- Location of Asnans-Beauvoisin
- Location within France Location within Bourgogne-Franche-Comté
- Coordinates: 46°56′51″N 5°24′45″E
- Country: France
- Region: Bourgogne-Franche-Comté
- Department: Jura
- Arrondissement: Dole
- Canton: Tavaux
- Intercommunality: CC Plaine Jurassienne

Government
  - Mayor (2020–2026): Éric Fluchon
- Area^{1}: 16.24 km^{2} (6.27 sq mi)
- Highest elevation: 220 m (720 ft)
- Lowest elevation: 183 m (600 ft)
- Population (2023): 713
  - Density: 43.9/km^{2} (114/sq mi)
- Time zone: UTC+01:00 (CET)
  - Summer (DST): UTC+02:00 (CEST)
- INSEE/Postal code: 39022 /39120
- ^{1} French Land Register data, which excludes lakes, ponds, glaciers > 1 km^{2} (0.386 sq mi or 247 acres) and river estuaries.

Asnans-Beauvoisin (French pronunciation: [anɑ̃ bovwazɛ̃]) is a commune in the Jura department in region of Bourgogne-Franche-Comté in eastern France. It was created in 1974 by the merger of two former communes: Beauvoisin and Asnans.

== Population ==
Historical population
Year	Pop.	±% p.a.
1968	613	—
1975	558	−1.33%
1982	600	+1.04%
1990	581	−0.40%
1999	540	−0.81%
2007	673	+2.79%
2012	706	+0.96%
2017	731	+0.70%
2023	713	−0.41%
Source: INSEE

== See also ==
- Communes of the Jura department
