= Abergement =

Abergement may refer to:

== Places ==
- Abergement-la-Ronce, a commune in the Jura department in the region of Bourgogne-Franche-Comté in eastern France
- Abergement-le-Grand, a commune in the Jura department in the region of Bourgogne-Franche-Comté in eastern France
- Abergement-le-Petit, a commune in the Jura department in the region of Bourgogne-Franche-Comté in eastern France
- Abergement-lès-Thésy, a commune in the Jura department in the region of Bourgogne-Franche-Comté in eastern France
- Le Grand-Abergement, a former commune in the Ain department in eastern France
- Le Petit-Abergement, a former commune in the Ain department in eastern France
- Neublans-Abergement, a commune in the Jura department in Bourgogne-Franche-Comté in eastern France
