= Aresches =

Commune in Bourgogne-Franche-Comté, France

- Commune
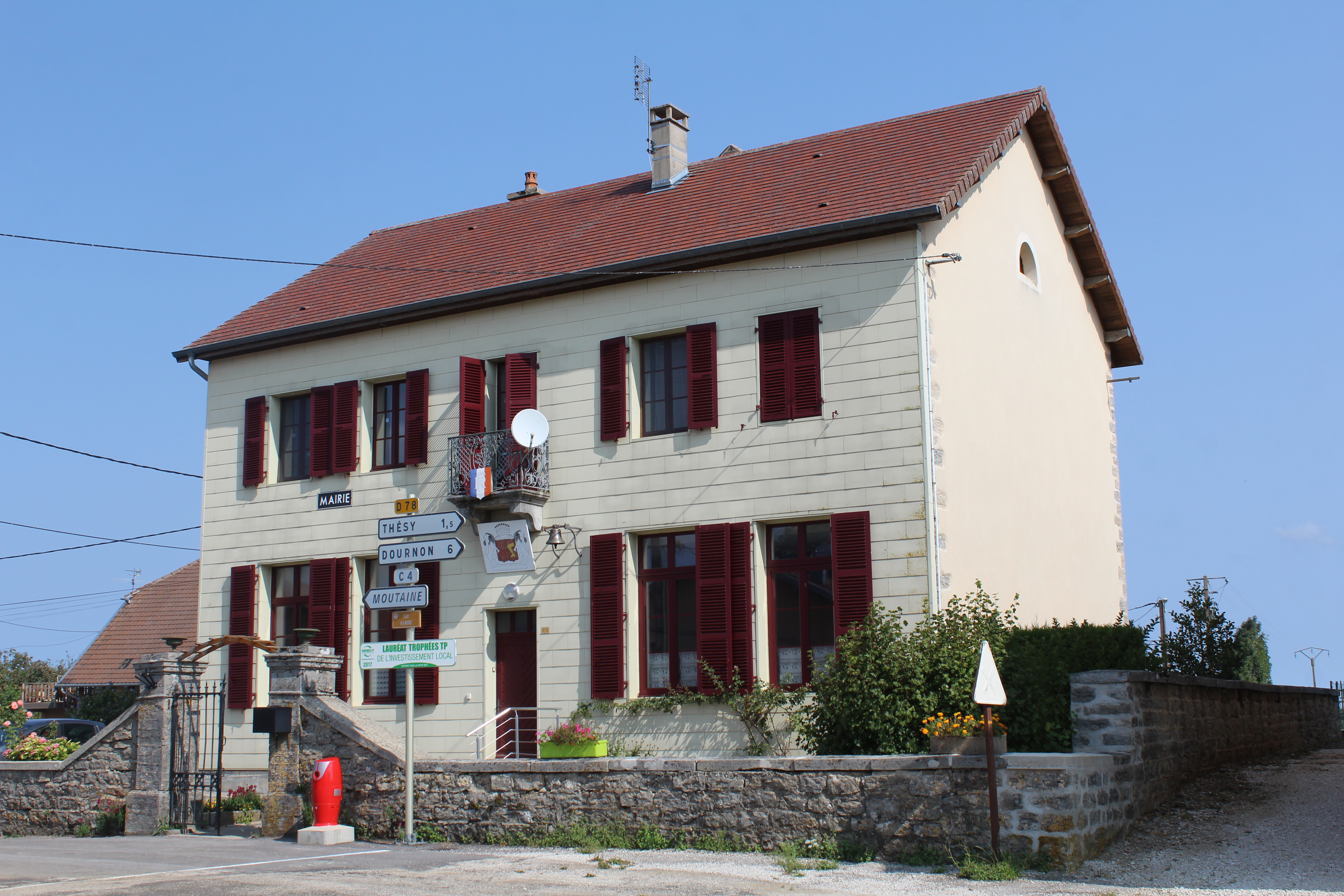
- The town hall in Aresches

- Coat of arms
- Location of Aresches
- Location within France Location within Bourgogne-Franche-Comté
- Coordinates: 46°54′09″N 5°54′39″E
- Country: France
- Region: Bourgogne-Franche-Comté
- Department: Jura
- Arrondissement: Dole
- Canton: Arbois

Government
  - Mayor (2020–2026): Stéphane Henard
- Area^{1}: 4.76 km^{2} (1.84 sq mi)
- Highest elevation: 736 m (2,415 ft)
- Lowest elevation: 570 m (1,870 ft)
- Population (2023): 27
  - Density: 5.7/km^{2} (15/sq mi)
- Time zone: UTC+01:00 (CET)
  - Summer (DST): UTC+02:00 (CEST)
- INSEE/Postal code: 39586 /39110
- ^{1} French Land Register data, which excludes lakes, ponds, glaciers > 1 km^{2} (0.386 sq mi or 247 acres) and river estuaries.

Aresches (French pronunciation: [aʁɛʃ]) is a commune in the Jura department in the region of Bourgogne-Franche-Comté in eastern France. It was merged with Moutaine in 1826, and it was re-established in 1950.

== Population ==
Historical population
Year	Pop.	±% p.a.
1968	52	—
1975	41	−3.34%
1982	44	+1.01%
1990	51	+1.86%
1999	50	−0.22%
2007	44	−1.59%
2012	39	−2.38%
2017	32	−3.88%
2023	27	−2.79%
Source: INSEE

== See also ==
- Communes of the Jura department
