= Clucy =

Commune in Bourgogne-Franche-Comté, France

- Commune
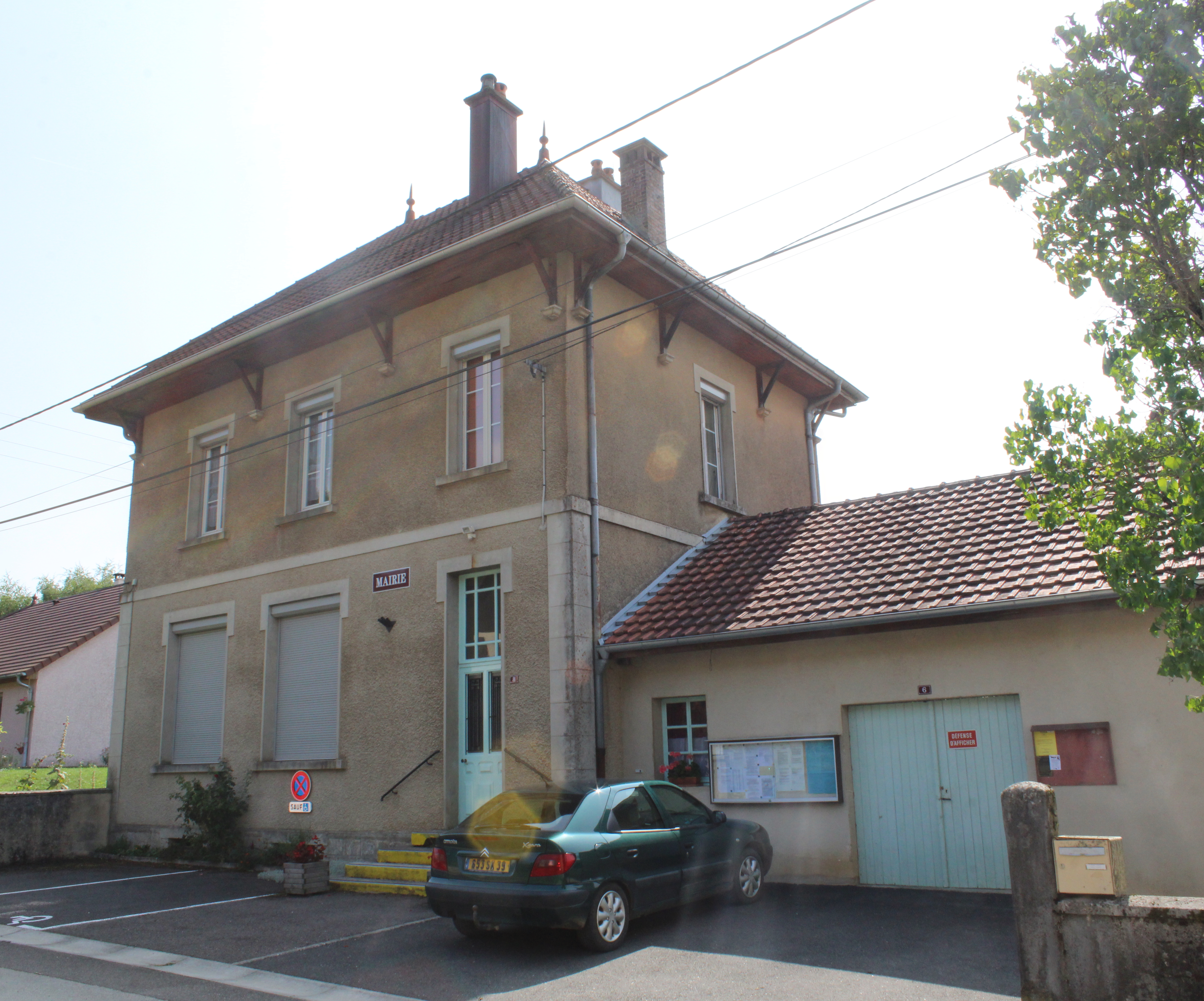
- The town hall in Clucy
- Location of Clucy
- Location within France Location within Bourgogne-Franche-Comté
- Coordinates: 46°56′50″N 5°54′16″E
- Country: France
- Region: Bourgogne-Franche-Comté
- Department: Jura
- Arrondissement: Dole
- Canton: Arbois

Government
  - Mayor (2020–2026): Claude Berthod
- Area^{1}: 5.13 km^{2} (1.98 sq mi)
- Highest elevation: 719 m (2,359 ft)
- Lowest elevation: 560 m (1,840 ft)
- Population (2023): 67
  - Density: 13/km^{2} (34/sq mi)
- Time zone: UTC+01:00 (CET)
  - Summer (DST): UTC+02:00 (CEST)
- INSEE/Postal code: 39155 /39110
- ^{1} French Land Register data, which excludes lakes, ponds, glaciers > 1 km^{2} (0.386 sq mi or 247 acres) and river estuaries.

Clucy (French pronunciation: [klysi]; Arpitan: Kieussy) is a commune in the Jura department in Bourgogne-Franche-Comté in eastern France.

== Population ==
Historical population
| Year | Pop. | ±% p.a. |
|---|---|---|
| 1968 | 87 | — |
| 1975 | 82 | −0.84% |
| 1982 | 80 | −0.35% |
| 1990 | 88 | +1.20% |
| 1999 | 72 | −2.21% |
| 2007 | 72 | +0.00% |
| 2012 | 84 | +3.13% |
| 2017 | 78 | −1.47% |
| 2023 | 67 | −2.50% |
Source: INSEE

== See also ==
- Communes of the Jura department
