= Mathenay =

Commune in Bourgogne-Franche-Comté, France

- Commune
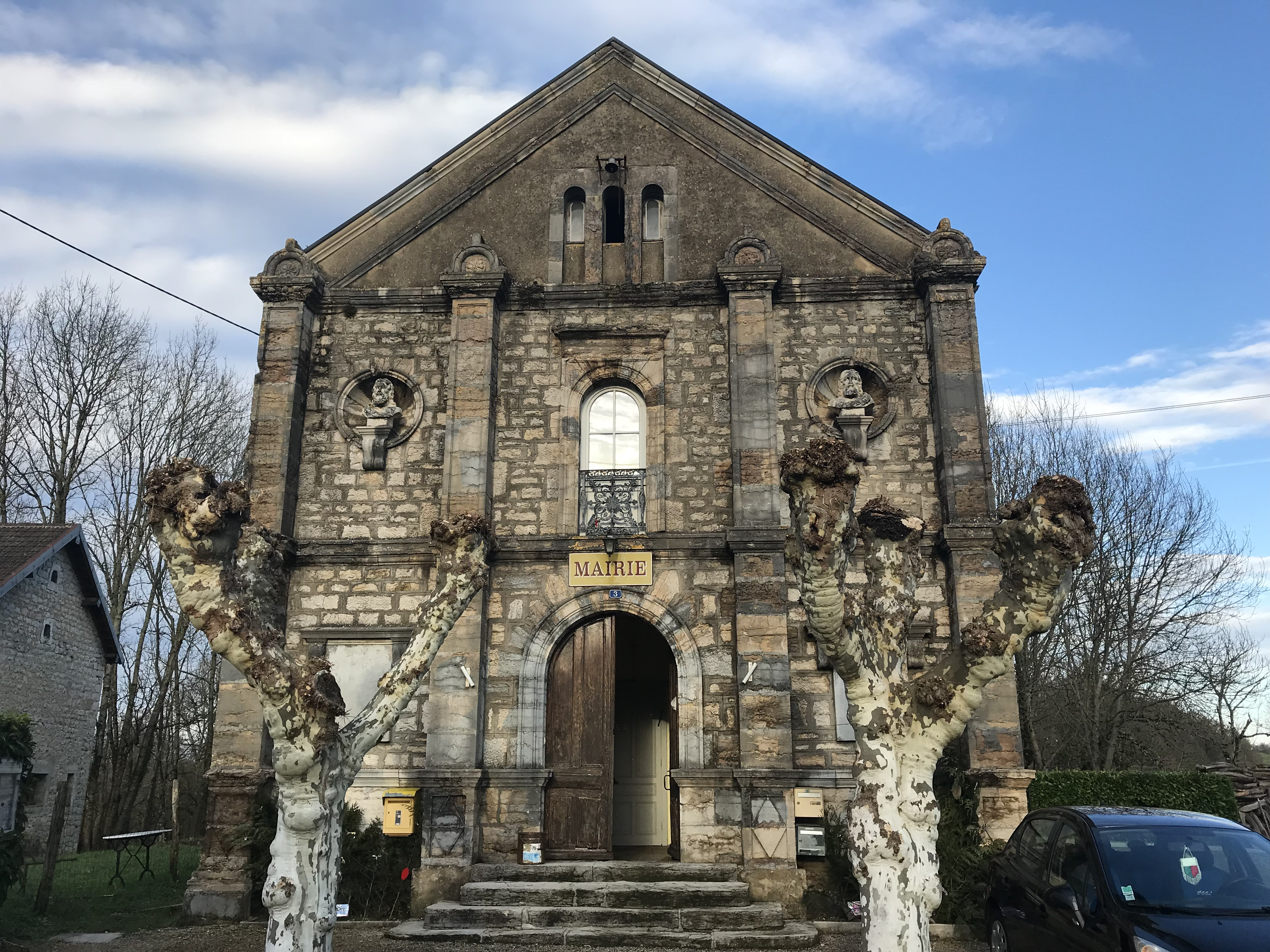
- The town hall in Mathenay
- Location of Mathenay
- Location within France Location within Bourgogne-Franche-Comté
- Coordinates: 46°55′59″N 5°40′42″E
- Country: France
- Region: Bourgogne-Franche-Comté
- Department: Jura
- Arrondissement: Dole
- Canton: Arbois

Government
  - Mayor (2020–2026): Laëtitia Dos Santos
- Area^{1}: 3.54 km^{2} (1.37 sq mi)
- Highest elevation: 295 m (968 ft)
- Lowest elevation: 231 m (758 ft)
- Population (2023): 148
  - Density: 41.8/km^{2} (108/sq mi)
- Time zone: UTC+01:00 (CET)
  - Summer (DST): UTC+02:00 (CEST)
- INSEE/Postal code: 39319 /39600
- ^{1} French Land Register data, which excludes lakes, ponds, glaciers > 1 km^{2} (0.386 sq mi or 247 acres) and river estuaries.

Mathenay is a commune in the Jura department in Bourgogne-Franche-Comté in eastern France.

== Population ==
Historical population
Year	Pop.	±% p.a.
1968	79	—
1975	80	+0.18%
1982	85	+0.87%
1990	77	−1.23%
1999	93	+2.12%
2007	113	+2.46%
2012	140	+4.38%
2017	143	+0.42%
2023	148	+0.57%
Source: INSEE

== See also ==
- Communes of the Jura department
