= Dournon =

Commune in Bourgogne-Franche-Comté, France

- Commune
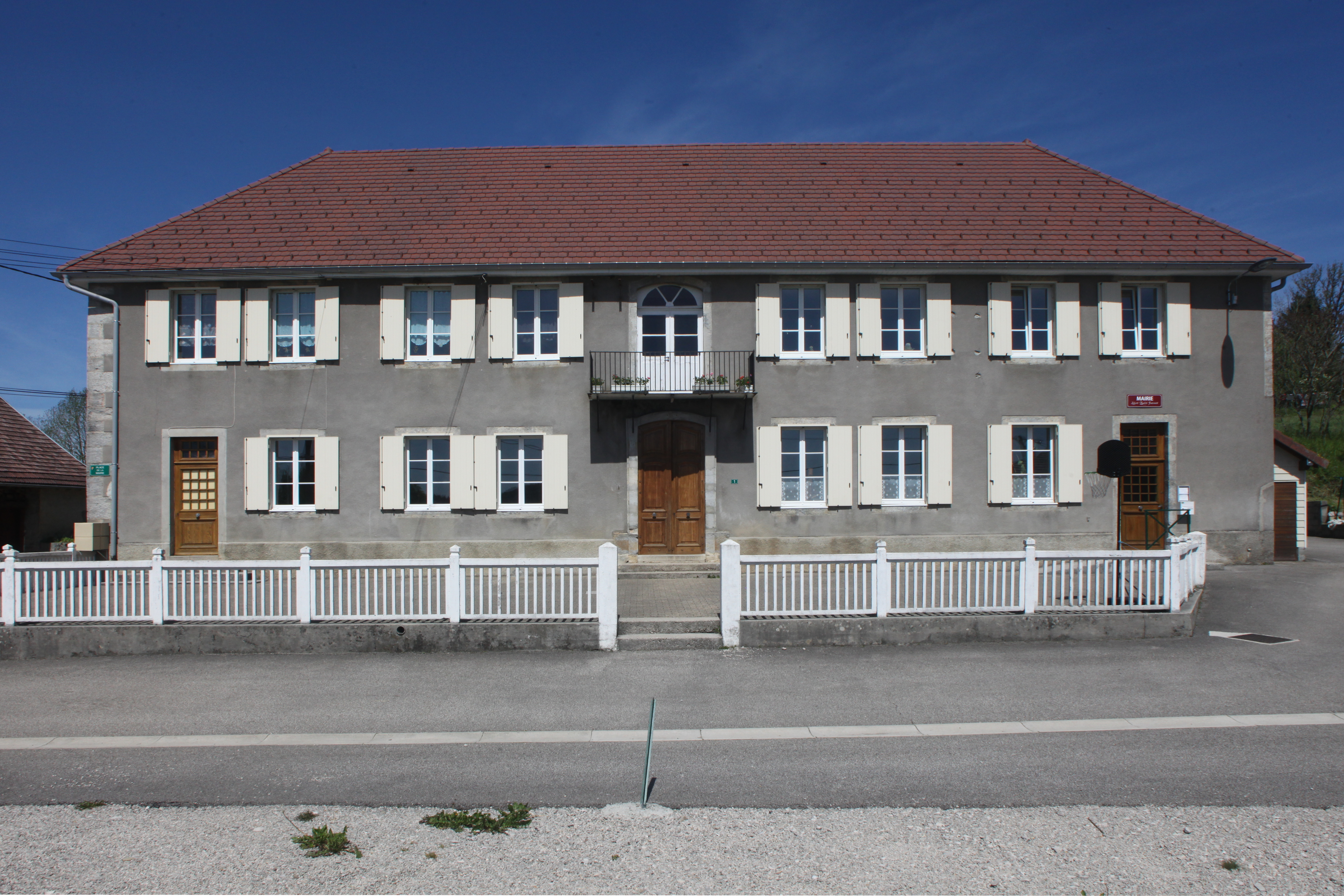
- The town hall in Dournon

- Coat of arms
- Location of Dournon
- Location within France Location within Bourgogne-Franche-Comté
- Coordinates: 46°56′00″N 5°57′58″E
- Country: France
- Region: Bourgogne-Franche-Comté
- Department: Jura
- Arrondissement: Dole
- Canton: Arbois

Government
  - Mayor (2020–2026): William Gavat
- Area^{1}: 6.55 km^{2} (2.53 sq mi)
- Highest elevation: 719 m (2,359 ft)
- Lowest elevation: 593 m (1,946 ft)
- Population (2023): 142
  - Density: 21.7/km^{2} (56.1/sq mi)
- Time zone: UTC+01:00 (CET)
  - Summer (DST): UTC+02:00 (CEST)
- INSEE/Postal code: 39202 /39110
- ^{1} French Land Register data, which excludes lakes, ponds, glaciers > 1 km^{2} (0.386 sq mi or 247 acres) and river estuaries.

Dournon (French pronunciation: [duʁnɔ̃]; Arpitan: Dounon) is a commune in the Jura department in Bourgogne-Franche-Comté in eastern France.

== Population ==
Historical population
Year	Pop.	±% p.a.
1968	100	—
1975	85	−2.29%
1982	113	+4.15%
1990	122	+0.96%
1999	102	−1.97%
2007	118	+1.84%
2012	129	+1.80%
2017	140	+1.65%
2023	142	+0.24%
Source: INSEE

== See also ==
- Communes of the Jura department
