= Villette-lès-Arbois =

- Commune
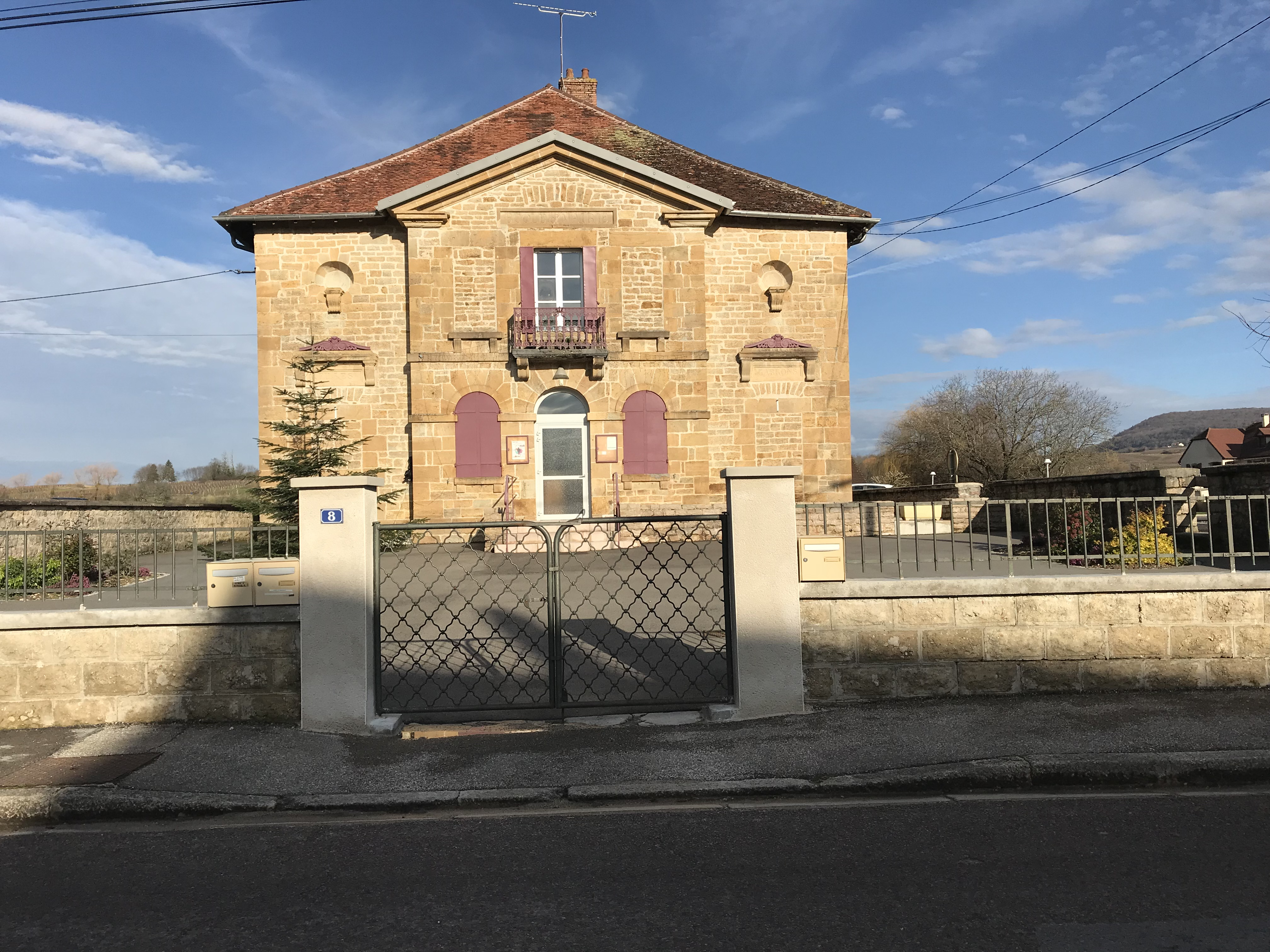
- The town hall in Villette-lès-Arbois
- Location of Villette-lès-Arbois
- Location within France Location within Bourgogne-Franche-Comté
- Coordinates: 46°55′21″N 5°45′13″E
- Country: France
- Region: Bourgogne-Franche-Comté
- Department: Jura
- Arrondissement: Dole
- Canton: Arbois

Government
  - Mayor (2020–2026): Bernard Oncle
- Area^{1}: 5.45 km^{2} (2.10 sq mi)
- Highest elevation: 338 m (1,109 ft)
- Lowest elevation: 248 m (814 ft)
- Population (2023): 352
  - Density: 64.6/km^{2} (167/sq mi)
- Time zone: UTC+01:00 (CET)
  - Summer (DST): UTC+02:00 (CEST)
- INSEE/Postal code: 39572 /39600
- ^{1} French Land Register data, which excludes lakes, ponds, glaciers > 1 km^{2} (0.386 sq mi or 247 acres) and river estuaries.

Villette-lès-Arbois (French pronunciation: [vilɛt lɛ.z‿aʁbwa], literally Villette near Arbois; Arpitan: Veleta) is a commune in the Jura department in the Bourgogne-Franche-Comté region in eastern France.

== Population ==
Historical population
Year	Pop.	±% p.a.
1968	196	—
1975	240	+2.94%
1982	282	+2.33%
1990	309	+1.15%
1999	304	−0.18%
2007	387	+3.06%
2012	386	−0.05%
2017	386	+0.00%
2023	352	−1.53%
Source: INSEE

== See also ==
- Communes of the Jura department
