= La Ferté, Jura =

Commune in Bourgogne-Franche-Comté, France

La Ferté
- Commune
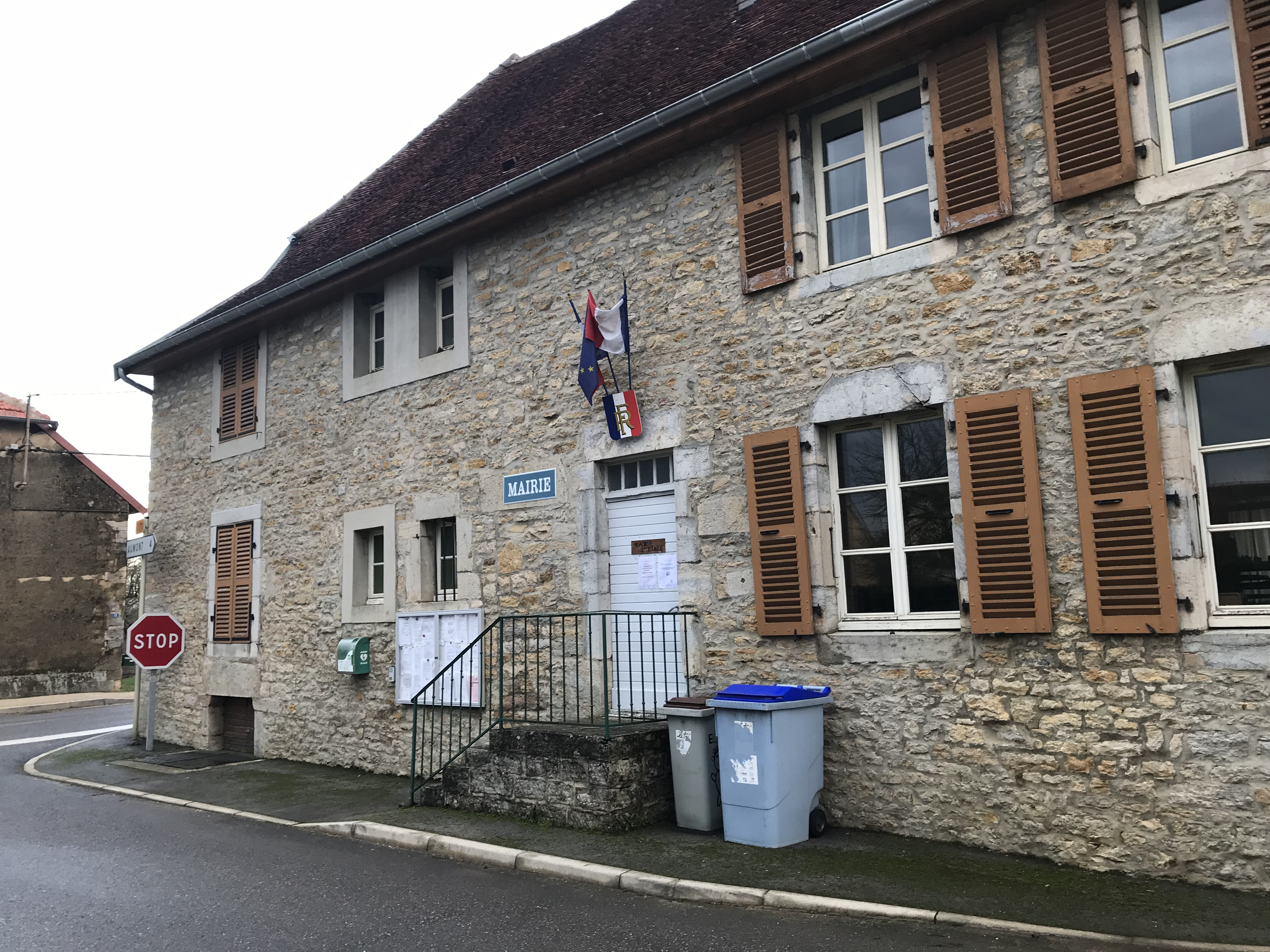
- The town hall in La Ferté
- Location of La Ferté
- Location within France Location within Bourgogne-Franche-Comté
- Coordinates: 46°56′34″N 5°39′36″E
- Country: France
- Region: Bourgogne-Franche-Comté
- Department: Jura
- Arrondissement: Dole
- Canton: Arbois

Government
  - Mayor (2020–2026): Bruno Petitjean
- Area^{1}: 11.75 km^{2} (4.54 sq mi)
- Highest elevation: 288 m (945 ft)
- Lowest elevation: 220 m (720 ft)
- Population (2023): 182
  - Density: 15.5/km^{2} (40.1/sq mi)
- Time zone: UTC+01:00 (CET)
  - Summer (DST): UTC+02:00 (CEST)
- INSEE/Postal code: 39223 /39600
- ^{1} French Land Register data, which excludes lakes, ponds, glaciers > 1 km^{2} (0.386 sq mi or 247 acres) and river estuaries.

La Ferté (French pronunciation: [la fɛʁte]) is a commune in the Jura department in Bourgogne-Franche-Comté in eastern France.

== Population ==
Historical population
Year	Pop.	±% p.a.
1968	188	—
1975	167	−1.68%
1982	185	+1.47%
1990	181	−0.27%
1999	191	+0.60%
2007	187	−0.26%
2012	193	+0.63%
2017	198	+0.51%
2023	182	−1.39%
Source: INSEE

== See also ==
- Communes of the Jura department
