= Saizenay =

Commune in Bourgogne-Franche-Comté, France

- Commune
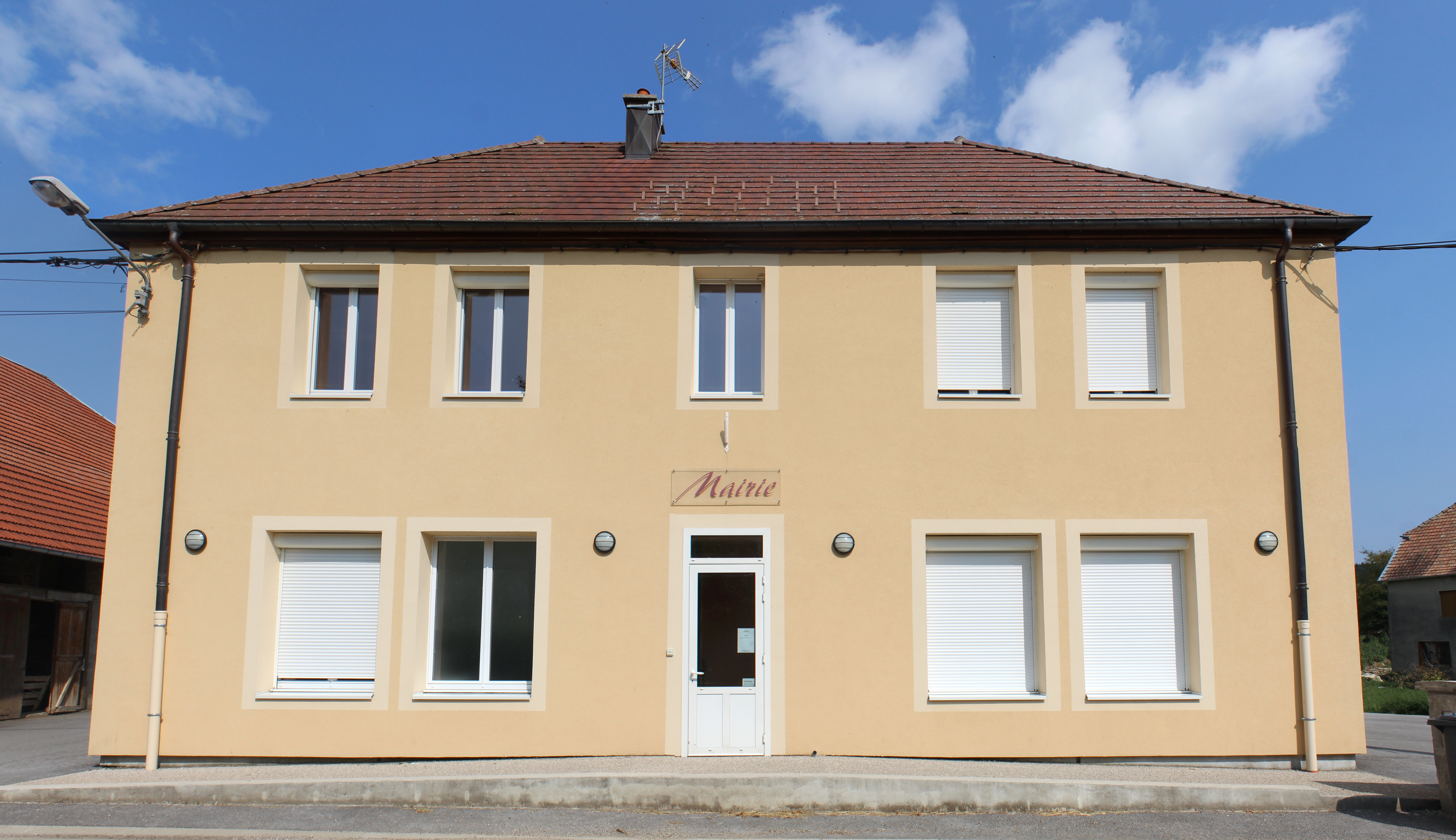
- The town hall in Saizenay
- Location of Saizenay
- Location within France Location within Bourgogne-Franche-Comté
- Coordinates: 46°57′45″N 5°54′57″E
- Country: France
- Region: Bourgogne-Franche-Comté
- Department: Jura
- Arrondissement: Dole
- Canton: Arbois

Government
  - Mayor (2020–2026): René Bernard
- Area^{1}: 4.88 km^{2} (1.88 sq mi)
- Highest elevation: 737 m (2,418 ft)
- Lowest elevation: 498 m (1,634 ft)
- Population (2023): 101
  - Density: 20.7/km^{2} (53.6/sq mi)
- Time zone: UTC+01:00 (CET)
  - Summer (DST): UTC+02:00 (CEST)
- INSEE/Postal code: 39497 /39110
- ^{1} French Land Register data, which excludes lakes, ponds, glaciers > 1 km^{2} (0.386 sq mi or 247 acres) and river estuaries.

Saizenay (French pronunciation: [sɛznɛ]) is a commune in the Jura department in the Bourgogne-Franche-Comté region in eastern France.

== Population ==
Historical population
| Year | Pop. | ±% p.a. |
|---|---|---|
| 1968 | 121 | — |
| 1975 | 111 | −1.22% |
| 1982 | 119 | +1.00% |
| 1990 | 112 | −0.75% |
| 1999 | 119 | +0.68% |
| 2007 | 110 | −0.98% |
| 2012 | 105 | −0.93% |
| 2017 | 95 | −1.98% |
| 2023 | 101 | +1.03% |
Source: INSEE

== See also ==
- Communes of the Jura department
