= Cernans =

Commune in Bourgogne-Franche-Comté, France

- Commune
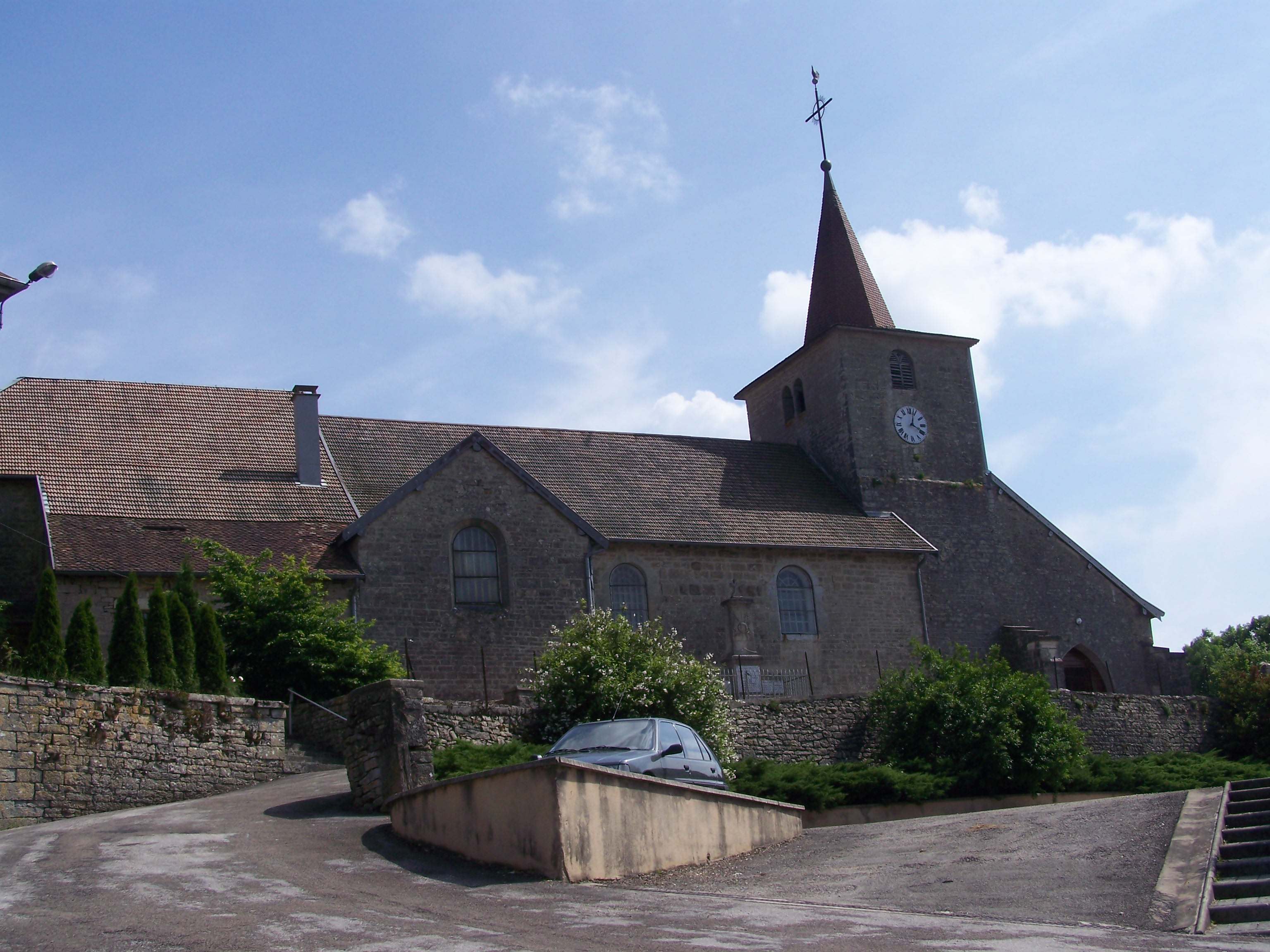
- The church in Cernans
- Location of Cernans
- Location within France Location within Bourgogne-Franche-Comté
- Coordinates: 46°55′58″N 5°55′57″E
- Country: France
- Region: Bourgogne-Franche-Comté
- Department: Jura
- Arrondissement: Dole
- Canton: Arbois

Government
  - Mayor (2020–2026): Denis Morel
- Area^{1}: 5.51 km^{2} (2.13 sq mi)
- Highest elevation: 724 m (2,375 ft)
- Lowest elevation: 612 m (2,008 ft)
- Population (2023): 147
  - Density: 26.7/km^{2} (69.1/sq mi)
- Time zone: UTC+01:00 (CET)
  - Summer (DST): UTC+02:00 (CEST)
- INSEE/Postal code: 39084 /39110
- ^{1} French Land Register data, which excludes lakes, ponds, glaciers > 1 km^{2} (0.386 sq mi or 247 acres) and river estuaries.

Cernans (French pronunciation: [sɛʁnɑ̃]) is a commune in the Jura department in Bourgogne-Franche-Comté in eastern France.

== Population ==
Historical population
Year	Pop.	±% p.a.
1968	141	—
1975	137	−0.41%
1982	123	−1.53%
1990	104	−2.08%
1999	98	−0.66%
2007	135	+4.09%
2012	139	+0.59%
2017	140	+0.14%
2023	147	+0.82%
Source: INSEE

== See also ==
- Communes of the Jura department
