= Chilly-sur-Salins =

Commune in Bourgogne-Franche-Comté, France

- Commune
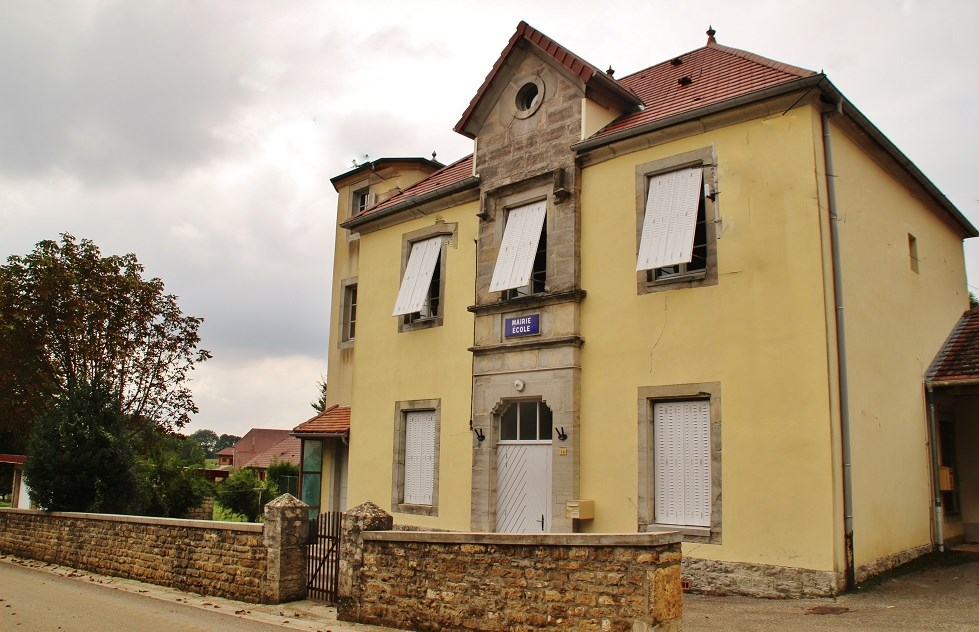
- The town hall in Chilly-sur-Salins
- Location of Chilly-sur-Salins
- Location within France Location within Bourgogne-Franche-Comté
- Coordinates: 46°53′27″N 5°52′05″E
- Country: France
- Region: Bourgogne-Franche-Comté
- Department: Jura
- Arrondissement: Dole
- Canton: Arbois

Government
  - Mayor (2020–2026): Hervé Rigaud
- Area^{1}: 11.94 km^{2} (4.61 sq mi)
- Highest elevation: 695 m (2,280 ft)
- Lowest elevation: 573 m (1,880 ft)
- Population (2023): 95
  - Density: 8.0/km^{2} (21/sq mi)
- Time zone: UTC+01:00 (CET)
  - Summer (DST): UTC+02:00 (CEST)
- INSEE/Postal code: 39147 /39110
- ^{1} French Land Register data, which excludes lakes, ponds, glaciers > 1 km^{2} (0.386 sq mi or 247 acres) and river estuaries.

Chilly-sur-Salins is a commune in the Jura department in Bourgogne-Franche-Comté in eastern France.

== Population ==
Historical population
Year	Pop.	±% p.a.
1968	134	—
1975	121	−1.45%
1982	107	−1.74%
1990	97	−1.22%
1999	92	−0.59%
2007	108	+2.02%
2012	88	−4.01%
2017	114	+5.31%
2023	95	−2.99%
Source: INSEE

== See also ==
- Communes of the Jura department
