= Abergement-lès-Thésy =

Commune in Bourgogne-Franche-Comté, France

- Commune
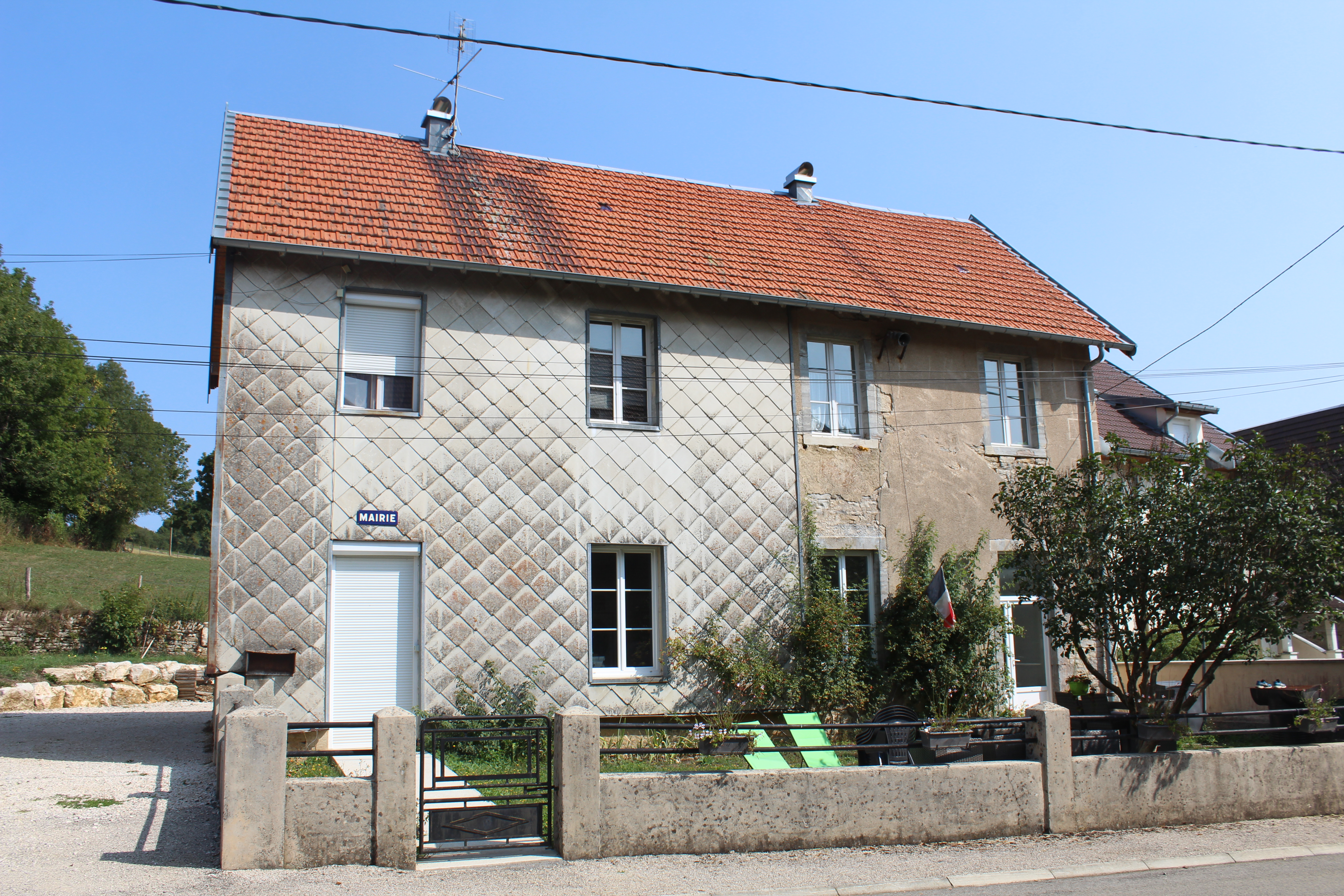
- The town hall in Abergement-lès-Thésy
- Location of Abergement-lès-Thésy
- Location within France Location within Bourgogne-Franche-Comté
- Coordinates: 46°55′05″N 5°56′26″E
- Country: France
- Region: Bourgogne-Franche-Comté
- Department: Jura
- Arrondissement: Lons-le-Saunier
- Canton: Arbois
- Intercommunality: Arbois, Poligny, Salins – Cœur du Jura

Government
  - Mayor (2020–2026): Rémy Viennet
- Area^{1}: 4.63 km^{2} (1.79 sq mi)
- Highest elevation: 732 m (2,402 ft)
- Lowest elevation: 619 m (2,031 ft)
- Population (2023): 46
  - Density: 9.9/km^{2} (26/sq mi)
- Time zone: UTC+01:00 (CET)
  - Summer (DST): UTC+02:00 (CEST)
- INSEE/Postal code: 39004 /39110
- ^{1} French Land Register data, which excludes lakes, ponds, glaciers > 1 km^{2} (0.386 sq mi or 247 acres) and river estuaries.

Abergement-lès-Thésy (French pronunciation: [abɛʁʒəmɑ̃ lɛ tezi], literally Abergement near Thésy; Arpitan: Ôbérdzoma) is a commune in the Jura department in the region of Bourgogne-Franche-Comté in eastern France.

== Population ==
Historical population

Year	Pop.	±% p.a.
1793	162	—
1821	158	−0.09%
1846	176	+0.43%
1872	121	−1.43%
1901	85	−1.21%
1926	99	+0.61%
1946	62	−2.31%
1962	63	+0.10%
1968	63	+0.00%

Year	Pop.	±% p.a.
1975	64	+0.23%
1982	58	−1.40%
1990	52	−1.36%
1999	53	+0.21%
2007	60	+1.56%
2012	66	+1.92%
2017	60	−1.89%
2023	46	−4.33%

Source: EHESS (1793-1999) and INSEE

== See also ==
- Communes of the Jura department
