= Montmarlon =

Commune in Bourgogne-Franche-Comté, France

- Commune
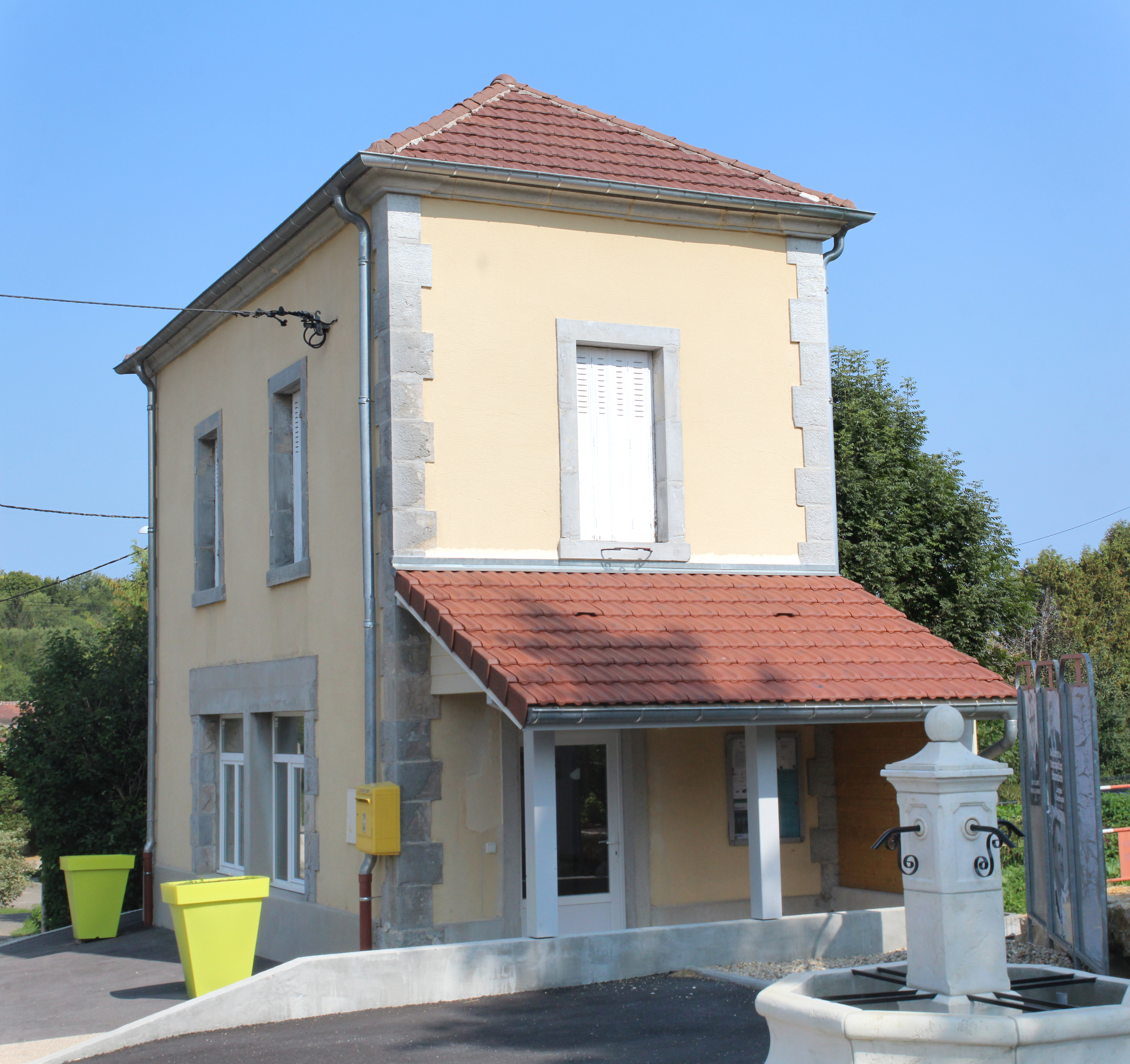
- The town hall in Montmarlon
- Location of Montmarlon
- Location within France Location within Bourgogne-Franche-Comté
- Coordinates: 46°52′34″N 5°57′50″E
- Country: France
- Region: Bourgogne-Franche-Comté
- Department: Jura
- Arrondissement: Dole
- Canton: Arbois

Government
  - Mayor (2020–2026): Sylvain Bénétruy
- Area^{1}: 3.28 km^{2} (1.27 sq mi)
- Highest elevation: 741 m (2,431 ft)
- Lowest elevation: 630 m (2,070 ft)
- Population (2023): 33
  - Density: 10/km^{2} (26/sq mi)
- Time zone: UTC+01:00 (CET)
  - Summer (DST): UTC+02:00 (CEST)
- INSEE/Postal code: 39359 /39110
- ^{1} French Land Register data, which excludes lakes, ponds, glaciers > 1 km^{2} (0.386 sq mi or 247 acres) and river estuaries.

Montmarlon (French pronunciation: [mɔ̃maʁlɔ̃]) is a commune in the Jura department in Bourgogne-Franche-Comté in eastern France.

== See also ==
- Communes of the Jura department
