= Marnoz =

Commune in Bourgogne-Franche-Comté, France

- Commune
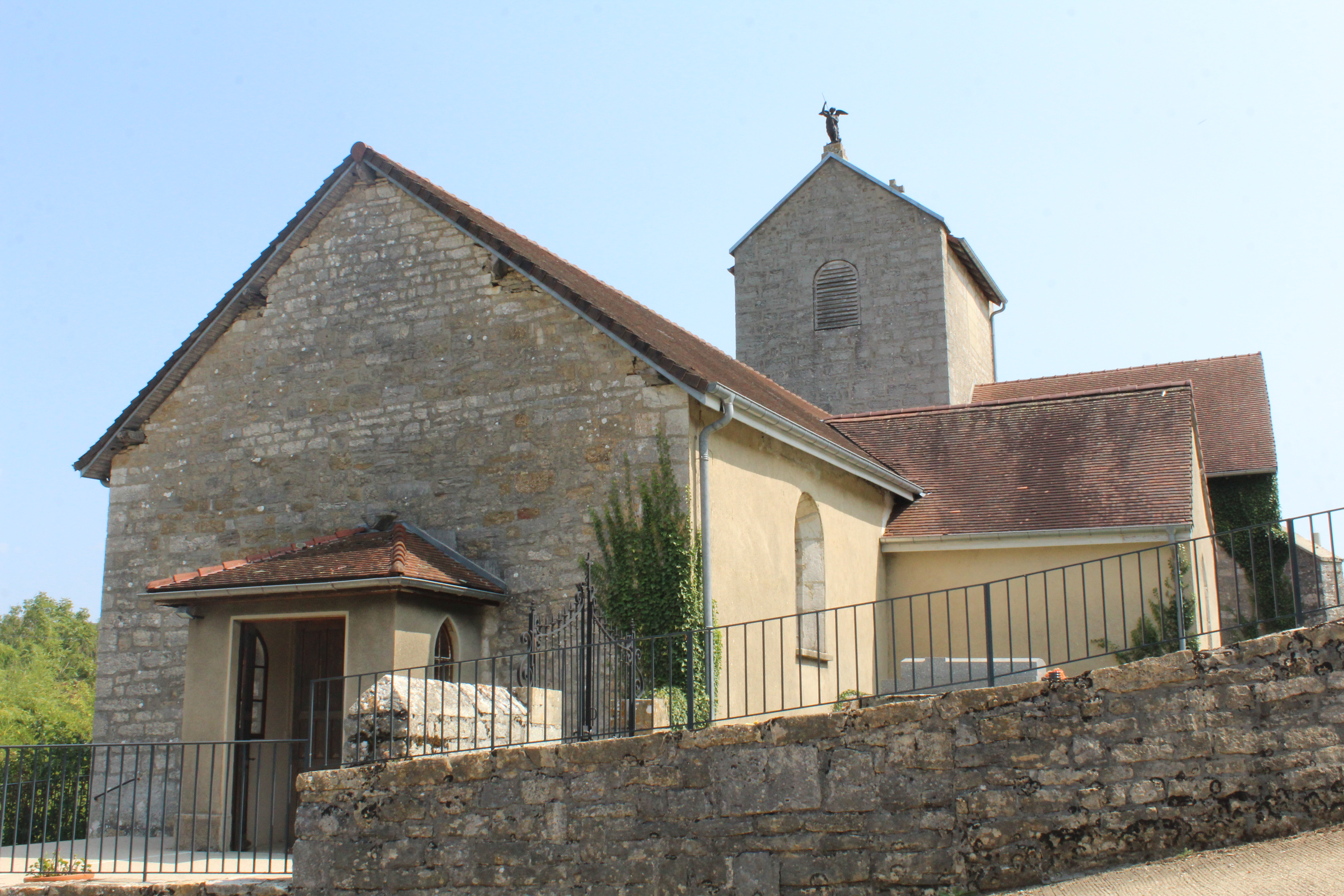
- The church in Marnoz
- Location of Marnoz
- Location within France Location within Bourgogne-Franche-Comté
- Coordinates: 46°57′03″N 5°49′59″E
- Country: France
- Region: Bourgogne-Franche-Comté
- Department: Jura
- Arrondissement: Dole
- Canton: Arbois

Government
  - Mayor (2020–2026): Alain Gavat
- Area^{1}: 4.87 km^{2} (1.88 sq mi)
- Highest elevation: 616 m (2,021 ft)
- Lowest elevation: 276 m (906 ft)
- Population (2023): 365
  - Density: 74.9/km^{2} (194/sq mi)
- Time zone: UTC+01:00 (CET)
  - Summer (DST): UTC+02:00 (CEST)
- INSEE/Postal code: 39315 /39110
- ^{1} French Land Register data, which excludes lakes, ponds, glaciers > 1 km^{2} (0.386 sq mi or 247 acres) and river estuaries.

Marnoz (French pronunciation: [maʁno]) is a commune in the Jura department in Bourgogne-Franche-Comté in eastern France.

== Population ==
Historical population
| Year | Pop. | ±% p.a. |
|---|---|---|
| 1968 | 261 | — |
| 1975 | 276 | +0.80% |
| 1982 | 330 | +2.59% |
| 1990 | 360 | +1.09% |
| 1999 | 320 | −1.30% |
| 2007 | 380 | +2.17% |
| 2012 | 411 | +1.58% |
| 2017 | 404 | −0.34% |
| 2023 | 365 | −1.68% |
Source: INSEE

== See also ==
- Communes of the Jura department
