= Canton of Arbois =

Coordinates: 46.90°N 5.77°E

The canton of Arbois is an administrative division of the Jura department, eastern France. Its borders were modified at the French canton reorganisation which came into effect in March 2015. Its seat is in Arbois.

It consists of the following communes:

1. Abergement-le-Grand
2. Abergement-lès-Thésy
3. Aiglepierre
4. Arbois
5. Aresches
6. Les Arsures
7. Bracon
8. Cernans
9. La Chapelle-sur-Furieuse
10. La Châtelaine
11. Chaux-Champagny
12. Chilly-sur-Salins
13. Clucy
14. Dournon
15. La Ferté
16. Geraise
17. Ivory
18. Ivrey
19. Lemuy
20. Marnoz
21. Mathenay
22. Mesnay
23. Molamboz
24. Montigny-lès-Arsures
25. Montmarlon
26. Les Planches-près-Arbois
27. Pont-d'Héry
28. Pretin
29. Pupillin
30. Saint-Cyr-Montmalin
31. Saint-Thiébaud
32. Saizenay
33. Salins-les-Bains
34. Thésy
35. Vadans
36. Villette-lès-Arbois
