= La Châtelaine =

Commune in Bourgogne-Franche-Comté, France

- Commune
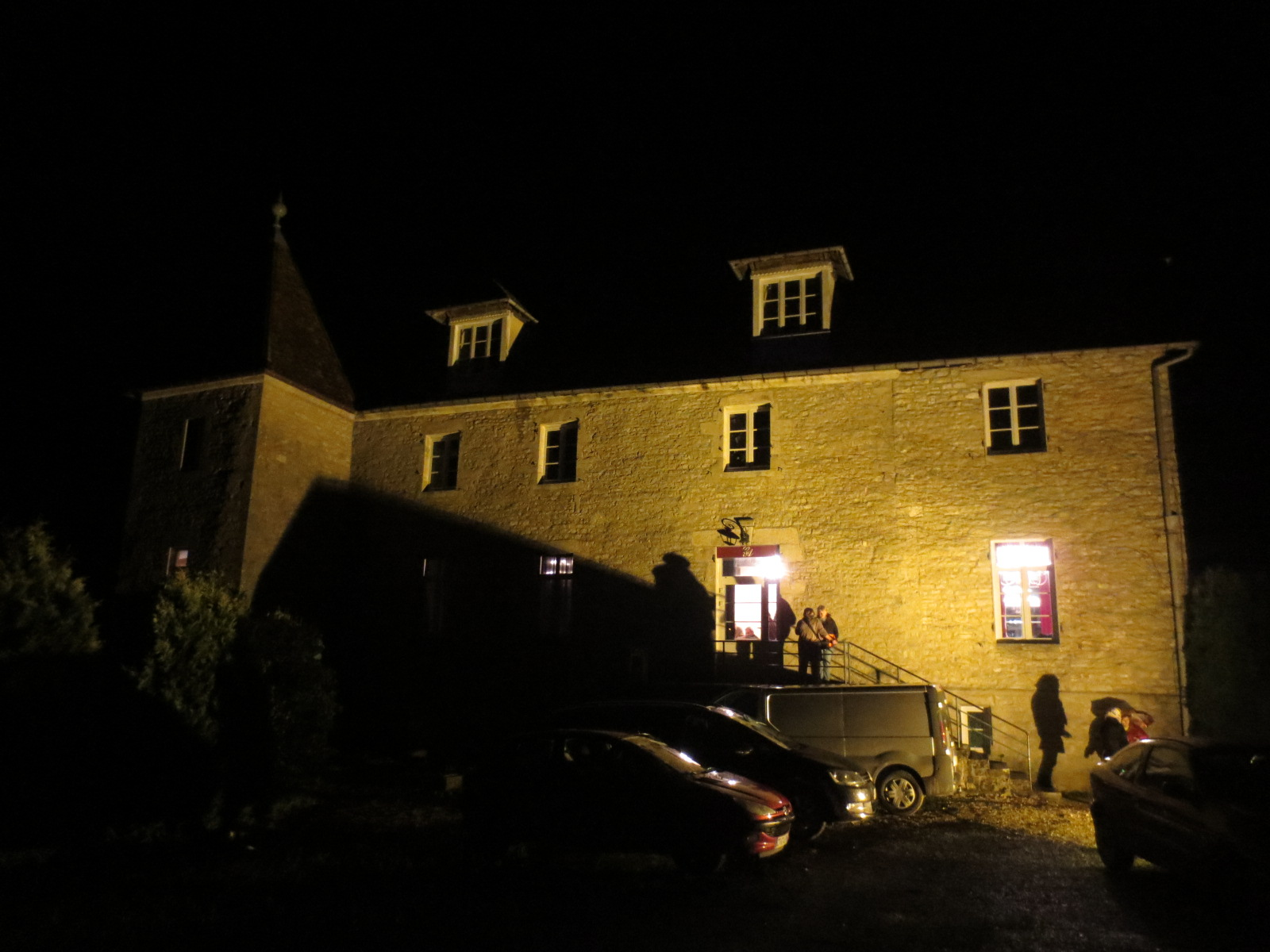
- Chateau of Artois
- Location of La Châtelaine
- Location within France Location within Bourgogne-Franche-Comté
- Coordinates: 46°52′32″N 5°49′09″E
- Country: France
- Region: Bourgogne-Franche-Comté
- Department: Jura
- Arrondissement: Dole
- Canton: Arbois

Government
  - Mayor (2021–2026): Pascal Leglise
- Area^{1}: 13.17 km^{2} (5.08 sq mi)
- Highest elevation: 633 m (2,077 ft)
- Lowest elevation: 470 m (1,540 ft)
- Population (2023): 151
  - Density: 11.5/km^{2} (29.7/sq mi)
- Time zone: UTC+01:00 (CET)
  - Summer (DST): UTC+02:00 (CEST)
- INSEE/Postal code: 39116 /39600
- ^{1} French Land Register data, which excludes lakes, ponds, glaciers > 1 km^{2} (0.386 sq mi or 247 acres) and river estuaries.

La Châtelaine (French pronunciation: [la ʃatlɛn]; Arpitan: La Tsaitelaina) is a commune in the Jura department in Bourgogne-Franche-Comté in eastern France.

== Population ==
Historical population
Year	Pop.	±% p.a.
1968	111	—
1975	108	−0.39%
1982	123	+1.88%
1990	120	−0.31%
1999	133	+1.15%
2007	134	+0.09%
2012	129	−0.76%
2017	139	+1.50%
2023	151	+1.39%
Source: INSEE

== See also ==
- Communes of the Jura department
