= Lemuy =

Commune in Bourgogne-Franche-Comté, France

- Commune
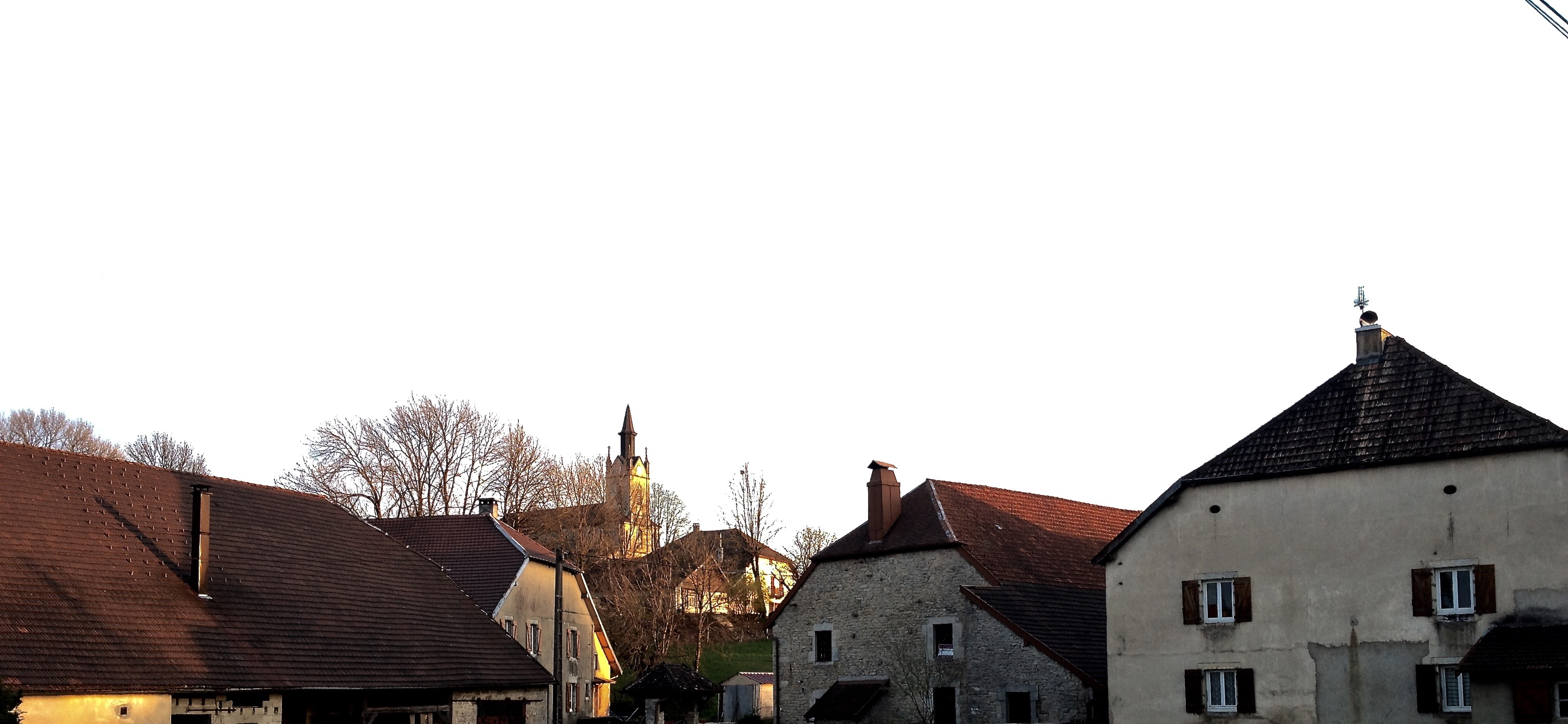
- The bell tower and surroundings in Lemuy
- Location of Lemuy
- Location within France Location within Bourgogne-Franche-Comté
- Coordinates: 46°53′54″N 5°58′09″E
- Country: France
- Region: Bourgogne-Franche-Comté
- Department: Jura
- Arrondissement: Dole
- Canton: Arbois

Government
  - Mayor (2020–2026): Damien Castella
- Area^{1}: 21.33 km^{2} (8.24 sq mi)
- Highest elevation: 884 m (2,900 ft)
- Lowest elevation: 608 m (1,995 ft)
- Population (2023): 255
  - Density: 12.0/km^{2} (31.0/sq mi)
- Time zone: UTC+01:00 (CET)
  - Summer (DST): UTC+02:00 (CEST)
- INSEE/Postal code: 39291 /39110
- ^{1} French Land Register data, which excludes lakes, ponds, glaciers > 1 km^{2} (0.386 sq mi or 247 acres) and river estuaries.

Lemuy (French pronunciation: [ləmɥi]; Arpitan: L'mu) is a commune in the Jura department in Bourgogne-Franche-Comté in eastern France.

== Population ==
Historical population
Year	Pop.	±% p.a.
1968	273	—
1975	294	+1.06%
1982	306	+0.57%
1990	291	−0.63%
1999	264	−1.08%
2007	245	−0.93%
2012	232	−1.08%
2017	238	+0.51%
2023	255	+1.16%
Source: INSEE

== See also ==
- Communes of the Jura department
