= Ivrey =

Commune in Bourgogne-Franche-Comté, France

- Commune
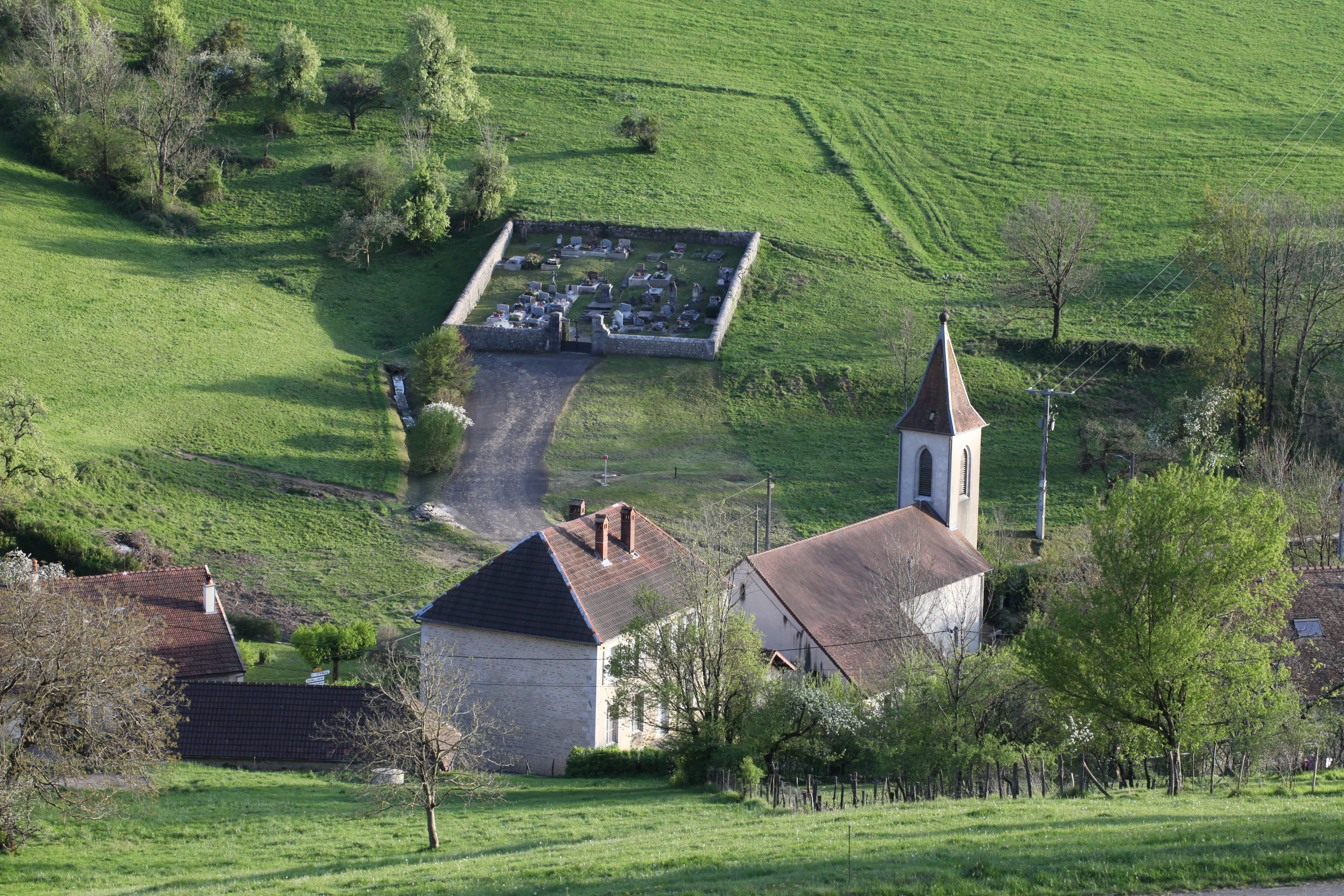
- The church and surroundings in Ivrey
- Location of Ivrey
- Location within France Location within Bourgogne-Franche-Comté
- Coordinates: 46°59′27″N 5°53′42″E
- Country: France
- Region: Bourgogne-Franche-Comté
- Department: Jura
- Arrondissement: Dole
- Canton: Arbois

Government
  - Mayor (2020–2026): Jean-François Cètre
- Area^{1}: 6.67 km^{2} (2.58 sq mi)
- Highest elevation: 810 m (2,660 ft)
- Lowest elevation: 319 m (1,047 ft)
- Population (2023): 63
  - Density: 9.4/km^{2} (24/sq mi)
- Time zone: UTC+01:00 (CET)
  - Summer (DST): UTC+02:00 (CEST)
- INSEE/Postal code: 39268 /39110
- ^{1} French Land Register data, which excludes lakes, ponds, glaciers > 1 km^{2} (0.386 sq mi or 247 acres) and river estuaries.

Ivrey (French pronunciation: [ivʁɛ]) is a commune in the Jura department in Bourgogne-Franche-Comté in eastern France.

== Population ==
Historical population
Year	Pop.	±% p.a.
1968	62	—
1975	53	−2.22%
1982	47	−1.70%
1990	48	+0.26%
1999	58	+2.12%
2007	55	−0.66%
2012	63	+2.75%
2017	61	−0.64%
2023	63	+0.54%
Source: INSEE

== See also ==
- Communes of the Jura department
