= Les Arsures =

Commune in Bourgogne-Franche-Comté, France

- Commune
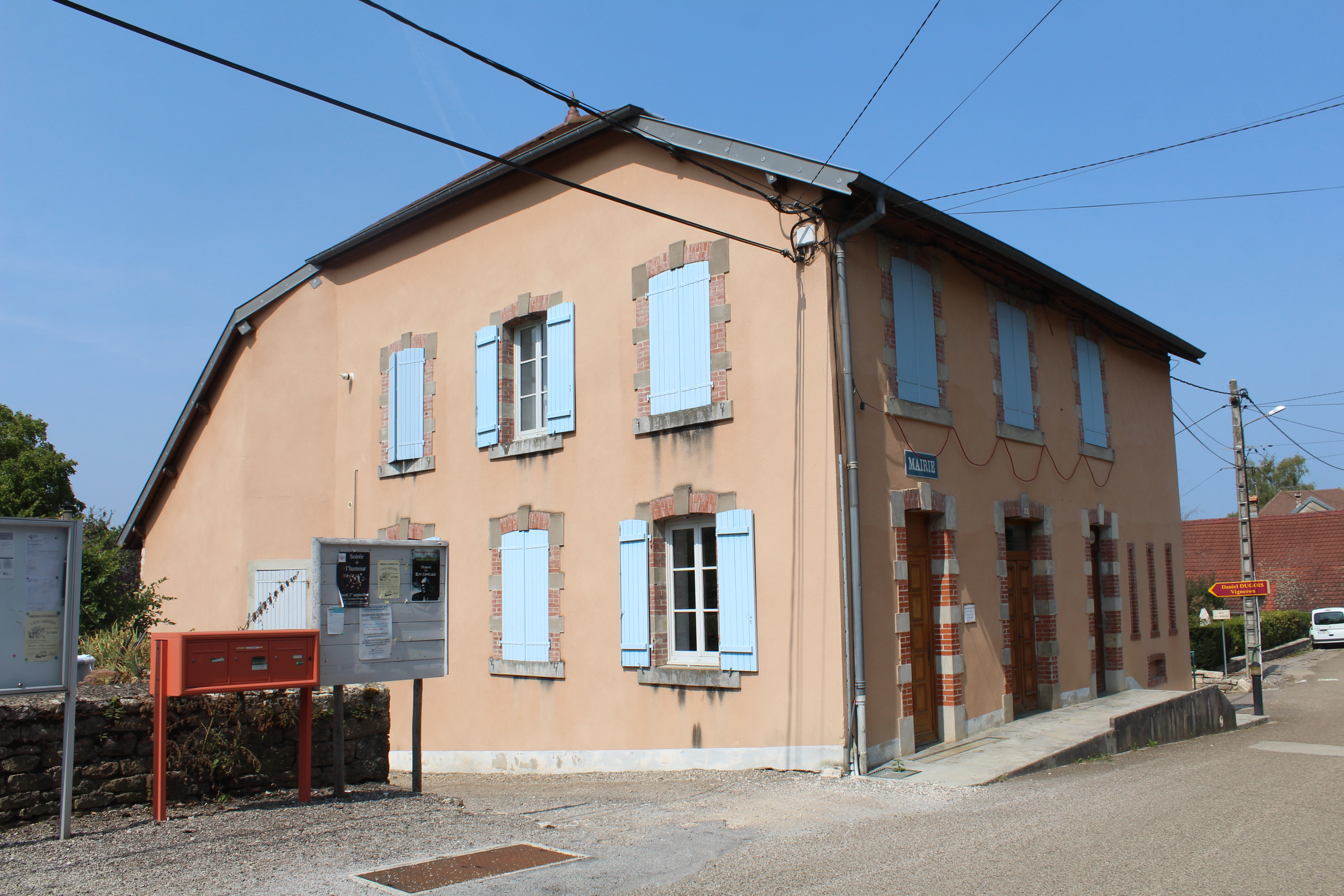
- The town hall in Les Arsures
- Location of Les Arsures
- Location within France Location within Bourgogne-Franche-Comté
- Coordinates: 46°57′00″N 5°47′29″E
- Country: France
- Region: Bourgogne-Franche-Comté
- Department: Jura
- Arrondissement: Dole
- Canton: Arbois

Government
  - Mayor (2020–2026): Roger Gros
- Area^{1}: 4.44 km^{2} (1.71 sq mi)
- Highest elevation: 400 m (1,300 ft)
- Lowest elevation: 256 m (840 ft)
- Population (2023): 229
  - Density: 51.6/km^{2} (134/sq mi)
- Time zone: UTC+01:00 (CET)
  - Summer (DST): UTC+02:00 (CEST)
- INSEE/Postal code: 39019 /39600
- ^{1} French Land Register data, which excludes lakes, ponds, glaciers > 1 km^{2} (0.386 sq mi or 247 acres) and river estuaries.

Les Arsures (French pronunciation: [le.z‿aʁsyʁ]) is a commune in the Jura department in the region of Bourgogne-Franche-Comté in eastern France.

== Population ==
Historical population
Year	Pop.	±% p.a.
1968	132	—
1975	137	+0.53%
1982	158	+2.06%
1990	205	+3.31%
1999	212	+0.37%
2007	230	+1.02%
2012	240	+0.85%
2017	230	−0.85%
2023	229	−0.07%
Source: INSEE

== See also ==
- Communes of the Jura department
