= Saint-Thiébaud =

Commune in Bourgogne-Franche-Comté, France

- Commune
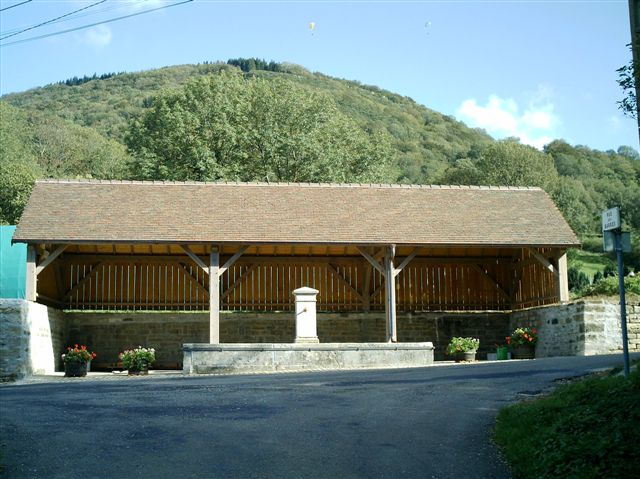
- The wash house in Saint-Thiébaud

- Coat of arms
- Location of Saint-Thiébaud
- Location within France Location within Bourgogne-Franche-Comté
- Coordinates: 46°58′22″N 5°51′57″E
- Country: France
- Region: Bourgogne-Franche-Comté
- Department: Jura
- Arrondissement: Dole
- Canton: Arbois

Government
  - Mayor (2023–2026): Nicolas Goncalves
- Area^{1}: 7.94 km^{2} (3.07 sq mi)
- Highest elevation: 850 m (2,790 ft)
- Lowest elevation: 380 m (1,250 ft)
- Population (2023): 71
  - Density: 8.9/km^{2} (23/sq mi)
- Time zone: UTC+01:00 (CET)
  - Summer (DST): UTC+02:00 (CEST)
- INSEE/Postal code: 39495 /39110
- ^{1} French Land Register data, which excludes lakes, ponds, glaciers > 1 km^{2} (0.386 sq mi or 247 acres) and river estuaries.

Saint-Thiébaud (French pronunciation: [sɛ̃ tjebo]) is a commune in the Jura department in the Bourgogne-Franche-Comté region in eastern France.

== Population ==
Historical population
Year	Pop.	±% p.a.
1968	61	—
1975	58	−0.72%
1982	67	+2.08%
1990	70	+0.55%
1999	60	−1.70%
2007	64	+0.81%
2012	72	+2.38%
2017	58	−4.23%
2023	71	+3.43%
Source: INSEE

== See also ==
- Communes of the Jura department
