= Mesnay =

Commune in Bourgogne-Franche-Comté, France

- Commune
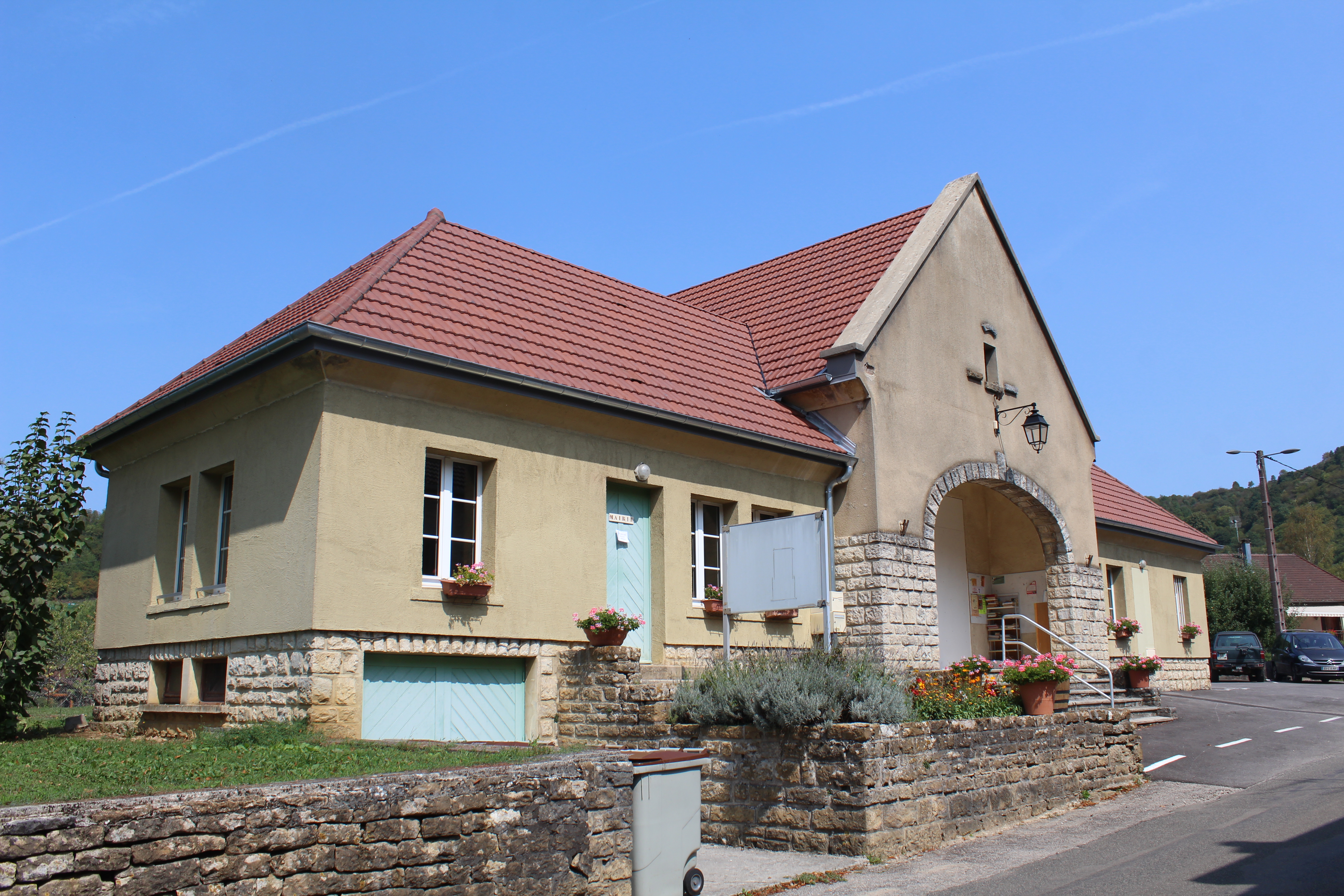
- The town hall in Mesnay
- Location of Mesnay
- Location within France Location within Bourgogne-Franche-Comté
- Coordinates: 46°54′09″N 5°47′53″E
- Country: France
- Region: Bourgogne-Franche-Comté
- Department: Jura
- Arrondissement: Dole
- Canton: Arbois
- Intercommunality: CC Arbois Poligny Salins Coeur du Jura

Government
  - Mayor (2020–2026): Pascal Drogrey
- Area^{1}: 8.32 km^{2} (3.21 sq mi)
- Highest elevation: 600 m (2,000 ft)
- Lowest elevation: 303 m (994 ft)
- Population (2023): 579
  - Density: 69.6/km^{2} (180/sq mi)
- Time zone: UTC+01:00 (CET)
  - Summer (DST): UTC+02:00 (CEST)
- INSEE/Postal code: 39325 /39600
- ^{1} French Land Register data, which excludes lakes, ponds, glaciers > 1 km^{2} (0.386 sq mi or 247 acres) and river estuaries.

Mesnay (French pronunciation: [mɛnɛ]; Arpitan: Moinney) is a commune in the Jura department in Bourgogne-Franche-Comté in eastern France.

== Population ==
Historical population
Year	Pop.	±% p.a.
1968	578	—
1975	505	−1.91%
1982	530	+0.69%
1990	489	−1.00%
1999	567	+1.66%
2007	548	−0.43%
2012	556	+0.29%
2017	583	+0.95%
2023	579	−0.11%
Source: INSEE

== Location ==
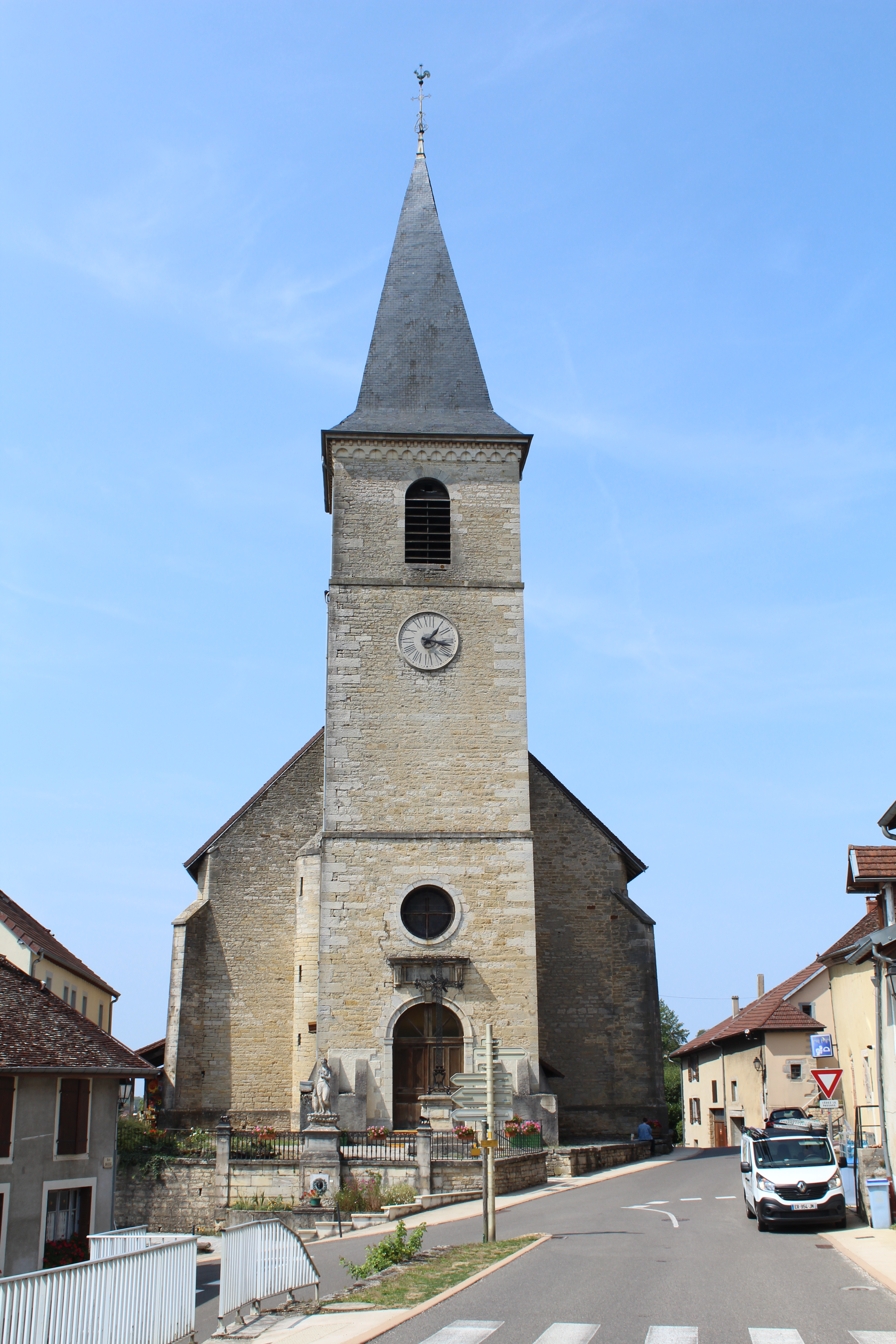
Saint-Oyan Church

Mesnay is located in the Reculée des Planches gorge, 1.8 km from Arbois, 3.4 km from Les Planches-près-Arbois

== Economy ==
Five winemakers currently have their cellars in Mesnay, whose south-facing slopes, known as the Côteau des Nouvelles, are covered in vines:

- Domaine Martin Faudot (Michel Faudot)
- Domaine de la Cibellyne (Benoît Royer)
- Domaine Hughes Béguet (Patrice Béguet)
- Domaine des Bélemnites (Christian Melet)
- Thomas Popy

Since 2011 the premises of the former village school have been occupied by a Montessori nursery and primary school, Graine de Vie.

== Places to Visit ==
The Cartonnerie de Mesnay, Écomusée du carton et maison de l'abeille. Originally a cardboard factory, Hétier Père et Fils, founded in 1710 on the banks of the Cuisance river, this disaffected industrial site has since been cleaned up and transformed into a cultural site. The former cardboard works can be visited in the Écomusée du carton, whilst a small, neighbouring museum, the Maison de l'abeille, provides an interesting introduction to apiculture, which still thrives in the village. The site is now also home to a number of associations, artists and craftspeople, including sculptors, a puppet-theatre company and a business producing high-end tree houses.

Every Tuesday evening throughout July and August the village organises a popular outdoor food market.

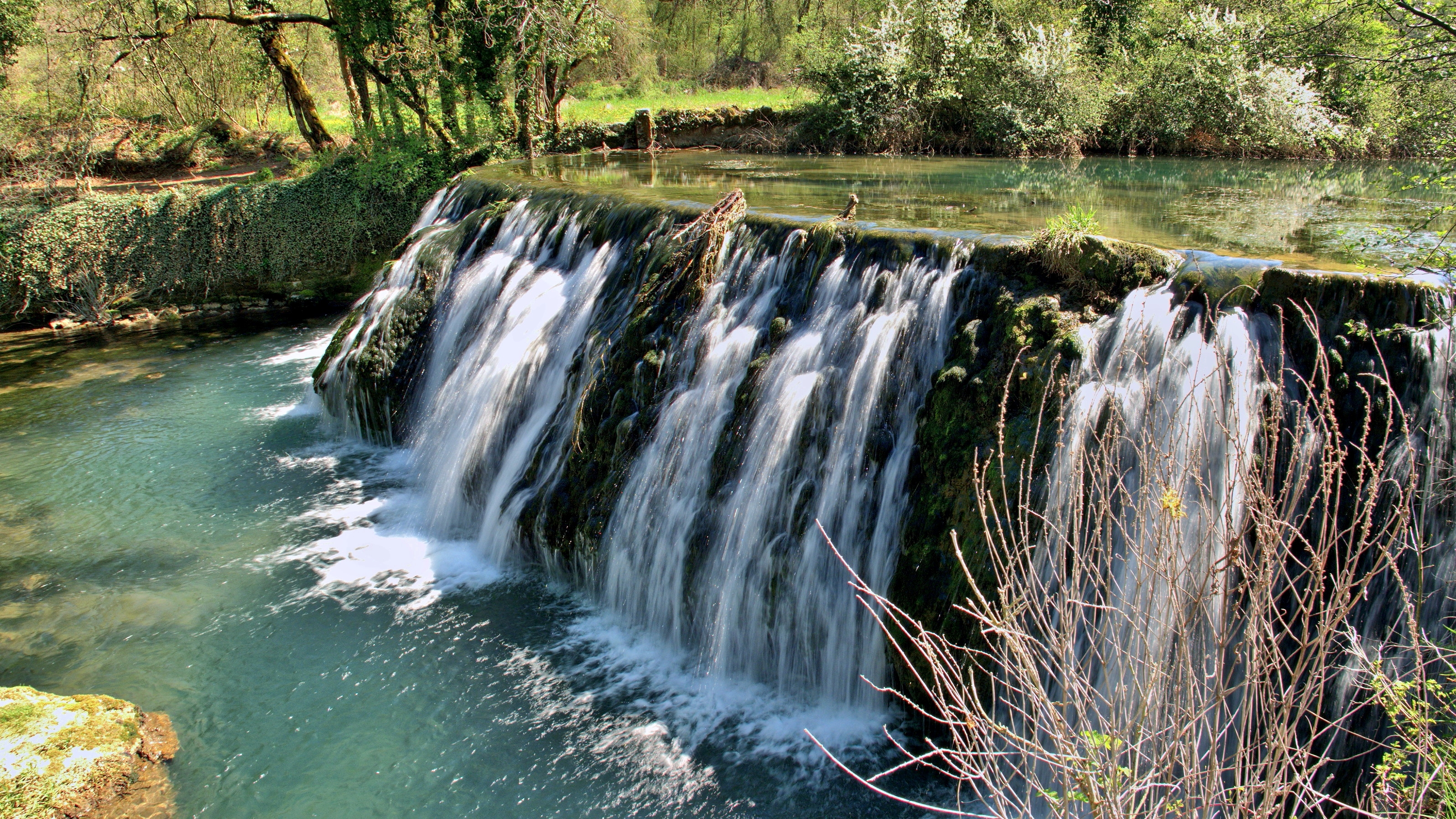
Dérochoir dam on the Cuisance

== See also ==
- Communes of the Jura department
