= Geraise =

Commune in Bourgogne-Franche-Comté, France

- Commune
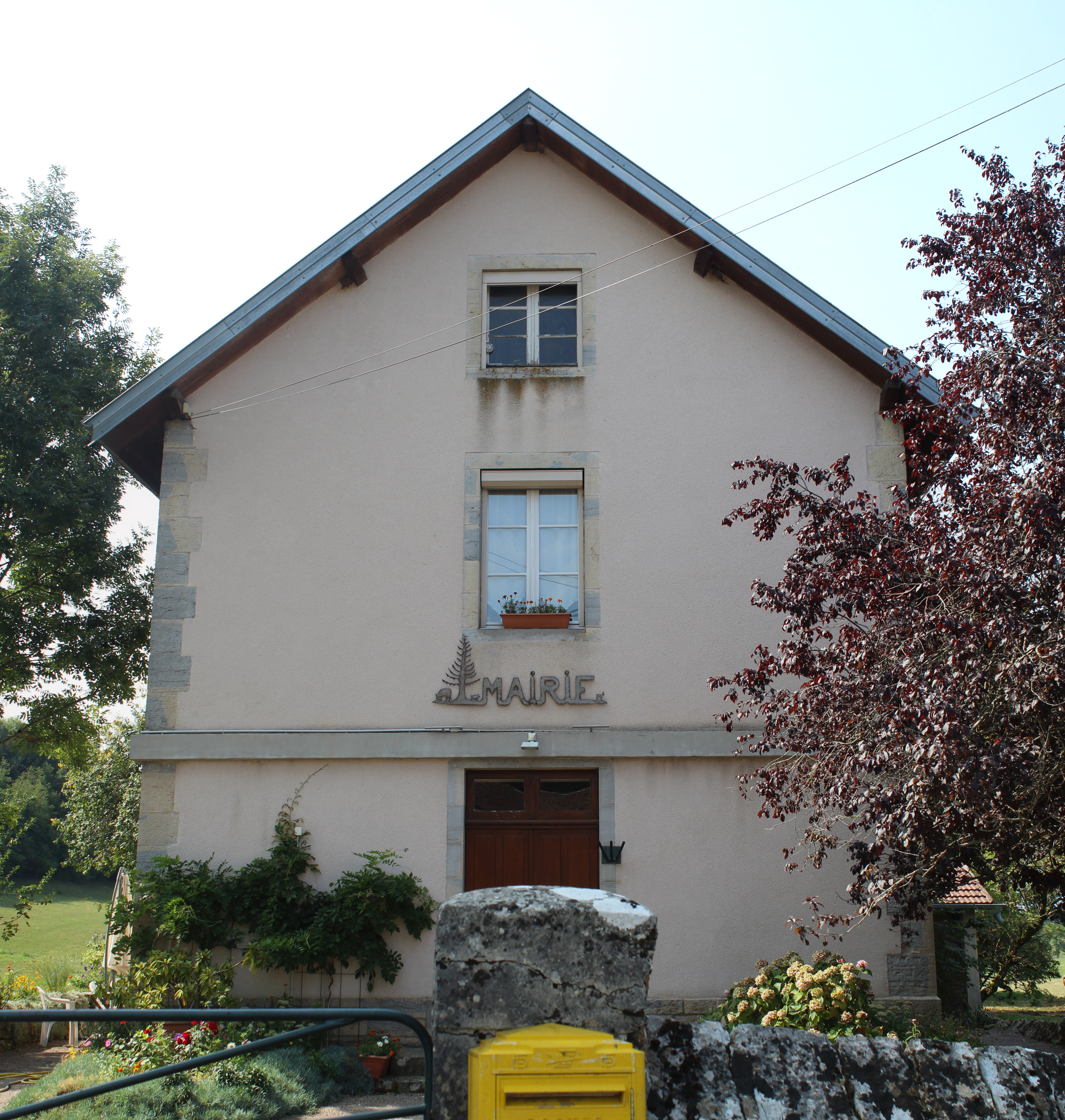
- The town hall in Geraise
- Location of Geraise
- Location within France Location within Bourgogne-Franche-Comté
- Coordinates: 46°57′27″N 5°56′57″E
- Country: France
- Region: Bourgogne-Franche-Comté
- Department: Jura
- Arrondissement: Dole
- Canton: Arbois

Government
  - Mayor (2020–2026): Valérie Paquiez
- Area^{1}: 6.04 km^{2} (2.33 sq mi)
- Highest elevation: 742 m (2,434 ft)
- Lowest elevation: 470 m (1,540 ft)
- Population (2023): 41
  - Density: 6.8/km^{2} (18/sq mi)
- Time zone: UTC+01:00 (CET)
  - Summer (DST): UTC+02:00 (CEST)
- INSEE/Postal code: 39248 /39110
- ^{1} French Land Register data, which excludes lakes, ponds, glaciers > 1 km^{2} (0.386 sq mi or 247 acres) and river estuaries.

Geraise (French pronunciation: [ʒəʁɛz]) is a commune in the Jura department in Bourgogne-Franche-Comté in eastern France.

== Population ==
Historical population
Year	Pop.	±% p.a.
1968	55	—
1975	41	−4.11%
1982	57	+4.82%
1990	51	−1.38%
1999	41	−2.40%
2007	40	−0.31%
2012	44	+1.92%
2017	42	−0.93%
2023	41	−0.40%
Source: INSEE

== See also ==
- Communes of the Jura department
