= Saint-Cyr-Montmalin =

Commune in Bourgogne-Franche-Comté, France

- Commune
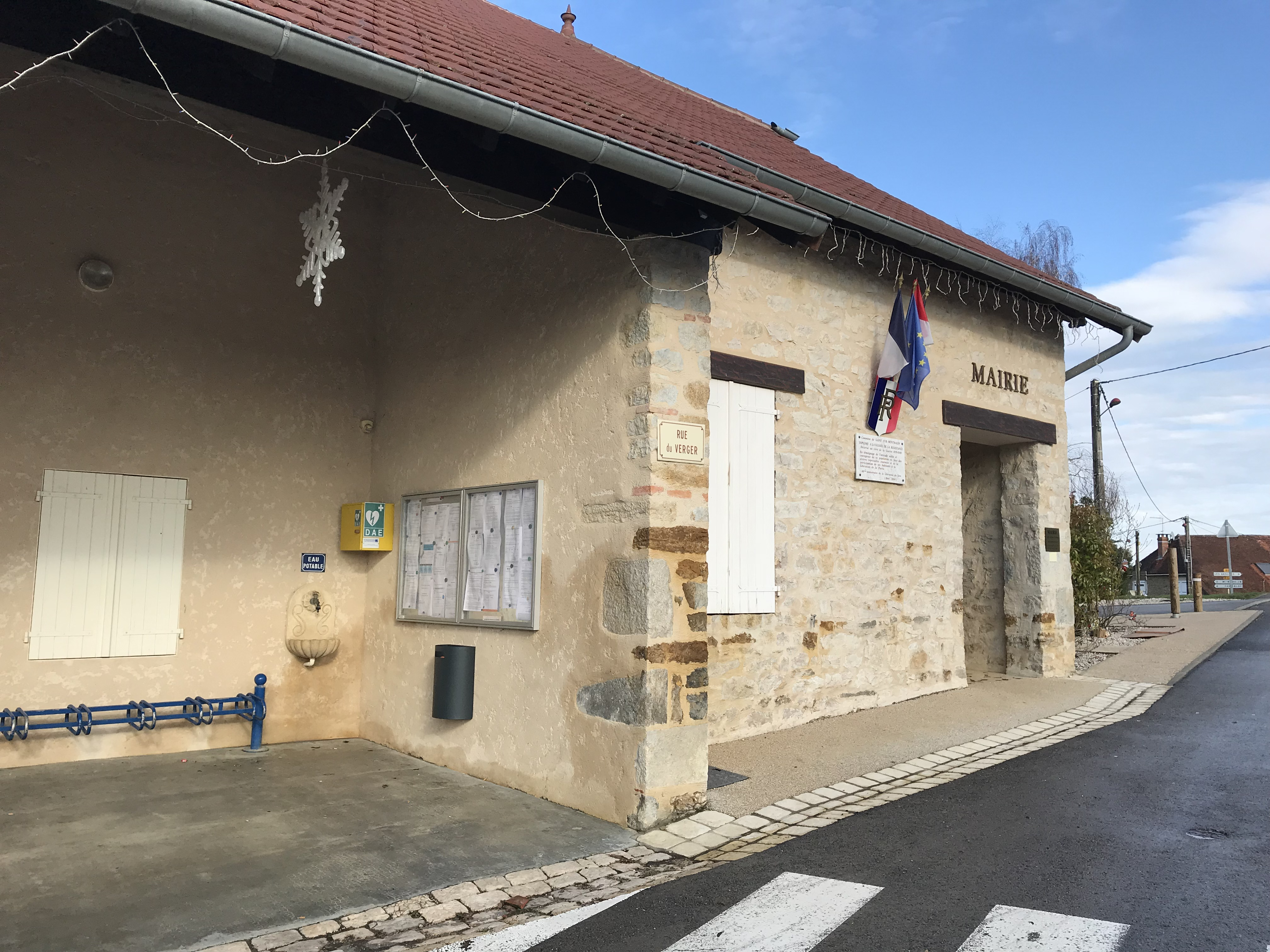
- The town hall in Saint-Cyr-Montmalin
- Location of Saint-Cyr-Montmalin
- Location within France Location within Bourgogne-Franche-Comté
- Coordinates: 46°57′N 5°44′E
- Country: France
- Region: Bourgogne-Franche-Comté
- Department: Jura
- Arrondissement: Dole
- Canton: Arbois

Government
  - Mayor (2024–2026): Bruno Poirot
- Area^{1}: 10.21 km^{2} (3.94 sq mi)
- Highest elevation: 335 m (1,099 ft)
- Lowest elevation: 237 m (778 ft)
- Population (2023): 245
  - Density: 24.0/km^{2} (62.1/sq mi)
- Time zone: UTC+01:00 (CET)
  - Summer (DST): UTC+02:00 (CEST)
- INSEE/Postal code: 39479 /39600
- ^{1} French Land Register data, which excludes lakes, ponds, glaciers > 1 km^{2} (0.386 sq mi or 247 acres) and river estuaries.

Saint-Cyr-Montmalin (French pronunciation: [sɛ̃ siʁ mɔ̃malɛ̃]) is a commune in the Jura department in the Bourgogne-Franche-Comté region in eastern France.

== Population ==
Historical population
Year	Pop.	±% p.a.
1968	142	—
1975	138	−0.41%
1982	144	+0.61%
1990	144	+0.00%
1999	172	+1.99%
2007	174	+0.14%
2012	229	+5.65%
2017	242	+1.11%
2023	245	+0.21%
Source: INSEE

== See also ==
- Communes of the Jura department
