= La Chapelle-sur-Furieuse =

Commune in Bourgogne-Franche-Comté, France

- Commune
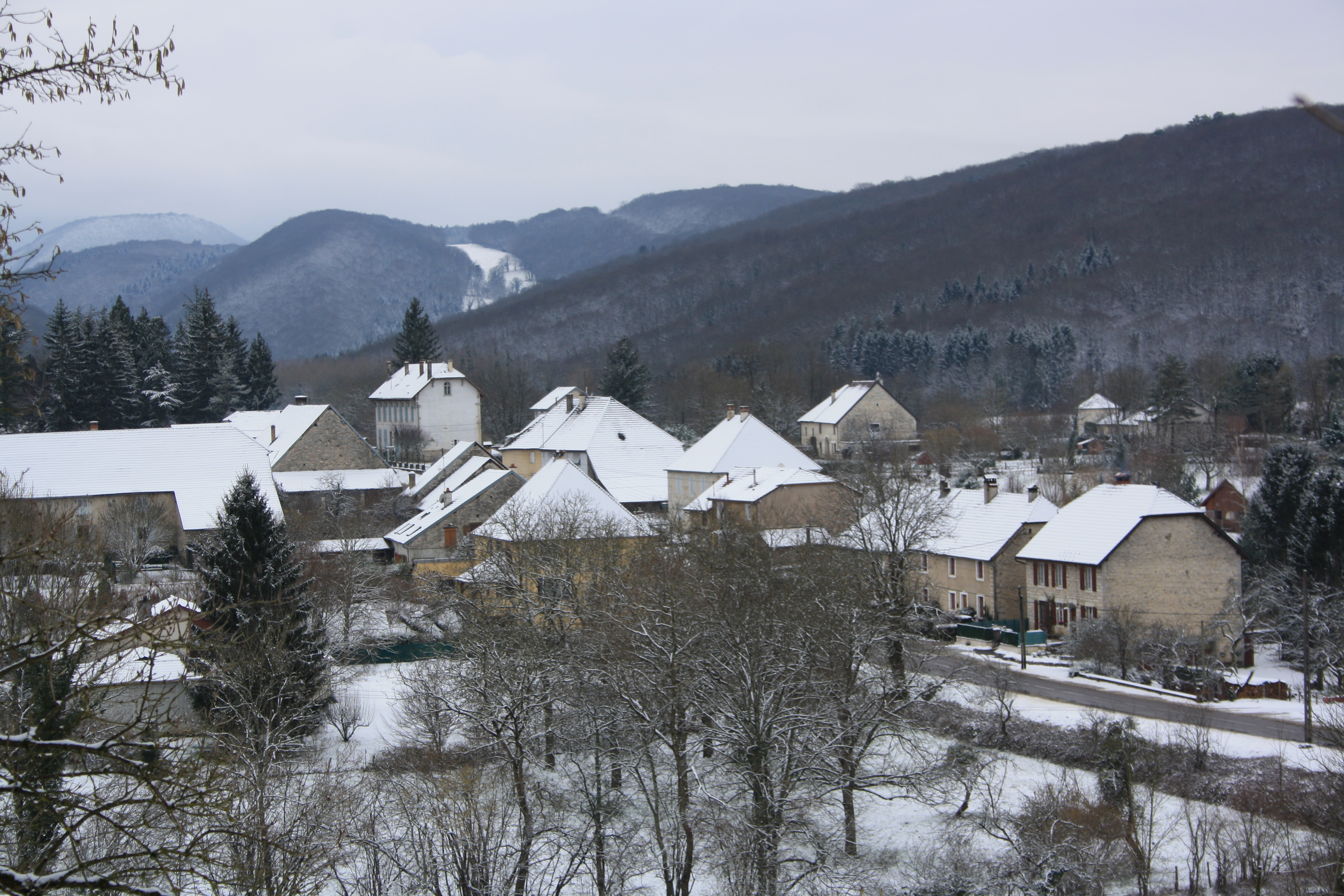
- A general view of La Chapelle-sur-Furieuse

- Coat of arms
- Location of La Chapelle-sur-Furieuse
- Location within France Location within Bourgogne-Franche-Comté
- Coordinates: 46°59′55″N 5°51′29″E
- Country: France
- Region: Bourgogne-Franche-Comté
- Department: Jura
- Arrondissement: Dole
- Canton: Arbois

Government
  - Mayor (2020–2026): Bernard Brunel
- Area^{1}: 9.03 km^{2} (3.49 sq mi)
- Highest elevation: 550 m (1,800 ft)
- Lowest elevation: 250 m (820 ft)
- Population (2023): 295
  - Density: 32.7/km^{2} (84.6/sq mi)
- Time zone: UTC+01:00 (CET)
  - Summer (DST): UTC+02:00 (CEST)
- INSEE/Postal code: 39103 /39110
- ^{1} French Land Register data, which excludes lakes, ponds, glaciers > 1 km^{2} (0.386 sq mi or 247 acres) and river estuaries.

La Chapelle-sur-Furieuse (French pronunciation: [la ʃapɛl syʁ fyʁjøz]) is a commune in the Jura department of Bourgogne-Franche-Comté in eastern France.

== Population ==
Historical population
Year	Pop.	±% p.a.
1968	222	—
1975	200	−1.48%
1982	224	+1.63%
1990	254	+1.58%
1999	286	+1.33%
2007	316	+1.25%
2012	328	+0.75%
2017	315	−0.81%
2023	295	−1.09%
Source: INSEE

== See also ==
- Communes of the Jura department
