= Aiglepierre =

Commune in Bourgogne-Franche-Comté, France

- Commune
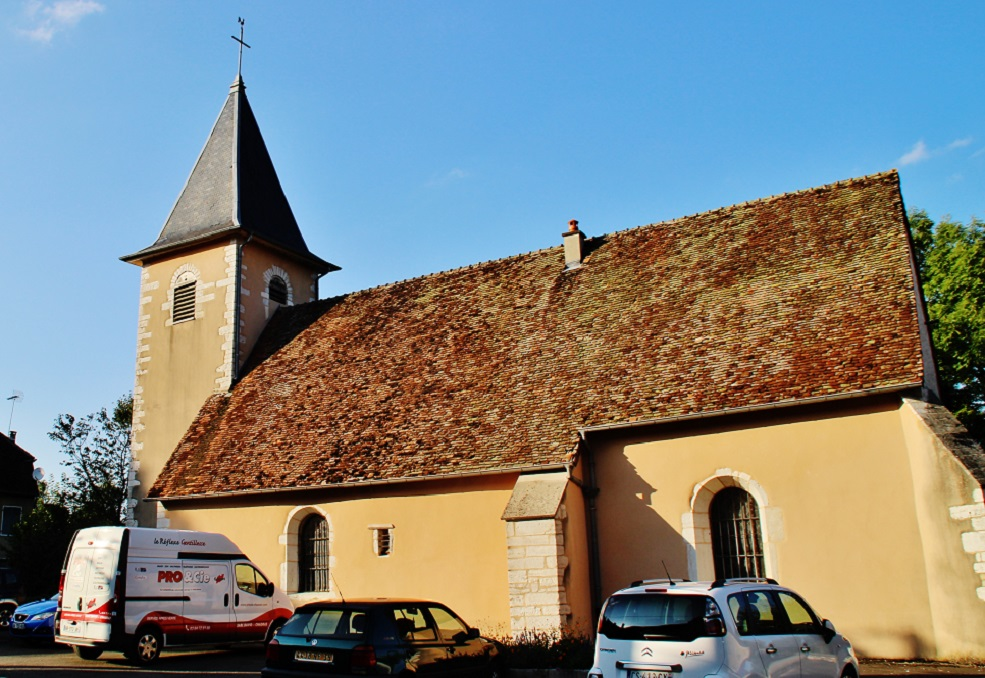
- The church in Aiglepierre

- Coat of arms
- Location of Aiglepierre
- Location within France Location within Bourgogne-Franche-Comté
- Coordinates: 46°57′11″N 5°49′11″E
- Country: France
- Region: Bourgogne-Franche-Comté
- Department: Jura
- Arrondissement: Dole
- Canton: Arbois
- Intercommunality: Arbois, Poligny, Salins - Cœur du Jura

Government
  - Mayor (2020–2026): Jean-Marie Renaud
- Area^{1}: 6.97 km^{2} (2.69 sq mi)
- Highest elevation: 631 m (2,070 ft)
- Lowest elevation: 278 m (912 ft)
- Population (2023): 412
  - Density: 59.1/km^{2} (153/sq mi)
- Time zone: UTC+01:00 (CET)
  - Summer (DST): UTC+02:00 (CEST)
- INSEE/Postal code: 39006 /39110
- ^{1} French Land Register data, which excludes lakes, ponds, glaciers > 1 km^{2} (0.386 sq mi or 247 acres) and river estuaries.

Aiglepierre (French pronunciation: [ɛɡləpjɛʁ]) is a commune in the Jura department in the region of Bourgogne-Franche-Comté in eastern France.

== Population ==
Historical population
Year	Pop.	±% p.a.
1968	220	—
1975	259	+2.36%
1982	301	+2.17%
1990	357	+2.16%
1999	342	−0.48%
2007	405	+2.14%
2012	424	+0.92%
2017	436	+0.56%
2023	412	−0.94%
Source: INSEE

== See also ==
- Communes of the Jura department
