= Molamboz =

Commune in Bourgogne-Franche-Comté, France

- Commune
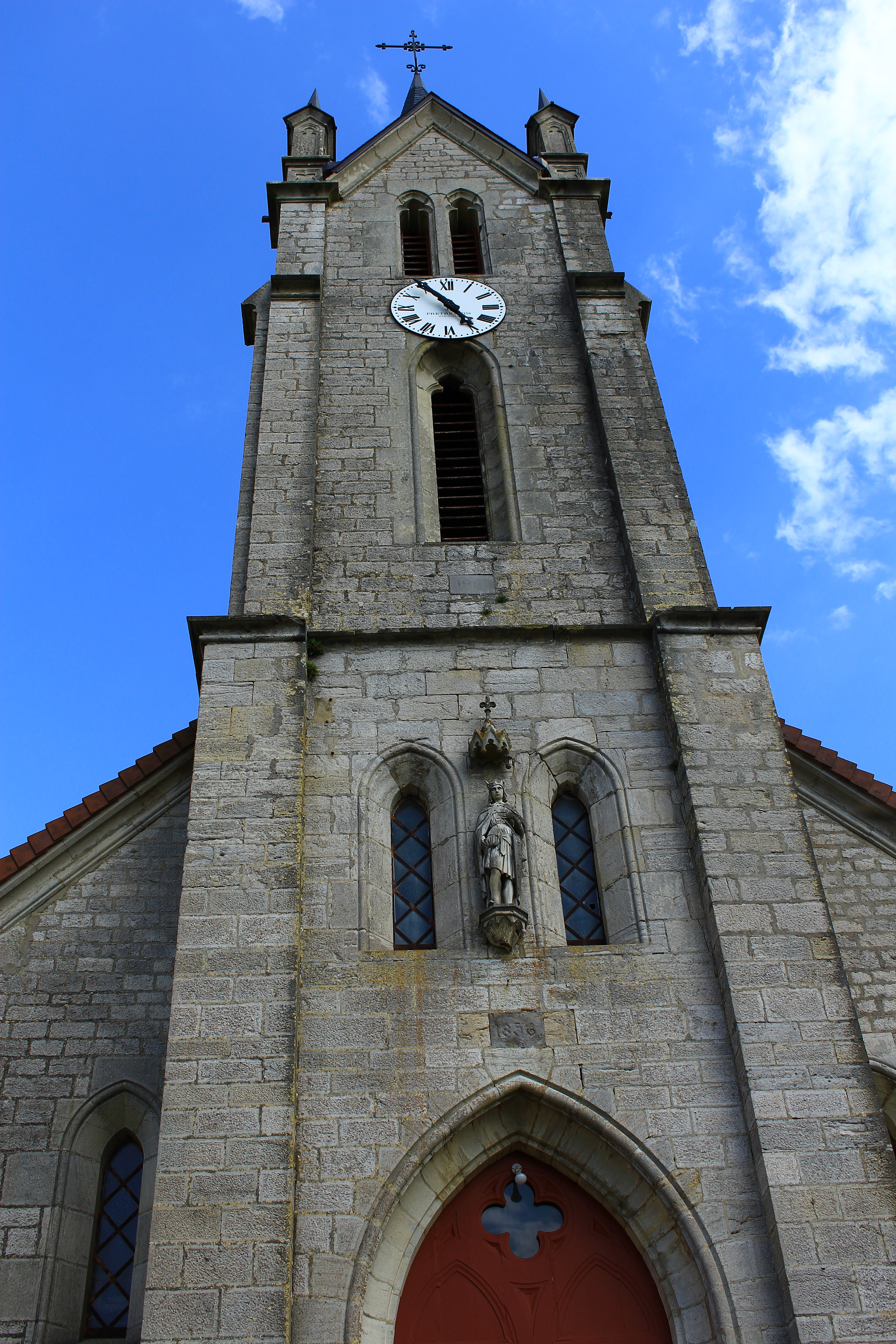
- The church of Molamboz
- Location of Molamboz
- Location within France Location within Bourgogne-Franche-Comté
- Coordinates: 46°56′26″N 5°41′12″E
- Country: France
- Region: Bourgogne-Franche-Comté
- Department: Jura
- Arrondissement: Dole
- Canton: Arbois

Government
  - Mayor (2020–2026): Jean de Brisis
- Area^{1}: 7.06 km^{2} (2.73 sq mi)
- Highest elevation: 290 m (950 ft)
- Lowest elevation: 223 m (732 ft)
- Population (2023): 88
  - Density: 12/km^{2} (32/sq mi)
- Time zone: UTC+01:00 (CET)
  - Summer (DST): UTC+02:00 (CEST)
- INSEE/Postal code: 39337 /39600
- ^{1} French Land Register data, which excludes lakes, ponds, glaciers > 1 km^{2} (0.386 sq mi or 247 acres) and river estuaries.

Molamboz is a commune in the Jura department in Bourgogne-Franche-Comté in eastern France.

== Population ==
Historical population
Year	Pop.	±% p.a.
1968	107	—
1975	96	−1.54%
1982	93	−0.45%
1990	107	+1.77%
1999	84	−2.65%
2007	94	+1.42%
2012	78	−3.66%
2017	90	+2.90%
2023	88	−0.37%
Source: INSEE

== See also ==
- Communes of the Jura department
