= Chaux-Champagny =

Commune in Bourgogne-Franche-Comté, France

- Commune
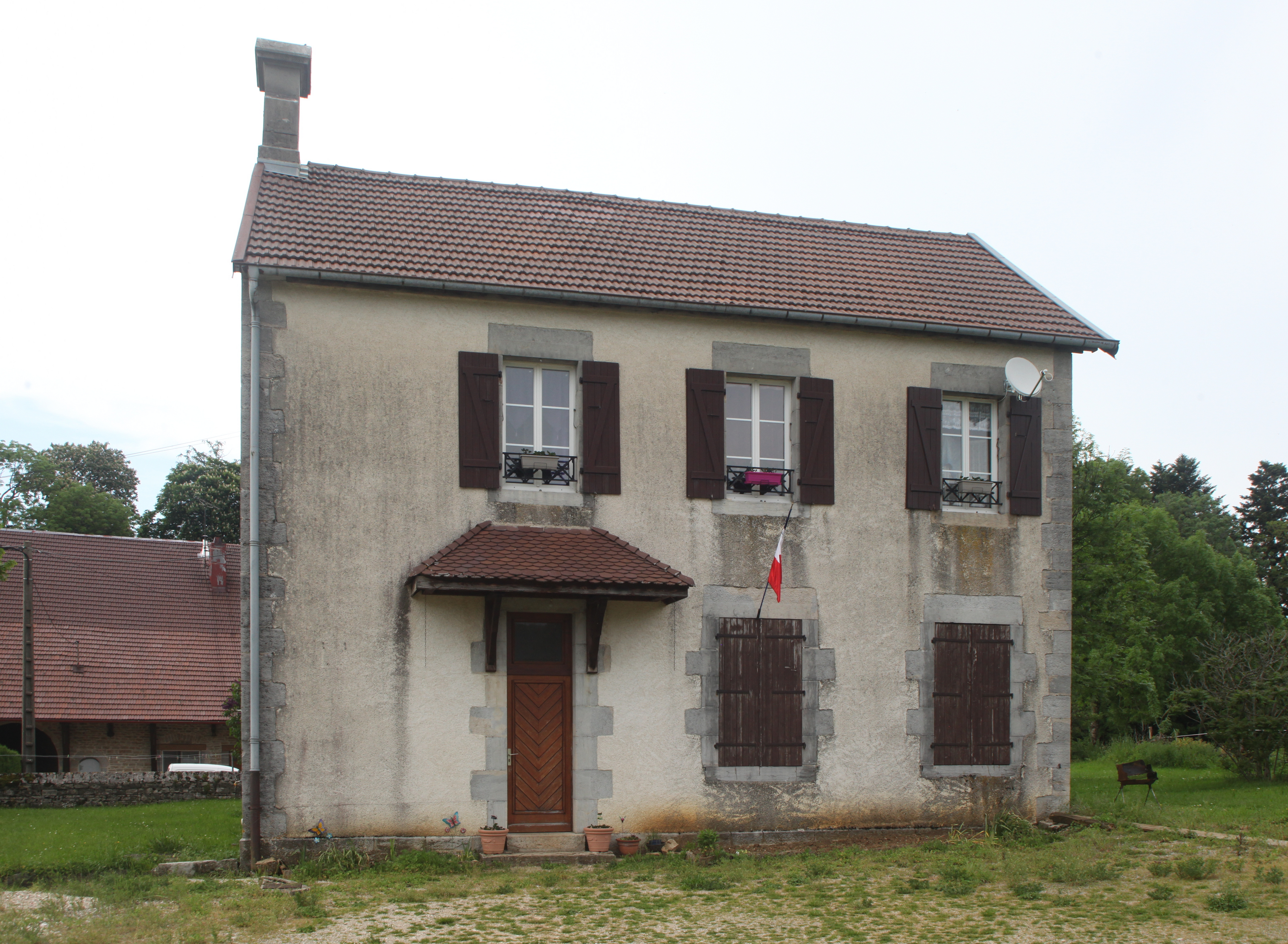
- The town hall in Chaux-Champagny
- Location of Chaux-Champagny
- Location within France Location within Bourgogne-Franche-Comté
- Coordinates: 46°53′47″N 5°53′23″E
- Country: France
- Region: Bourgogne-Franche-Comté
- Department: Jura
- Arrondissement: Dole
- Canton: Arbois

Government
  - Mayor (2020–2026): Christian Colin
- Area^{1}: 7.33 km^{2} (2.83 sq mi)
- Highest elevation: 740 m (2,430 ft)
- Lowest elevation: 401 m (1,316 ft)
- Population (2023): 73
  - Density: 10/km^{2} (26/sq mi)
- Time zone: UTC+01:00 (CET)
  - Summer (DST): UTC+02:00 (CEST)
- INSEE/Postal code: 39133 /39110
- ^{1} French Land Register data, which excludes lakes, ponds, glaciers > 1 km^{2} (0.386 sq mi or 247 acres) and river estuaries.

Chaux-Champagny (French pronunciation: [ʃo ʃɑ̃paɲi]) is a commune in the Jura department in Bourgogne-Franche-Comté in eastern France.

== Population ==
Historical population
Year	Pop.	±% p.a.
1968	77	—
1975	87	+1.76%
1982	97	+1.57%
1990	90	−0.93%
1999	73	−2.30%
2007	66	−1.25%
2012	70	+1.18%
2017	71	+0.28%
2023	73	+0.46%
Source: INSEE

== See also ==
- Communes of the Jura department
