= Pretin =

Commune in Bourgogne-Franche-Comté, France

- Commune
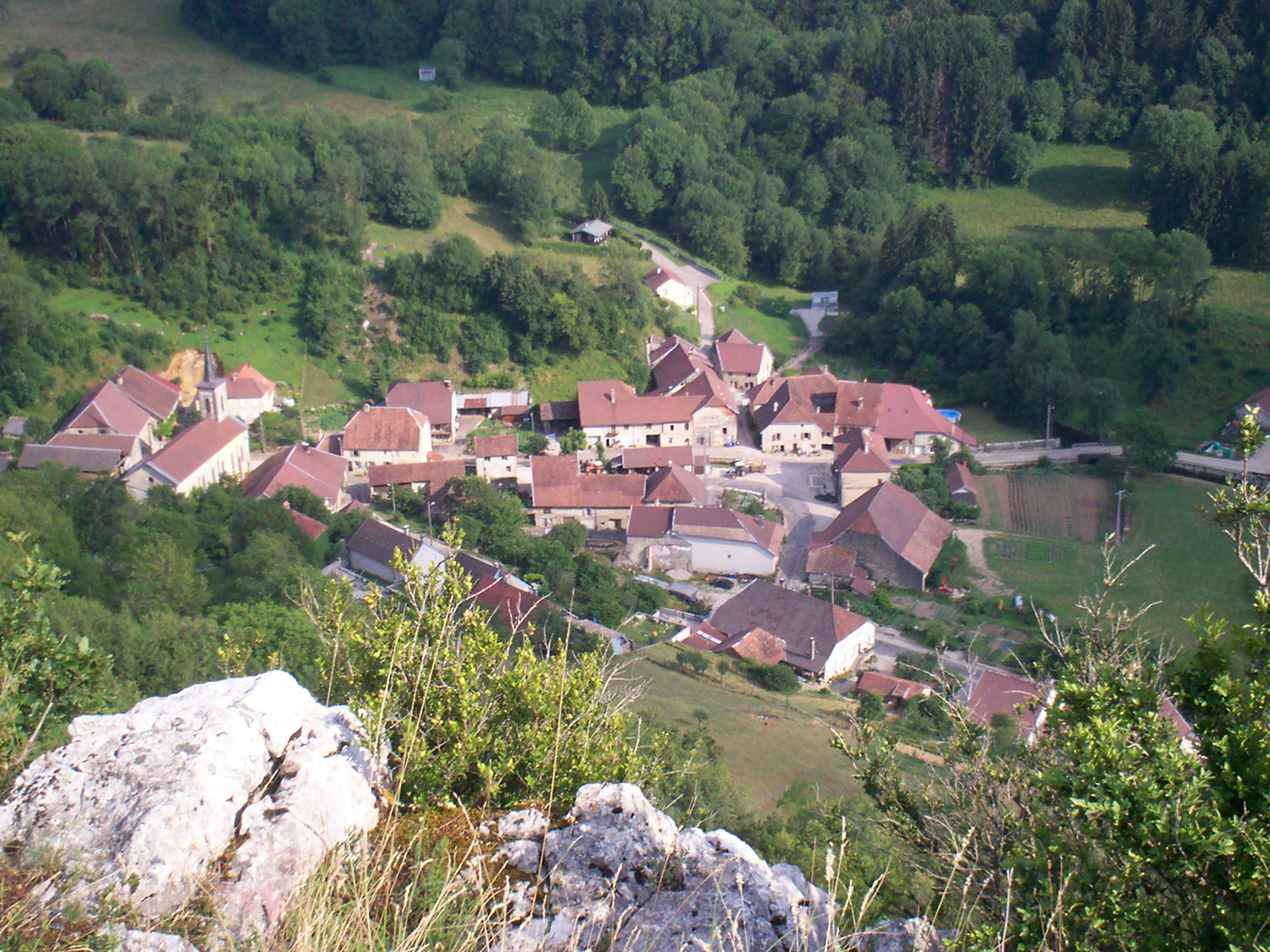
- A general view of Pretin
- Location of Pretin
- Location within France Location within Bourgogne-Franche-Comté
- Coordinates: 46°56′14″N 5°50′22″E
- Country: France
- Region: Bourgogne-Franche-Comté
- Department: Jura
- Arrondissement: Dole
- Canton: Arbois

Government
  - Mayor (2020–2026): Claude Romanet
- Area^{1}: 5.44 km^{2} (2.10 sq mi)
- Highest elevation: 631 m (2,070 ft)
- Lowest elevation: 346 m (1,135 ft)
- Population (2023): 48
  - Density: 8.8/km^{2} (23/sq mi)
- Time zone: UTC+01:00 (CET)
  - Summer (DST): UTC+02:00 (CEST)
- INSEE/Postal code: 39444 /39110
- ^{1} French Land Register data, which excludes lakes, ponds, glaciers > 1 km^{2} (0.386 sq mi or 247 acres) and river estuaries.

Pretin (French pronunciation: [pʁətɛ̃]) is a commune in the Jura department in Bourgogne-Franche-Comté in eastern France.

== Population ==
Historical population
Year	Pop.	±% p.a.
1968	111	—
1975	88	−3.26%
1982	68	−3.62%
1990	61	−1.35%
1999	66	+0.88%
2007	60	−1.18%
2012	63	+0.98%
2017	61	−0.64%
2023	48	−3.92%
Source: INSEE

== See also ==
- Communes of the Jura department
