= Abergement-le-Grand =

Commune in Bourgogne-Franche-Comté, France

- Commune
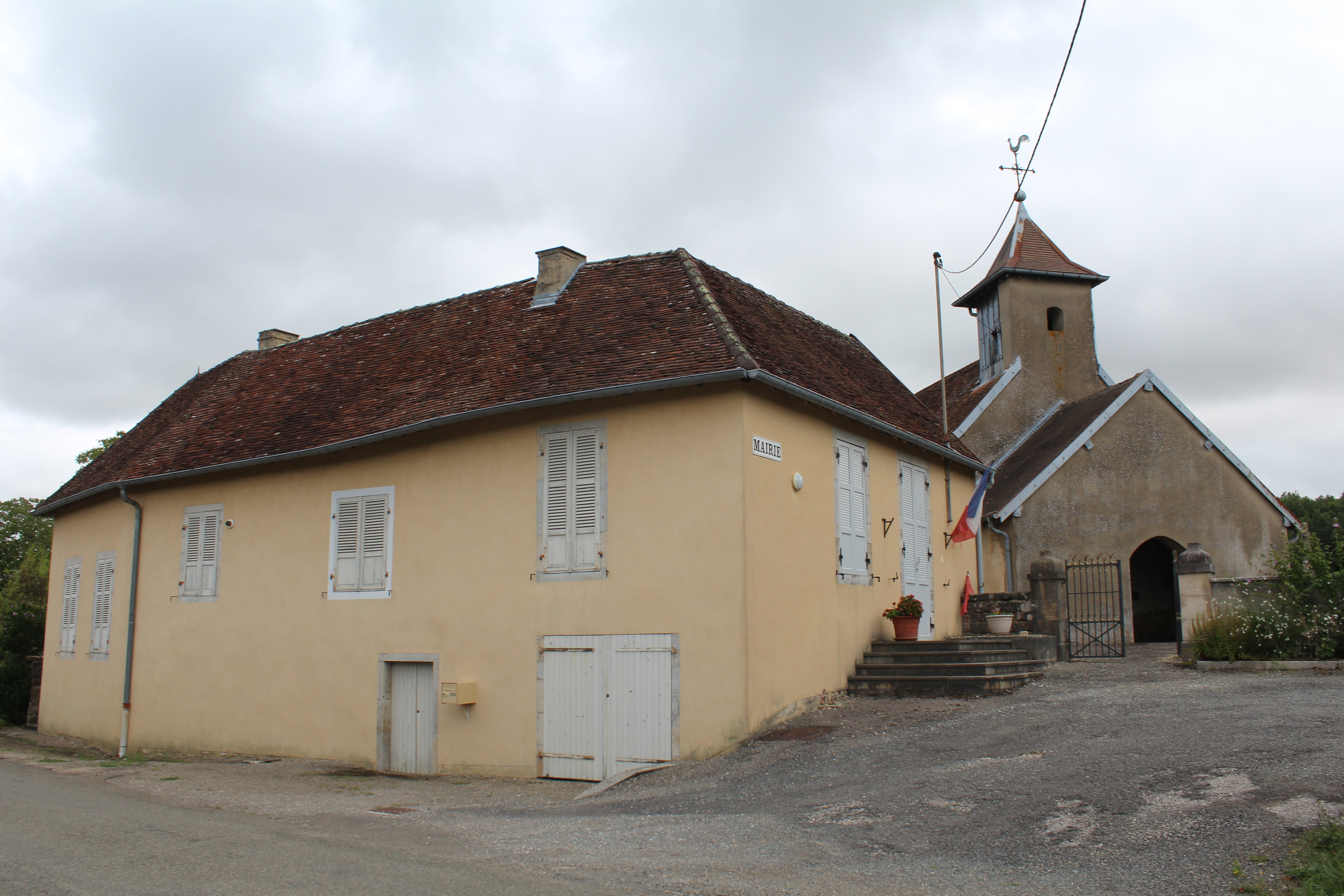
- The town hall in Abergement-le-Grand

- Coat of arms
- Location of Abergement-le-Grand
- Location within France Location within Bourgogne-Franche-Comté
- Coordinates: 46°54′51″N 5°40′56″E
- Country: France
- Region: Bourgogne-Franche-Comté
- Department: Jura
- Arrondissement: Dole
- Canton: Arbois
- Intercommunality: Arbois, Poligny, Salins – Cœur du Jura

Government
  - Mayor (2020–2026): Jean-Baptiste Baud
- Area^{1}: 4.22 km^{2} (1.63 sq mi)
- Highest elevation: 288 m (945 ft)
- Lowest elevation: 239 m (784 ft)
- Population (2023): 61
  - Density: 14/km^{2} (37/sq mi)
- Time zone: UTC+01:00 (CET)
  - Summer (DST): UTC+02:00 (CEST)
- INSEE/Postal code: 39002 /39600
- ^{1} French Land Register data, which excludes lakes, ponds, glaciers > 1 km^{2} (0.386 sq mi or 247 acres) and river estuaries.

Abergement-le-Grand is a commune in the Jura department in the region of Bourgogne-Franche-Comté in eastern France.

== Population ==
Historical population

Year	Pop.	±% p.a.
1793	206	—
1821	222	+0.27%
1846	243	+0.36%
1872	187	−1.00%
1901	153	−0.69%
1926	113	−1.20%
1946	107	−0.27%
1962	97	−0.61%
1968	69	−5.52%

Year	Pop.	±% p.a.
1975	56	−2.94%
1982	53	−0.78%
1990	42	−2.87%
1999	41	−0.27%
2007	60	+4.87%
2012	58	−0.68%
2017	58	+0.00%
2023	61	+0.84%

Source: EHESS (1793-1999) and INSEE

== See also ==
- Communes of the Jura department
