= Pont-d'Héry =

Commune in Bourgogne-Franche-Comté, France

- Commune
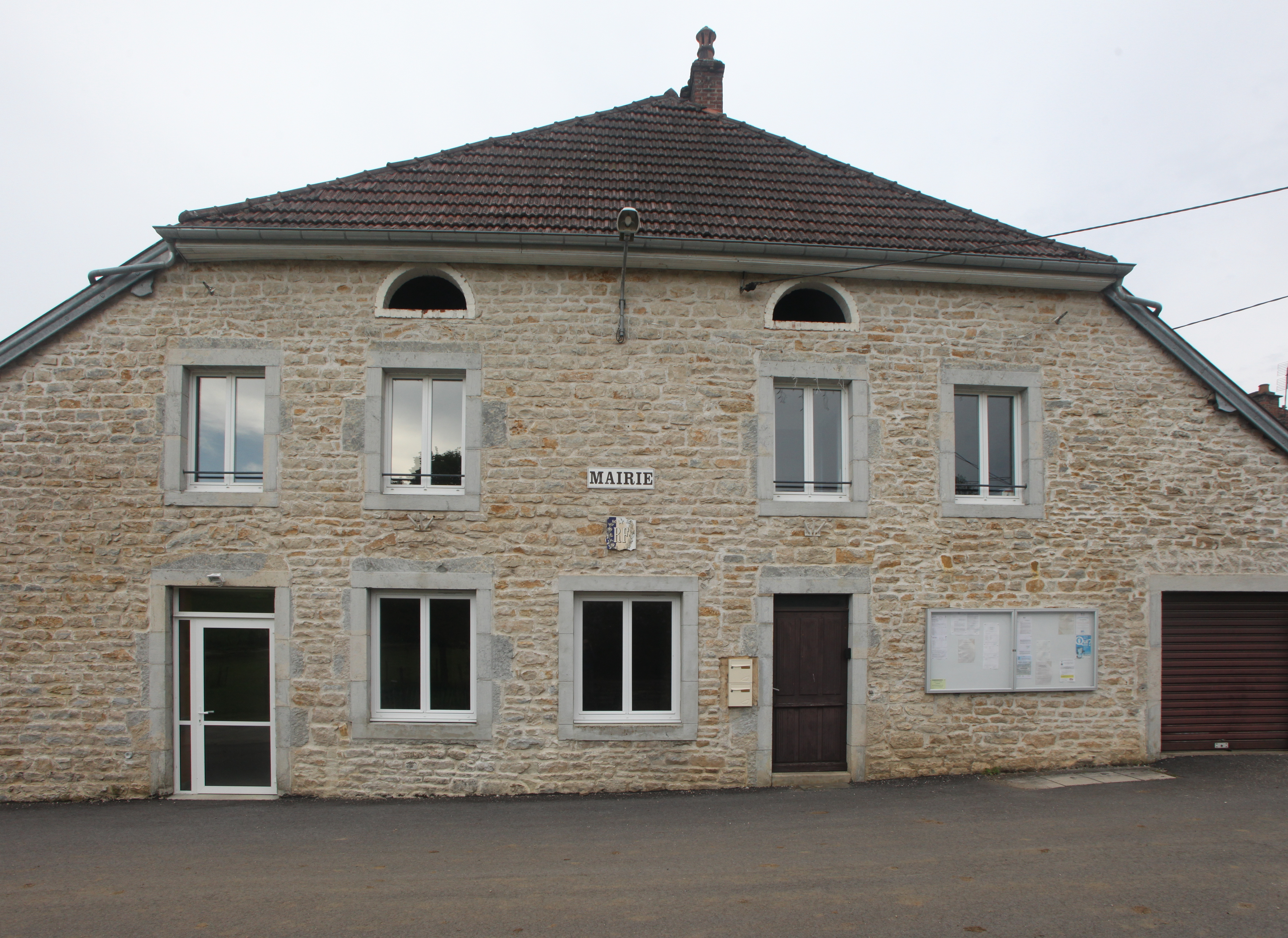
- The town hall in Pont-d'Héry
- Location of Pont-d'Héry
- Location within France Location within Bourgogne-Franche-Comté
- Coordinates: 46°52′20″N 5°54′03″E
- Country: France
- Region: Bourgogne-Franche-Comté
- Department: Jura
- Arrondissement: Dole
- Canton: Arbois

Government
  - Mayor (2020–2026): Bernard Laubier
- Area^{1}: 13.54 km^{2} (5.23 sq mi)
- Highest elevation: 781 m (2,562 ft)
- Lowest elevation: 430 m (1,410 ft)
- Population (2023): 244
  - Density: 18.0/km^{2} (46.7/sq mi)
- Time zone: UTC+01:00 (CET)
  - Summer (DST): UTC+02:00 (CEST)
- INSEE/Postal code: 39436 /39110
- ^{1} French Land Register data, which excludes lakes, ponds, glaciers > 1 km^{2} (0.386 sq mi or 247 acres) and river estuaries.

Pont-d'Héry (French pronunciation: [pɔ̃ deʁi]) is a commune in the Jura department in Bourgogne-Franche-Comté in eastern France. It absorbed the former communes Fonteny and Moutaine in 1972.

== Population ==
Historical population
Year	Pop.	±% p.a.
1968	343	—
1975	290	−2.37%
1982	240	−2.67%
1990	235	−0.26%
1999	208	−1.35%
2007	258	+2.73%
2012	258	+0.00%
2017	234	−1.93%
2023	244	+0.70%
Source: INSEE

== See also ==
- Communes of the Jura department
