= Thésy =

- Commune
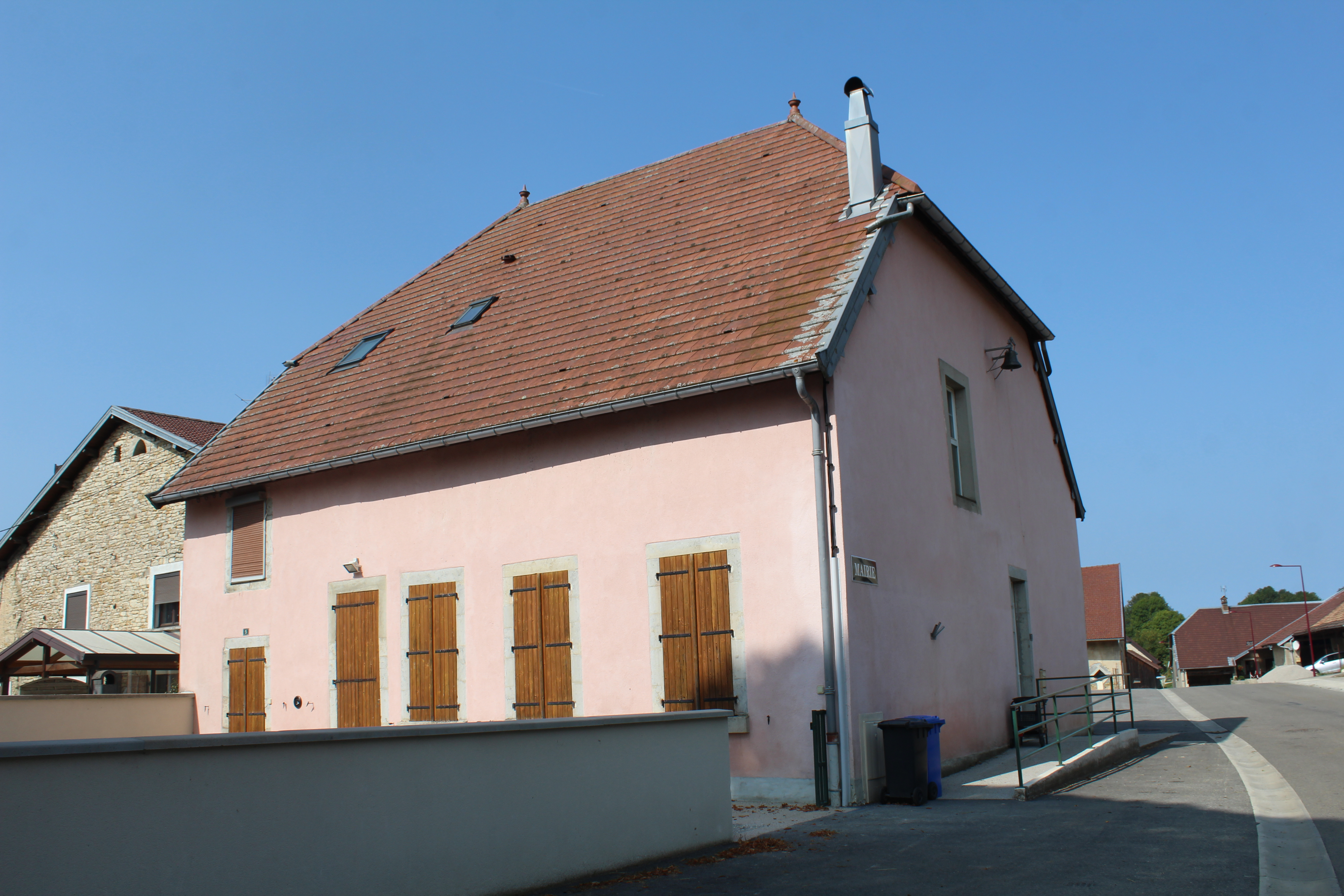
- The town hall in Thésy
- Location of Thésy
- Location within France Location within Bourgogne-Franche-Comté
- Coordinates: 46°54′48″N 5°55′27″E
- Country: France
- Region: Bourgogne-Franche-Comté
- Department: Jura
- Arrondissement: Dole
- Canton: Arbois

Government
  - Mayor (2020–2026): Marie-Christine Berthod
- Area^{1}: 4.92 km^{2} (1.90 sq mi)
- Highest elevation: 718 m (2,356 ft)
- Lowest elevation: 639 m (2,096 ft)
- Population (2023): 70
  - Density: 14/km^{2} (37/sq mi)
- Time zone: UTC+01:00 (CET)
  - Summer (DST): UTC+02:00 (CEST)
- INSEE/Postal code: 39529 /39110
- ^{1} French Land Register data, which excludes lakes, ponds, glaciers > 1 km^{2} (0.386 sq mi or 247 acres) and river estuaries.

Thésy (French pronunciation: [tezi]) is a commune in the Jura department in the Bourgogne-Franche-Comté region in eastern France.

== Population ==
Historical population
Year	Pop.	±% p.a.
1968	79	—
1975	77	−0.37%
1982	81	+0.73%
1990	74	−1.12%
1999	62	−1.95%
2007	66	+0.78%
2012	65	−0.30%
2017	66	+0.31%
2023	70	+0.99%
Source: INSEE

== See also ==
- Communes of the Jura department
