= Frédéric Lornet =

French wine producer

Frédéric Lornet

Frédéric Lornet is a wine producer who owns and runs the Abbaye de la Boutière in Montigny-lès-Arsures; a small village just outside Arbois in the Franche-Comté / Jura region of France.

== History ==
Arbois, childhood home to Louis Pasteur, has for centuries been the wine capital of the Jura. As the name Abbaye de la Boutière indicates, the winery was established near Arbois in a hoary Roman Catholic Cistercian (White Monk) abbaye.

The Jura is an eastern French winemaking region located between Burgundy and Switzerland - and its location has meant that some unique grape varieties (e.g. the white Savagnin and the reds Poulsard and Trousseau that are used to create highly unusual and rare wines.

Frédéric Lornet has been working with this palette and other grape types to make classic versions of French wine using Pinot noir and Chardonnay grapes. One of the rarest wines made at Abbaye de la Boutière is called vin jaune (Yellow Wine), which is made from the Savagnin grape (also known locally as Naturé). Abbaye de la Boutière also makes two sparkling wines: Cremant du Jura and Crémant du Jura Rosé. It also makes pure Savagnin wine and a Ploussard named L’Abbaye after the ancient Cistercian abbey where they are made. Moreover, Lornet makes a wine from the rare Trousseau grape he calls Trousseau des Dames, a unique Vin de Paille and some Macvin.

The common Appellations to all the Abbaye de la Boutière wines are: Côtes du Jura, Côtes du Jura Mousseux and a Crémant du Jura along with more localized Appellation such as : Arbois, Arbois Pupillin, Macvin and Vin de paille (straw wine).

== See also ==
- List of Appellation d'Origine Contrôlée wines
- Wine label
- History of Wine
- French wine
