= Montigny-lès-Arsures =

Commune in Bourgogne-Franche-Comté, France

- Commune
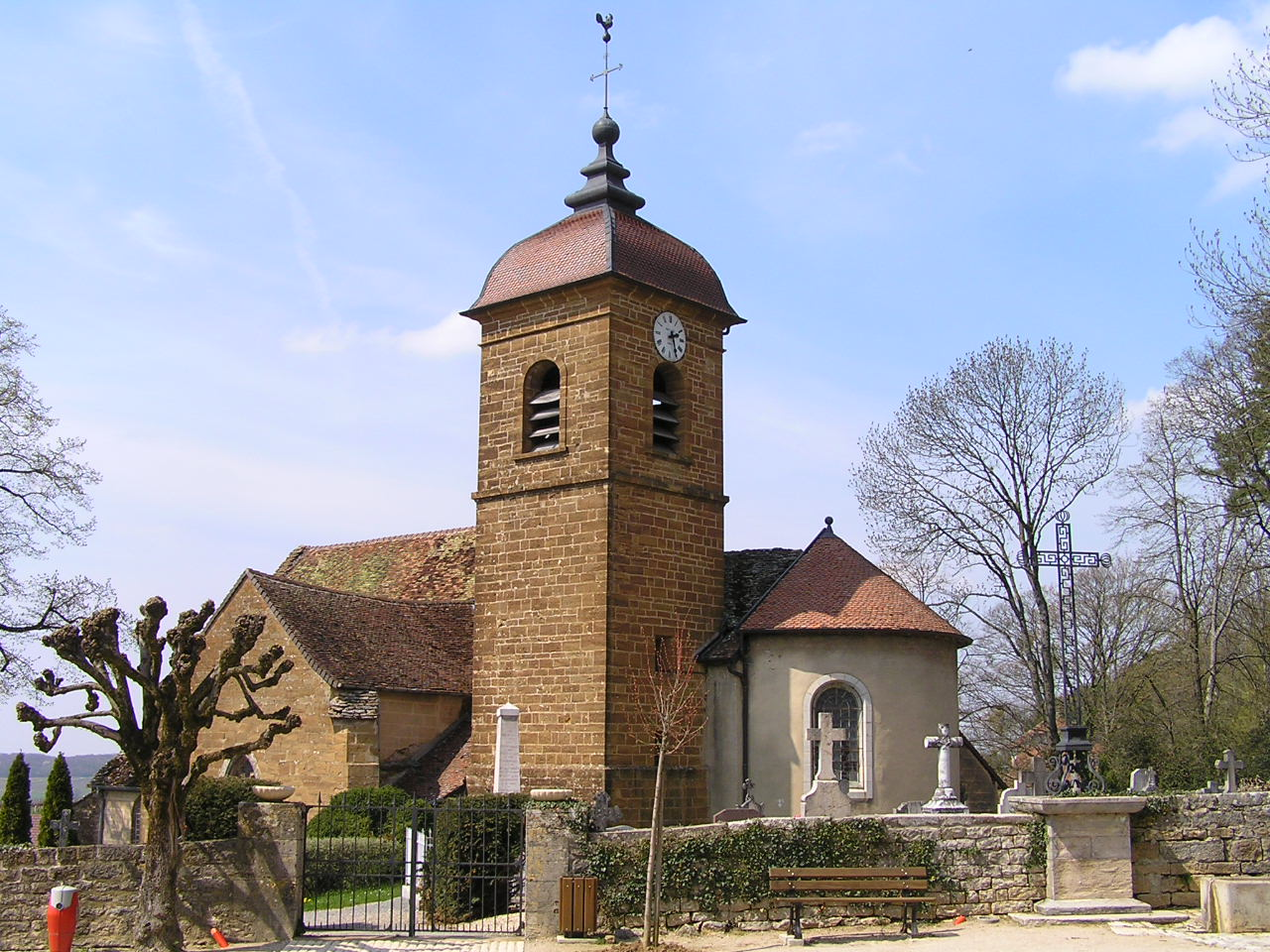
- Montigny-lès-Arsures Church
- Location of Montigny-lès-Arsures
- Location within France Location within Bourgogne-Franche-Comté
- Coordinates: 46°55′39″N 5°47′10″E
- Country: France
- Region: Bourgogne-Franche-Comté
- Department: Jura
- Arrondissement: Dole
- Canton: Arbois
- Intercommunality: CC Arbois, Poligny, Salins – Cœur du Jura

Government
  - Mayor (2020–2026): Dominique Gahier
- Area^{1}: 10.63 km^{2} (4.10 sq mi)
- Highest elevation: 580 m (1,900 ft)
- Lowest elevation: 254 m (833 ft)
- Population (2023): 236
  - Density: 22.2/km^{2} (57.5/sq mi)
- Time zone: UTC+01:00 (CET)
  - Summer (DST): UTC+02:00 (CEST)
- INSEE/Postal code: 39355 /39600
- ^{1} French Land Register data, which excludes lakes, ponds, glaciers > 1 km^{2} (0.386 sq mi or 247 acres) and river estuaries.

Montigny-lès-Arsures (French pronunciation: [mɔ̃tiɲi lɛ.z‿aʁsyʁ], literally Montigny near Arsures) is a village in the Jura department in Bourgogne-Franche-Comté in eastern France.

== Geography ==
Montigny is located in the heart of the Jura wine region, in the north-east of the Jura on the Jura wine Route and the Route Pasteur.

The Larine stream originates in the village, which it then proceeds to cross.

The village boasts the title of Capital of Trousseau, a local grape variety, since the village's limestone soil particularly suits this unique grape.

Arbois is 3 km from Montigny, Besançon 45 km, Dijon 30 km and Lausanne 100 km.

== Winemakers of Montigny-lès-Arsures ==
- Caveau de Bacchus
- Raphaël Fumey & Adeline Chatelain
- Michel Gahier
- Frederic Lornet
- Domaine du Pelican
- Caveau vigneron de la Fruitière Vinicole d'Arbois
- Domaine Jean-Louis Tissot
- Domaine André et Mireille Tissot

== Members of the Arbois wine cooperative that live in Montigny-les-Arsures ==
- Jean Pierre Bailly Maitre
- Bertrand De Sainte Marie
- Patrick Giboudeaux
- Franck Morin
- Joël Morin
- Emilie Morin
- Geneviève Morin
- Dominique Pointelin
- Florian Pointelin
- Denis Tissot
- Jean-Charles Tissot
- Christiane Viganoni

== See also ==
- Communes of the Jura department
- French wine
- Jura wine
