= Arbois =

Commune in Bourgogne-Franche-Comté, France

Arbois Arboué (Arpitan)
- Commune
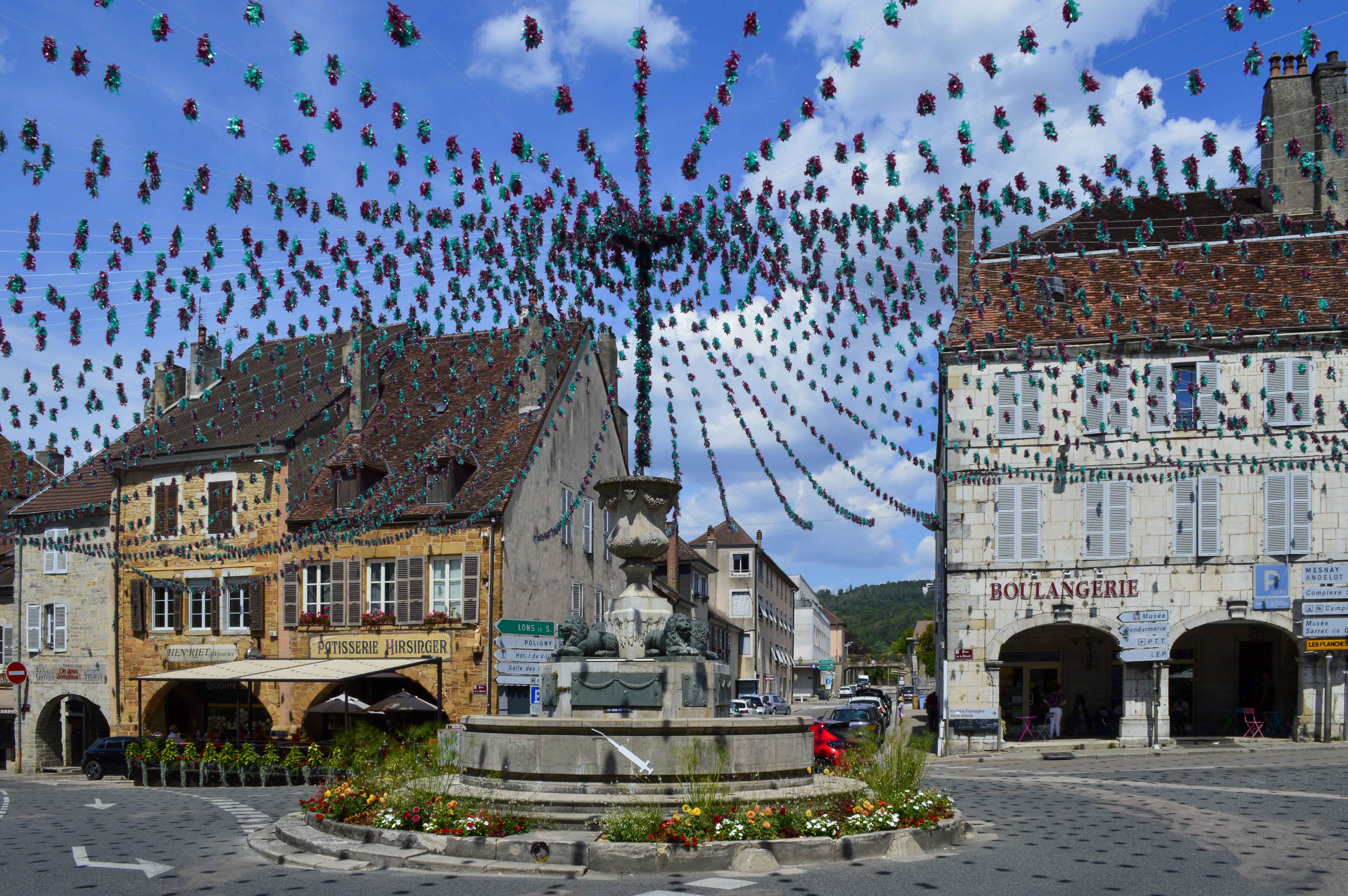
- Liberty square

- Flag Coat of arms
- Location of Arbois
- Location within France Location within Bourgogne-Franche-Comté
- Coordinates: 46°54′13″N 5°46′29″E
- Country: France
- Region: Bourgogne-Franche-Comté
- Department: Jura
- Arrondissement: Dole
- Canton: Arbois
- Intercommunality: Arbois, Poligny, Salins – Cœur du Jura

Government
  - Mayor (2020–2026): Valérie Depierre
- Area^{1}: 45.42 km^{2} (17.54 sq mi)
- Elevation: 293 m (961 ft)
- Highest elevation: 613 m (2,011 ft)
- Lowest elevation: 246 m (807 ft)
- Population (2023): 3,114
  - Density: 68.56/km^{2} (177.6/sq mi)
- Time zone: UTC+01:00 (CET)
  - Summer (DST): UTC+02:00 (CEST)
- INSEE/Postal code: 39013 /39600
- ^{1} French Land Register data, which excludes lakes, ponds, glaciers > 1 km^{2} (0.386 sq mi or 247 acres) and river estuaries.

Arbois (French pronunciation: [aʁbwa]; Arpitan: Arboué) is a commune in the Jura department, in the Bourgogne-Franche-Comté region, eastern France. The river Cuisance passes through the town, which centres on an arcaded central square where one can sample the local wines.

The commune has been awarded two flowers by the National Council of Towns and Villages in Bloom in the competition of Cities and Villages in Bloom.

== Geography ==
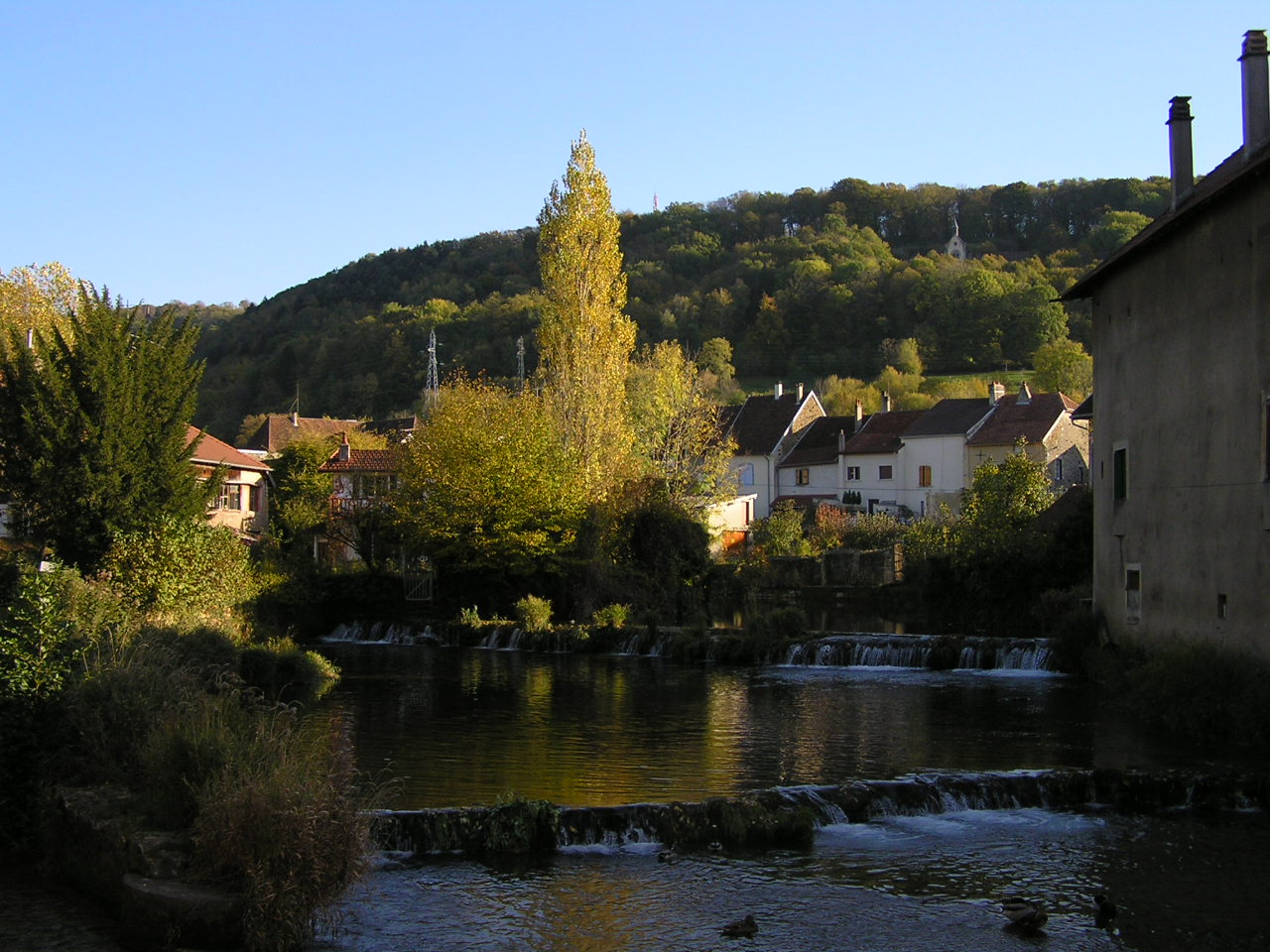
The Cuisance at Arbois

Arbois is located some 40 km southwest of Besançon and 30 km southeast of Dole. With a typical Revermont landscape, the plain is mainly used for cropping of cereals on medium-sized plots of land. The lower slopes consist mainly of meadows surrounded by small hedges for dairy farming, with some vineyards located in the same area. The rest of the hills is occupied by small vineyards with a few scattered meadows. The top of the hills and the plateau are heavily forested.

=== Communication and transport ===
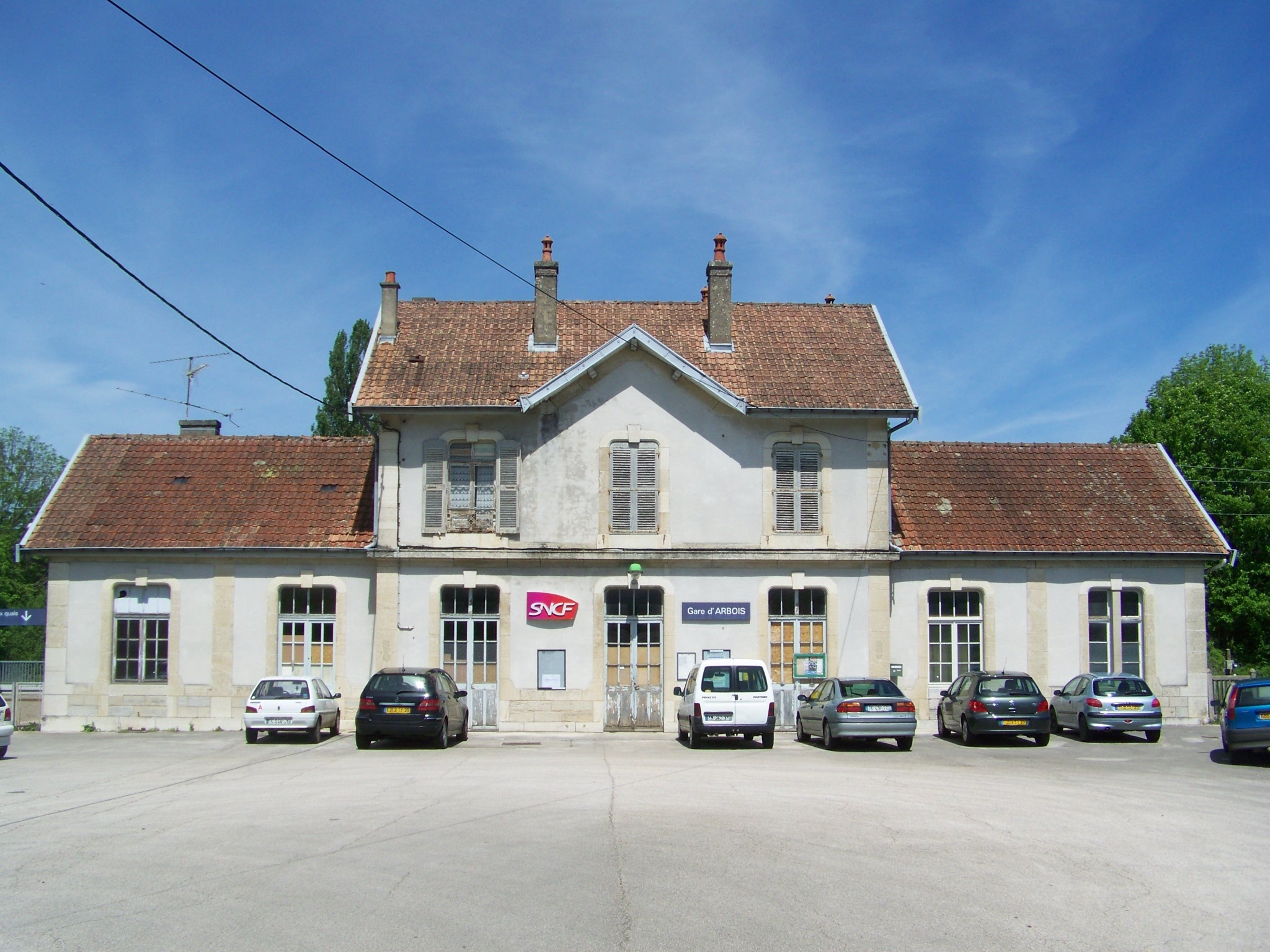
Arbois railway station

Access to the commune is by Route nationale N83 which comes from Mouchard in the north and passes through the town before continuing south to Buvilly. The D469 goes west from the village to Mathenay and the D107 goes east to Mesnay. The D14 goes north to Villers-Farlay and the D246 goes south to Pupillin.

The town is about 40 minutes drive from Dole (35 km), Besançon (48 km) and Lons-le-Saunier (38 km). It takes about 2 hours to reach Geneva by car, and 1 hour 45 minutes to drive to Lyon.

SNCF Arbois

The railway station is just north of the town and all TER Franche-Comté (Besançon-Lyon) trains serve this station. The nearest TGV station is at Mouchard on the Paris-Switzerland line.

Aerodrome

There is a small aerodrome in the north of the commune with the ICAO code LFGD and a restricted use runway.

=== Hydrology ===
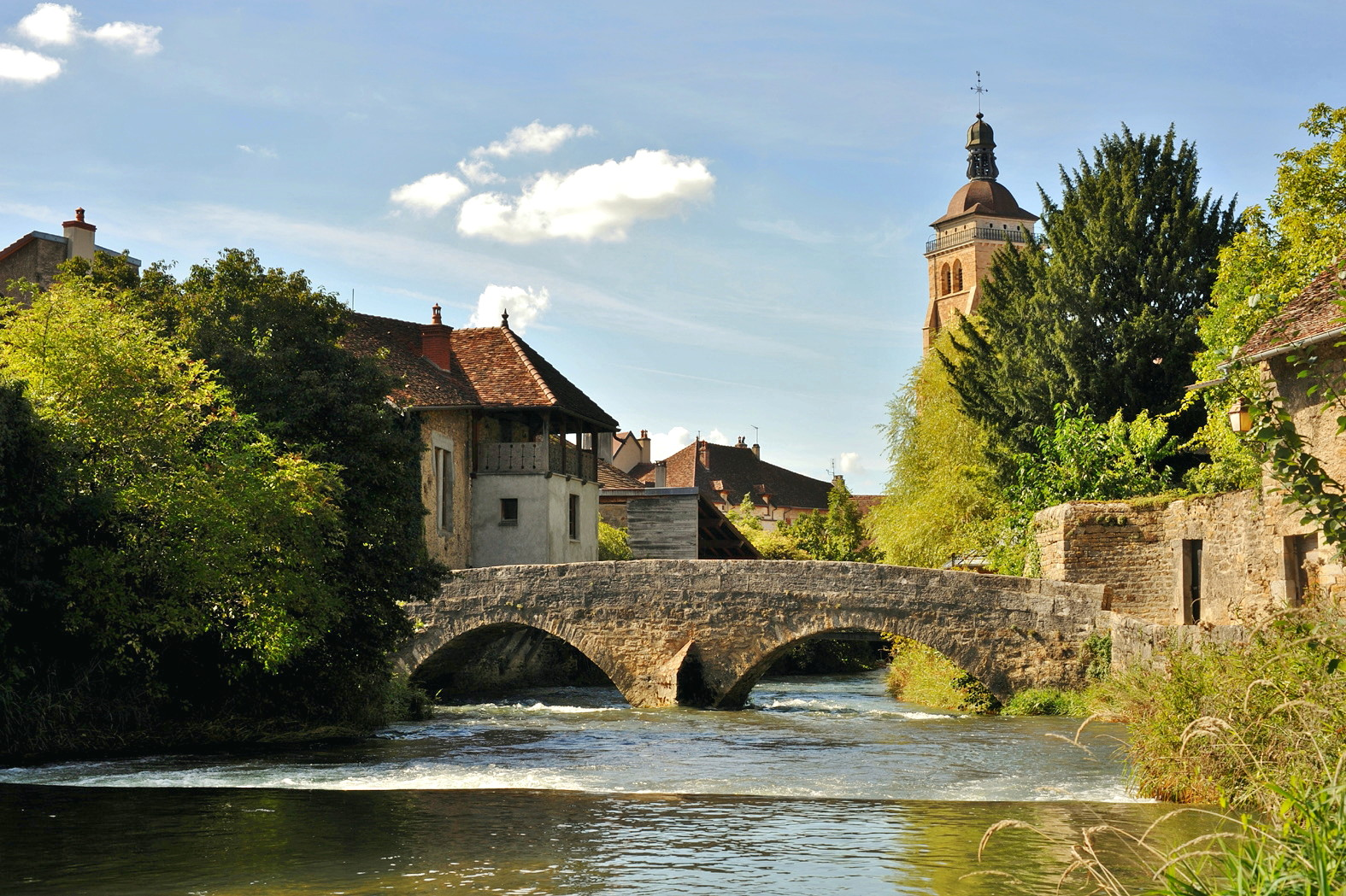
The Pont des Capucins on the Cuisance in Arbois

Arbois is traversed by the Cuisance river and is part of Revermont since it lies at the foot of the Plateau of Lons-le-Saunier, the first plateau of the Jura.

Together with Salins-les-Bains and Poligny, it forms the "Heart of the Jura" Community of Communes (Communauté des communes Coeur du Jura).

=== Climate ===
This small, historic town often enjoys episodes of fine weather from March through to October. The presence of vineyards reflects this and the Loue and Doubs rivers are far enough away to limit the occurrence of fog in the winter. The influence of the small Cuisance river is low. The town does, however, receive generous amounts of precipitation throughout the year, totaling nearly 1,000 mm annually. The climate is rather continental with cold winters and little snow but hot in summer.

== History ==
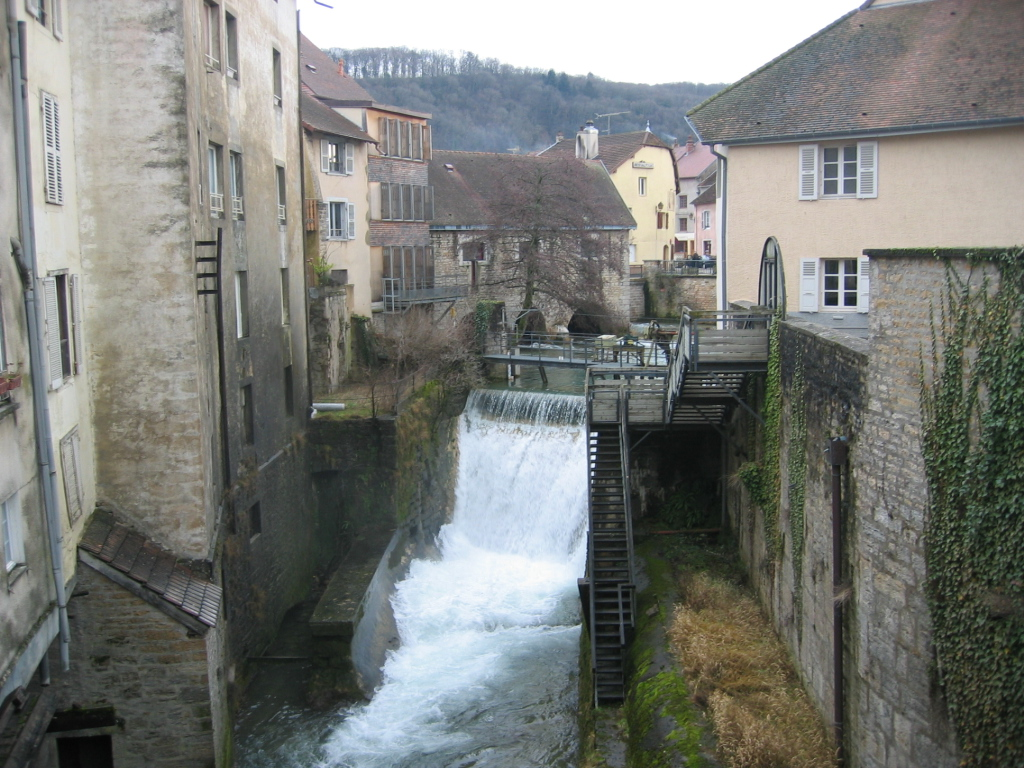
The Cuisance in Arbois

The origin of the town of Arbois dates back to remote times, although specifications are difficult. It is certain, however, that its wines were known to the Romans.

Until 1260, Arbois was a villa or town without defences: it was surrounded by ramparts during the following ten years.

Arbois endured seven sieges when it was part of the Duchy of Burgundy, including sackings by Charles I of Amboise (in 1479 while he was governor of the County of Burgundy under Louis XI), Henry IV (when the town held out for three weeks against the King's 25,000 troops), and Louis XIV. A castle was built in 1270, some vestiges of which survived the dismantling that Louis XIV ordered in 1678 following the conquest of Franche-Comté. There remain stretches of wall, pierced for archers, three round towers, and the square Gloriette tower.

When the republic was proclaimed at Lyon on 13 April 1834, the town joined the revolt against the government, which promptly sent a small force of grenadiers, cavalry, and a battery of artillery to subdue it.

The U.S. 36th Infantry Division liberated Arbois in September 1944 as it moved up the Rhône towards Besançon and then on to the Moselle.

=== Heraldry ===
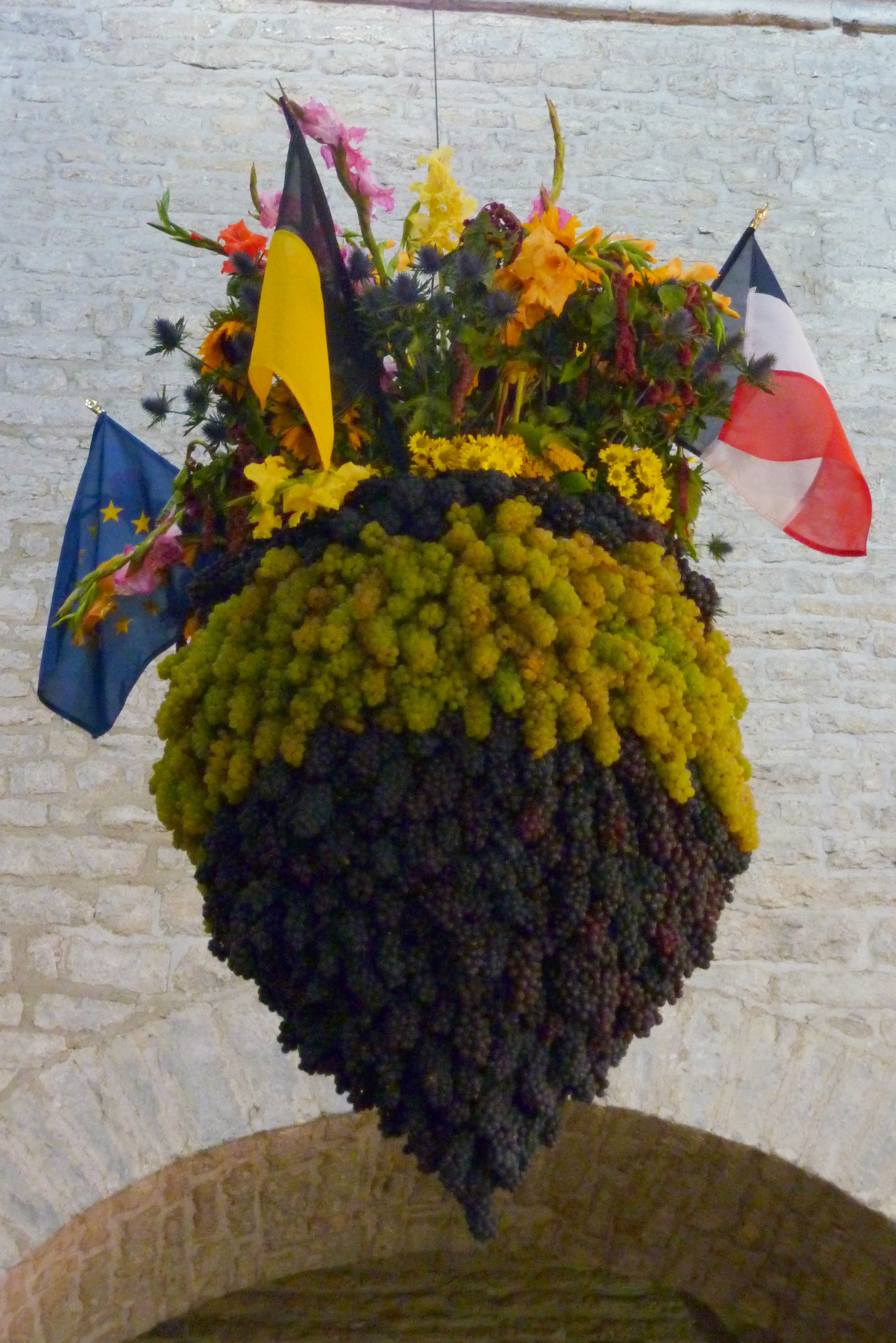
A Biou

The Arbois symbol is the heraldic pelican which is called a Pelican in her piety who is feeding her young from her beak. This is a Christian symbol and is accompanied by the motto of the city which is Sic his quos diligo (So I do for those I love). The Arbois band, which plays during the Biou festival is called Le Pelican in reference to this symbolic bird. There is also a Guggenmusik band called Biou'Z'Musik.

The arms use the colours of the city: yellow (gold) and black (sable) which are an allusion to yellow wine and dark forests.

| Arms of Arbois | Blazon: Azure, a pelican in her piety Argent, vulned Gules, nest Or. |

== Administration ==
List of Successive Mayors

| From | To | Name | Party |
|---|---|---|---|
| 2001 | 2008 | Raymond Page | UMP |
| 2008 | 2020 | Bernard Amiens | |
| 2020 | 2026 | Valérie Depierre | |

== Population ==
Historical population

| Year | Pop. | ±% p.a. |
|---|---|---|
| 1793 | 6,649 | — |
| 1800 | 6,414 | −0.51% |
| 1806 | 6,555 | +0.36% |
| 1821 | 6,424 | −0.13% |
| 1831 | 6,741 | +0.48% |
| 1836 | 7,131 | +1.13% |
| 1841 | 7,002 | −0.36% |
| 1846 | 6,958 | −0.13% |
| 1851 | 6,901 | −0.16% |
| 1856 | 6,007 | −2.74% |
| 1861 | 6,672 | +2.12% |
| 1866 | 5,895 | −2.45% |
| 1872 | 5,273 | −1.84% |
| 1876 | 5,027 | −1.19% |
| 1881 | 4,957 | −0.28% |
| 1886 | 4,666 | −1.20% |
| 1891 | 4,355 | −1.37% |
| 1896 | 4,240 | −0.53% |
| 1901 | 4,209 | −0.15% |

| Year | Pop. | ±% p.a. |
|---|---|---|
| 1906 | 4,093 | −0.56% |
| 1911 | 3,926 | −0.83% |
| 1921 | 3,475 | −1.21% |
| 1926 | 3,616 | +0.80% |
| 1931 | 3,681 | +0.36% |
| 1936 | 3,627 | −0.30% |
| 1946 | 3,457 | −0.48% |
| 1954 | 3,733 | +0.96% |
| 1962 | 3,960 | +0.74% |
| 1968 | 4,209 | +1.02% |
| 1975 | 4,089 | −0.41% |
| 1982 | 3,998 | −0.32% |
| 1990 | 3,900 | −0.31% |
| 1999 | 3,698 | −0.59% |
| 2007 | 3,487 | −0.73% |
| 2012 | 3,537 | +0.29% |
| 2017 | 3,336 | −1.16% |
| 2023 | 3,114 | −1.14% |

Source: EHESS and INSEE

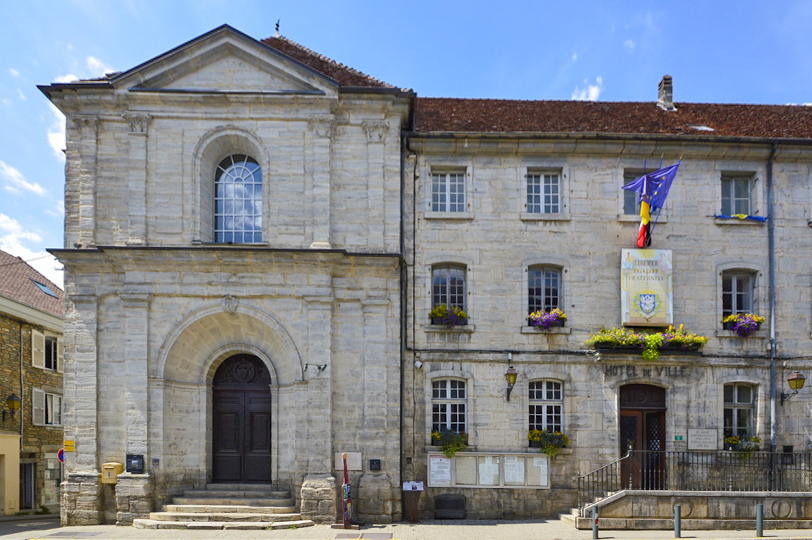
The Town Hall

== Economy ==
Arbois is a small rural town with a rich historical heritage and important advantages for agricultural activity such as viticulture, an industrial enterprise among the 10 largest in the department, and tourism based on its heritage and gastronomy.

There is, however, some hidden economic fragility with an aging population, sensitive industries at risk of relocation, a downturn in the diversity of shopping, and an overestimation of the value of property which tends to deter young households.

=== Agriculture ===
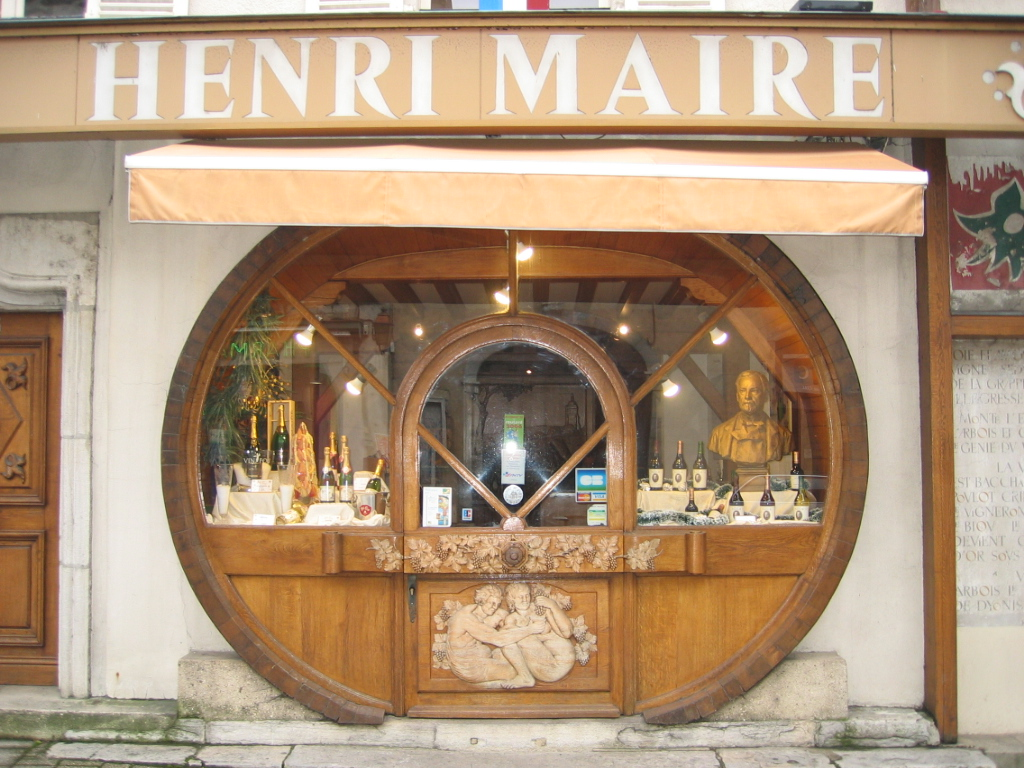
Henri Maire in Arbois

The area produces some of the best Jura wines, including vin jaune (yellow wine) and vin de Paille (straw wine), in the Arbois AOC; this is the dominant activity. Arbois has many wineries such as Henri Maire, the cooperative Fruitière vinicole d'Arbois, Rolet, Stéphane Tissot, Jacques Tissot, Domaine de la Pinte, Pascal Clairet, Michel Gahier, Frédéric Lornet, and Fumey-Chatelain.

The Arbois Appellation d'origine contrôlée (AOC) was introduced in 1936 and covers 13 communes on the hills and valley slopes surrounding the town. One of these, a small village named Pupillin, is particularly known for the quality of its wines, which come from a patchwork of vineyards planted on south-facing, limestone-rich slopes. Wines from these sites are sold as Arbois-Pupillin. Arbois wines are produced from around 2,100 acres (850ha) of vineyards, planted with Chardonnay, Savagnin, Poulsard (or Ploussard as it is known in the commune), Pinot Noir and Trousseau.

About 70% of Jura's red wines are produced under the Arbois name, along with about 30% of its whites.

Some bottles are labeled with the saying (in French): "Arbois wine: the more you drink, the more it goes right!". An old familiar song, the Tourdion is a song on the wines of Anjou or Arbois. It is also mentioned by Jacques Brel in his song Pour mon dernier repas (For my last meal) as well as by Hubert-Félix Thiéfaine in La cancoillotte (The cream cheese). In 1285 the Count of Chiny used to offer it to his guests during the Chauvency Tournament according to the troubadour Jacques Bretel who drank it in the company of Henri de Briey.

Arbois also has dairy farms (Montbéliarde and goat breeds) in the AOC of Comté and Morbier.

=== Industry ===
Industries other than wine contribute to the wealth of the commune including Bost-Garnache Industries (Stanley/Facom Group) which manufactures screwdrivers, SIOBRA who do zinc injection moulding, and CIFC who build industrial wood framing.

== Culture and heritage ==
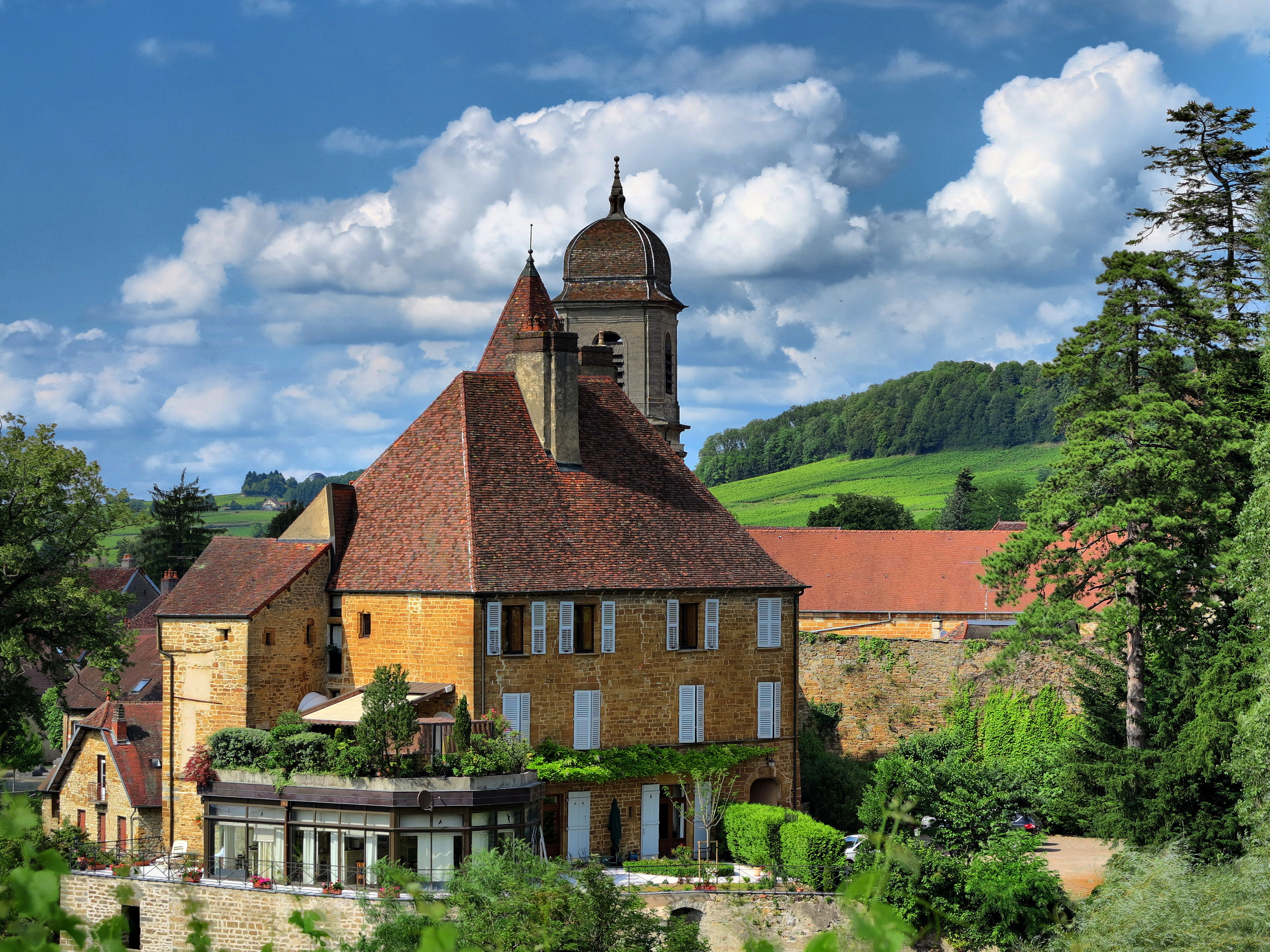
The Chateau Bontemps

=== Civil heritage ===
The commune has a number of buildings and structures that are registered as historical monuments:

- The Brand consorts House (13th century)
- The Hydro-Electric Power Station (20th century)
- The Delort House (18th century)
- The Hotel de Broissia (19th century)
- The Fruitière vinicole d'Arbois (1818)
- The Béchet Mill at 2 Avenue Pasteur (18th century)
- The Chateau of Verreux at 2 Rue de Verreux (18th century)
- The Chateau Bontemps (16th century)
- The Gloriette Tower (16th century). The Tour Gloriette (Gloriette Tower) was built in the 13th century together with the Tour Velfaux (Vellefaux), and integrated into the Château Pécauld (Pecaud). The Gloriette was one of the principal elements of the city's ramparts which stretched for some 1200 metres. It was badly damaged in 1503 when the Cuisance overflowed its banks. With a height of 17 metres and a square base 11 metres on each side, the current tower was restored at the beginning of the 16th century. Although the city was attacked by several armies, the tower itself was never attacked.
- Louis Pasteur's House (18th century). It was the only house the scientist owned. The house is preserved in its original state, exactly as it was when Louis Pasteur was alive with his private laboratory. The Pasteur House contains many items that are registered as historical objects:
  - A Bathtub (19th century)
  - A Tabletop Still (19th century)
  - A Painting: Virgin and Child (15th century)
  - 3 Daguerreotypes (19th century)
  - An Inkwell (19th century)
  - A Bon Marché box (19th century)
  - A Drawing: The Funerals of Atala (19th century)
  - A Drawing: Bust of a young woman (1843)
  - A Plate: Pasteur born at Dole (19th century)
  - A Painting: A clear night at Aiguebelette Lake (19th century)
  - A Statue: Christ (18th century)
  - A Praxinoscope (1879)
  - A Gypsum Plate (19th century)
  - 3 Chairs (18th century)
  - A Commode (18th century)
- The Palace of Justice (Law Courts) contains a Bronze Clock (1819) which is registered as an historical object.
- The Château Pécaud and Velfaux Tower (11th century). The Château Pécauld was built in the 11th and 14th centuries and once belonged to the Dukes of Burgundy. It now houses a small museum dedicated to wine growing and production. By the 13th century, it was part the defences of the city. Its large circular tower is known as the Tour de Velfaux after the tower's owner, Guillaume de Velfaux, who sold it to Nicolas Perrenot de Granvelle, the father of Antoine Perrenot de Granvelle. De Grenvelle added to the house proper at the beginning of the 16th century, at the end of which the Pecauld family acquired it. During the French Revolution the house was nationalized and sold in 1826 to the city of Arbois. Later, the Institute of Wines of Jura restored it.

Other sites of Interest

- The Hôtel d'Achey (17th century), then became Sarret de Grozon (19th century), Grande Rue, today an Art Museum which displays, among others, the works of Gustave Courbet;
- The Fountain of Lions (19th century), Place de la Liberté;
- A Fountain (19th century), Rue de Courcelles;
- The 'Saut de la Cuisance (Cuisance Falls), near the bridge on Rue de l'Hôtel de ville;
- The Arbois Wine-growing area (partially replanted in the 19th century);
- The Belvédère de l'Hermitage (20th century).
- Les Planches Cave (Grotte des Planches) (5 km away)
- The Hotel-Dieu contains three items that are registered as historical objects:
  - A Painting: Saint Antoine (17th century)
  - A Painting: Saint François (17th century)
  - A Painting: Saint Marthe (17th century)
- The Hospital contains several religious and other items that are registered as historical objects:
  - A Chalice with its Paten (18th century)
  - A Casket for Holy Oil (18th century)
  - A Wooden Clock (18th century)
  - A Bronze Mortar (17th century)
  - 70 Ceramic Pharmaceutical Jars (17th century)
  - A Bronze Clock (1738)
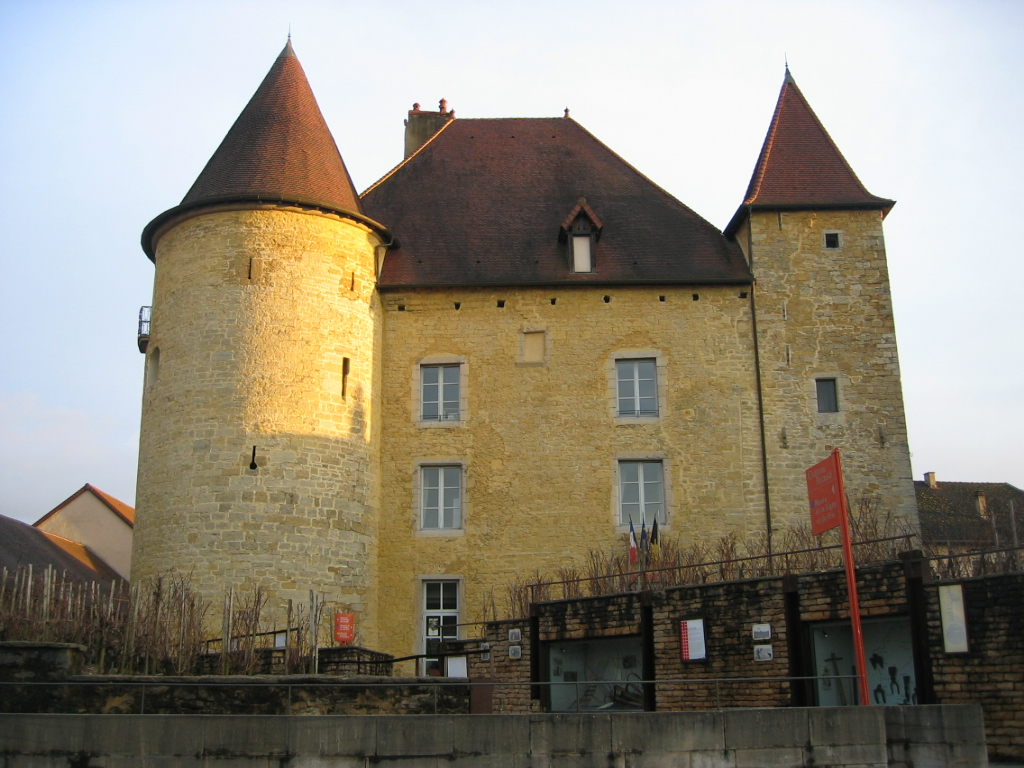
The Chateau Pecauld

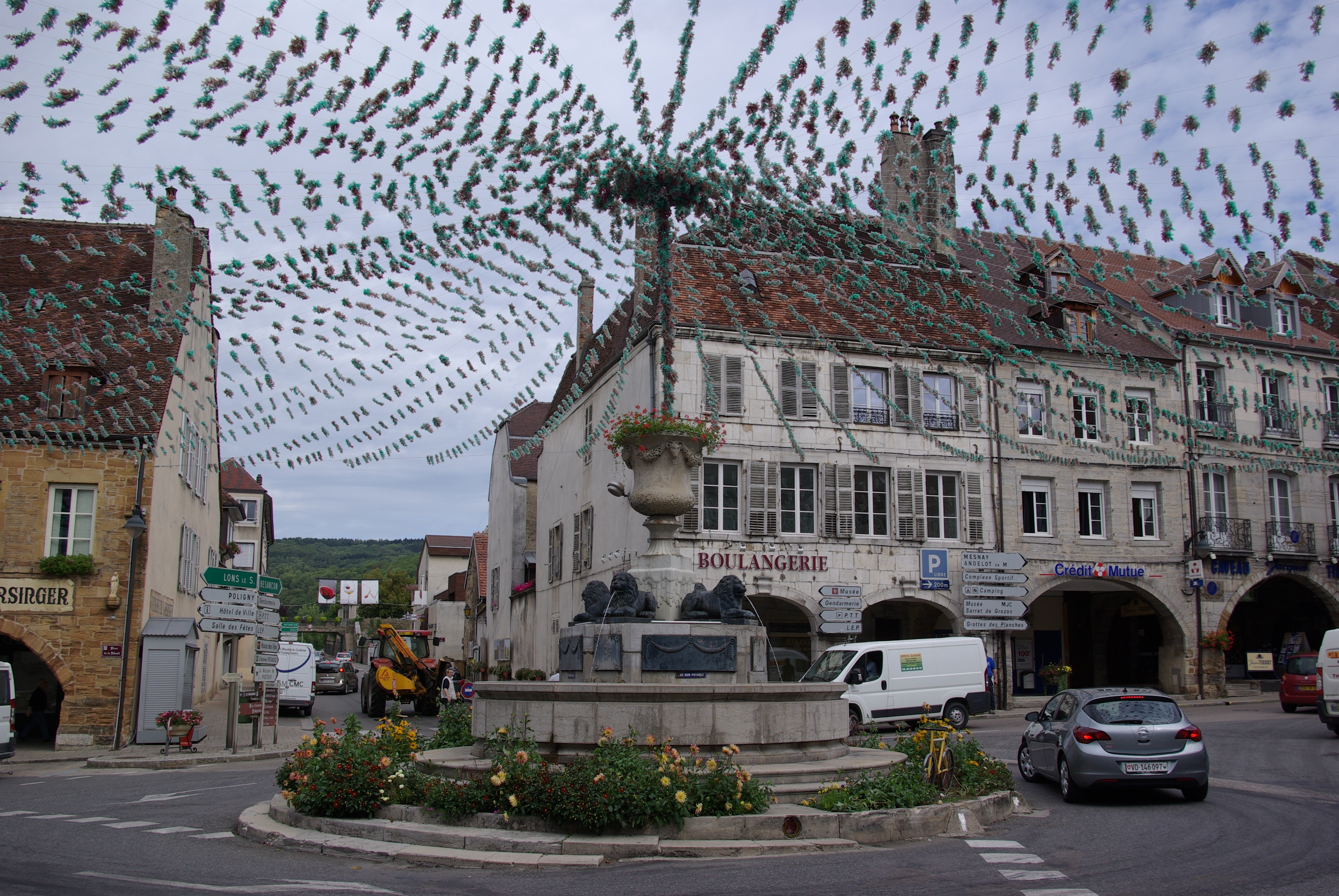
Liberty Square

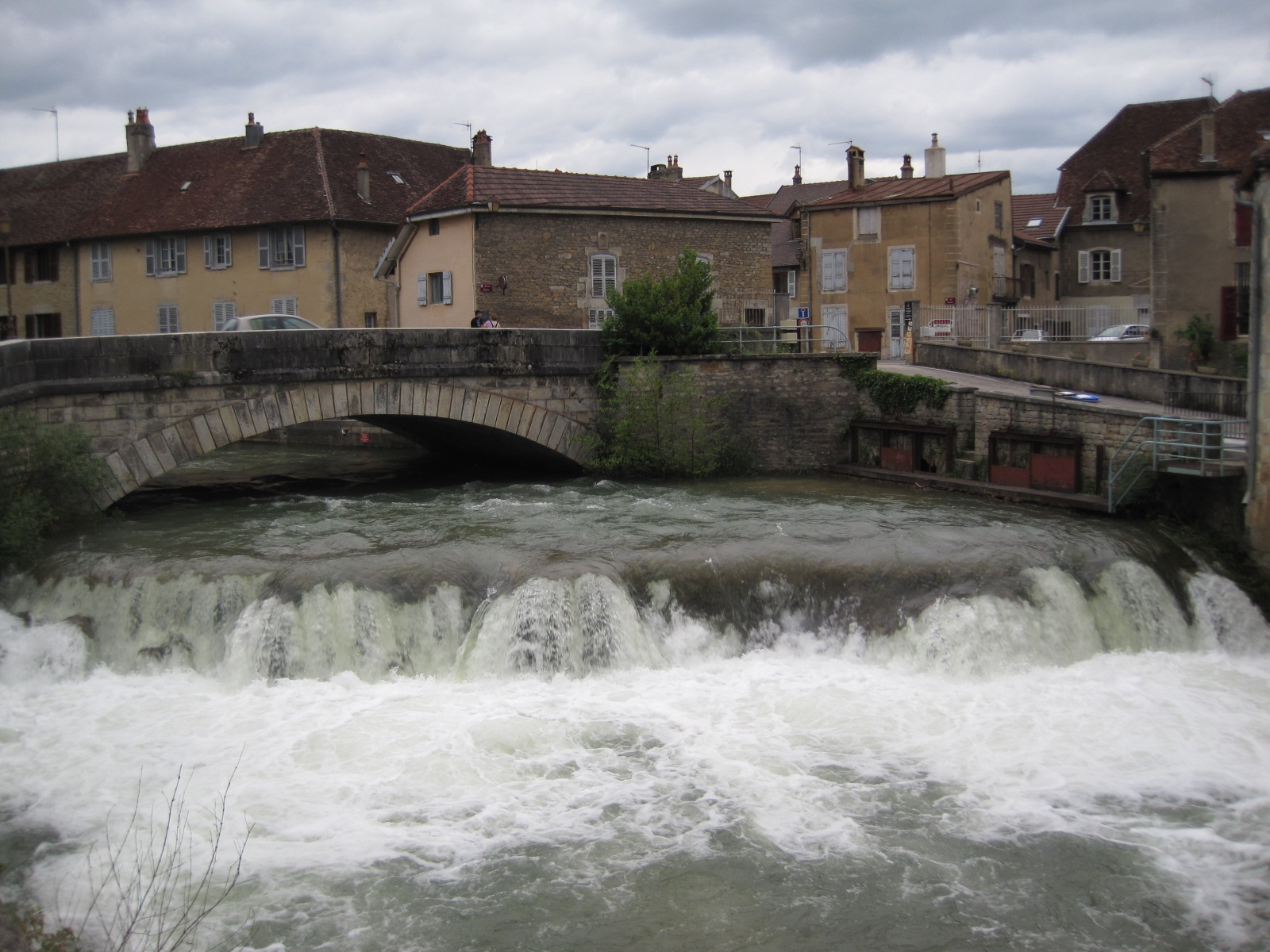
The Cuisance at Arbois

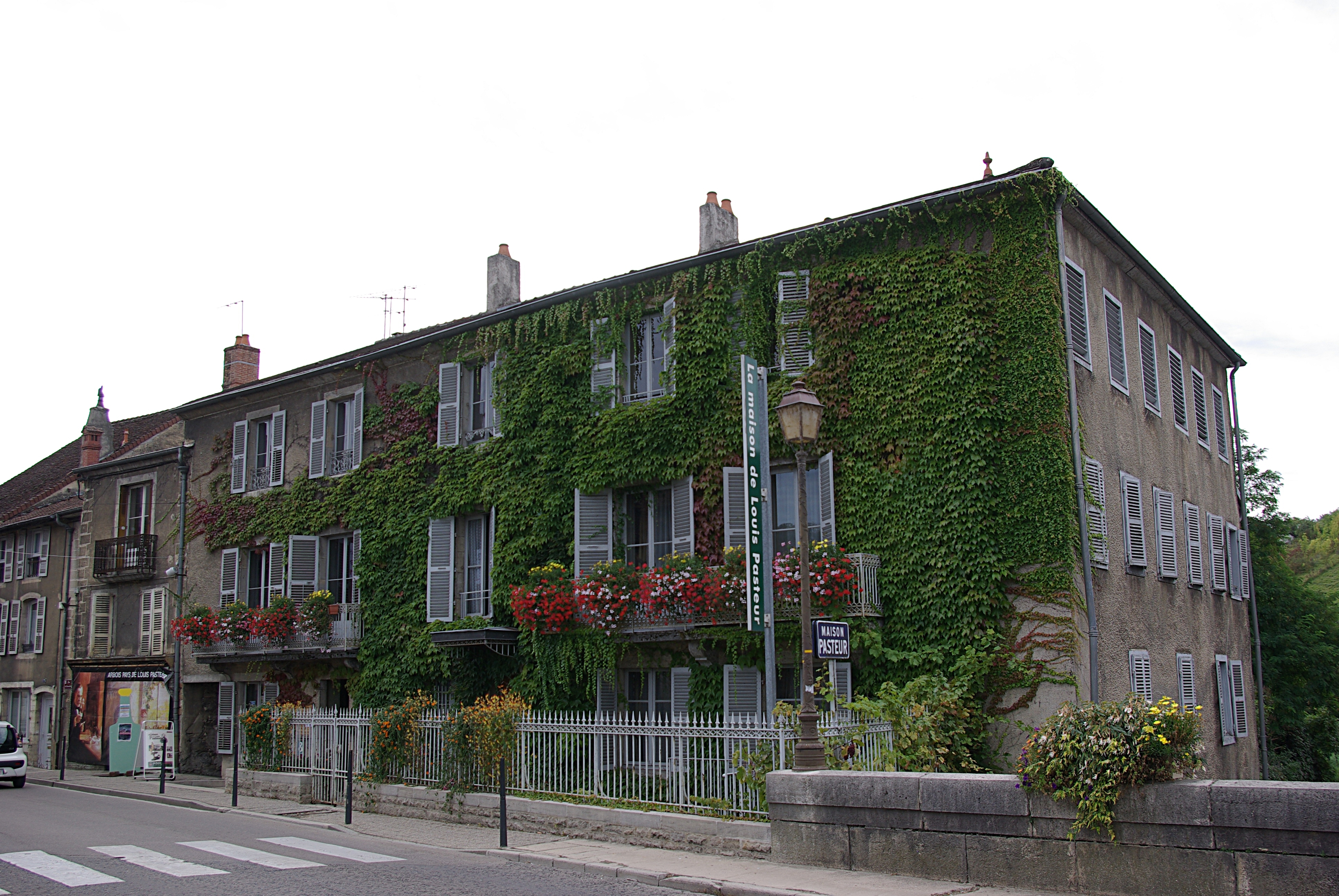
The Louis Pasteur House

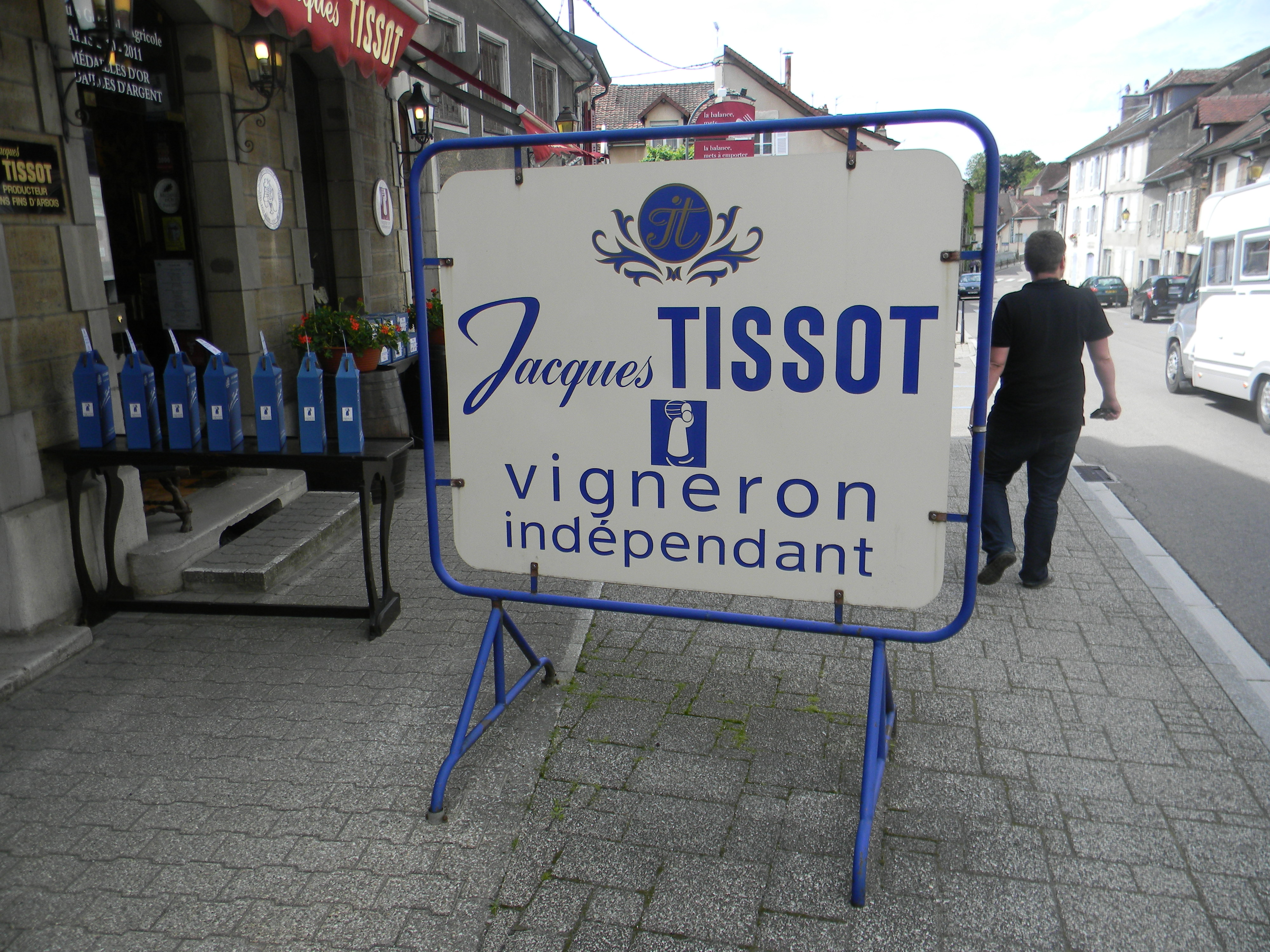
Tissot Wine

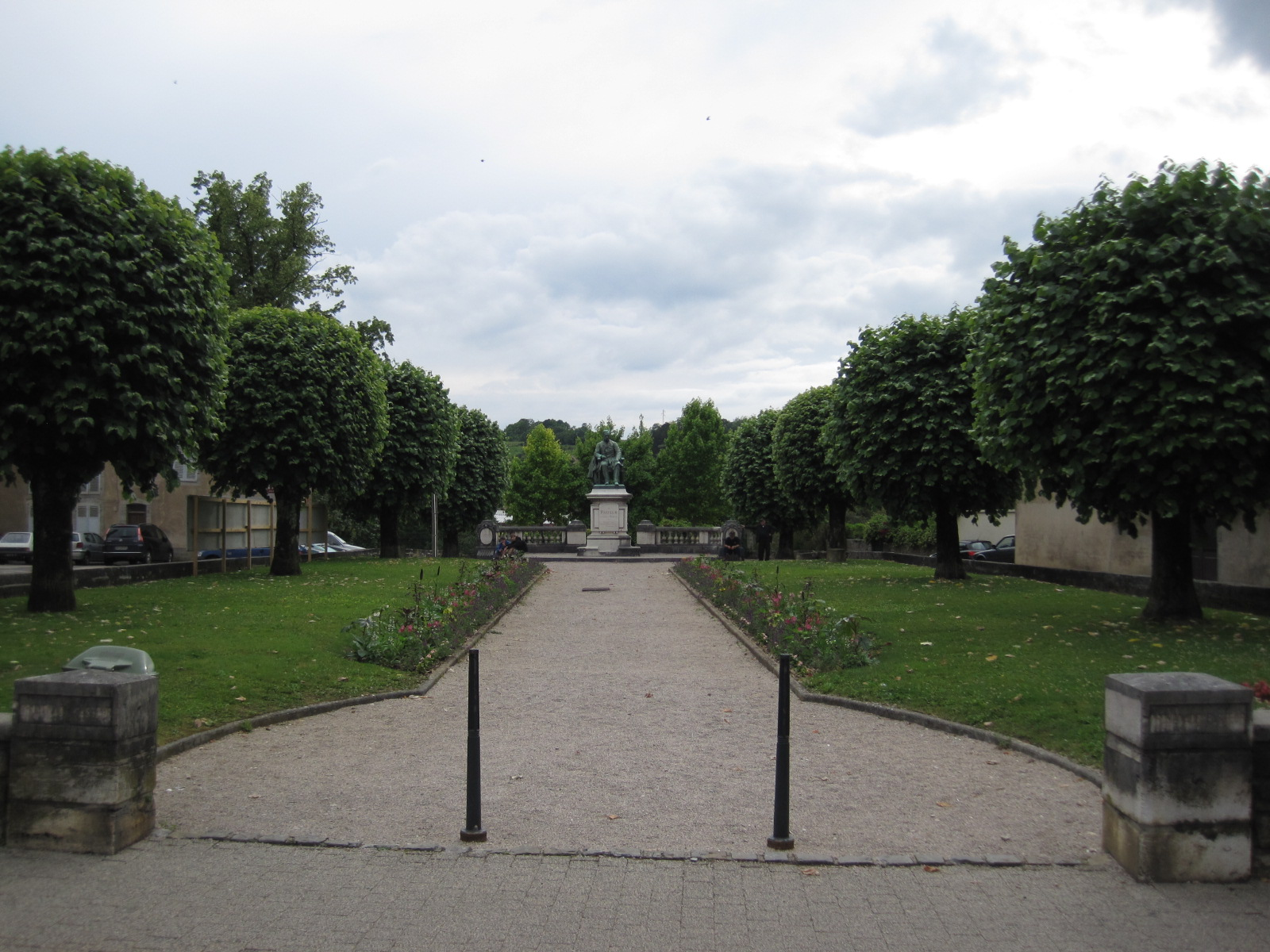
Entrance to the Square Louis Pasteur

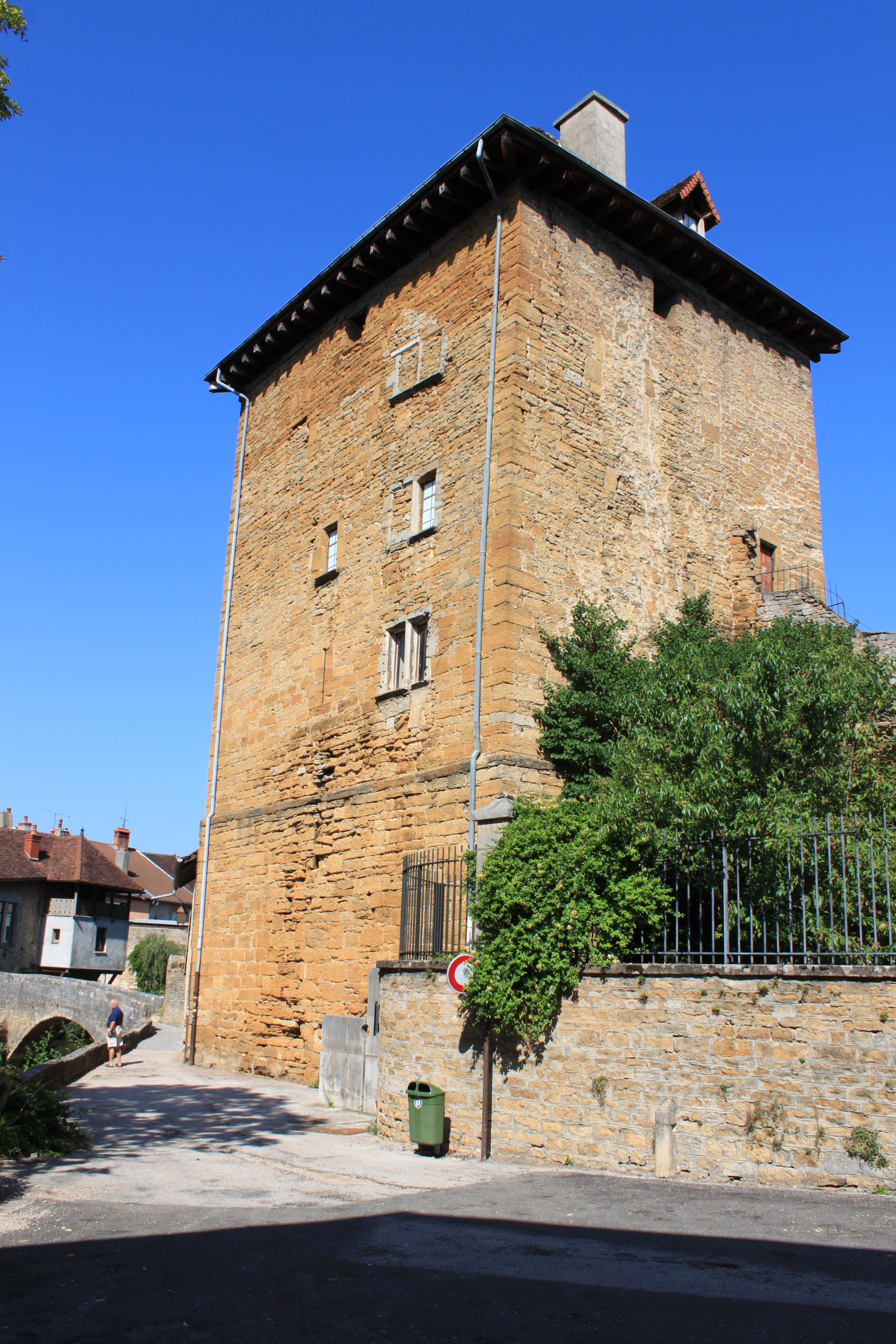
The Gloriette Tower

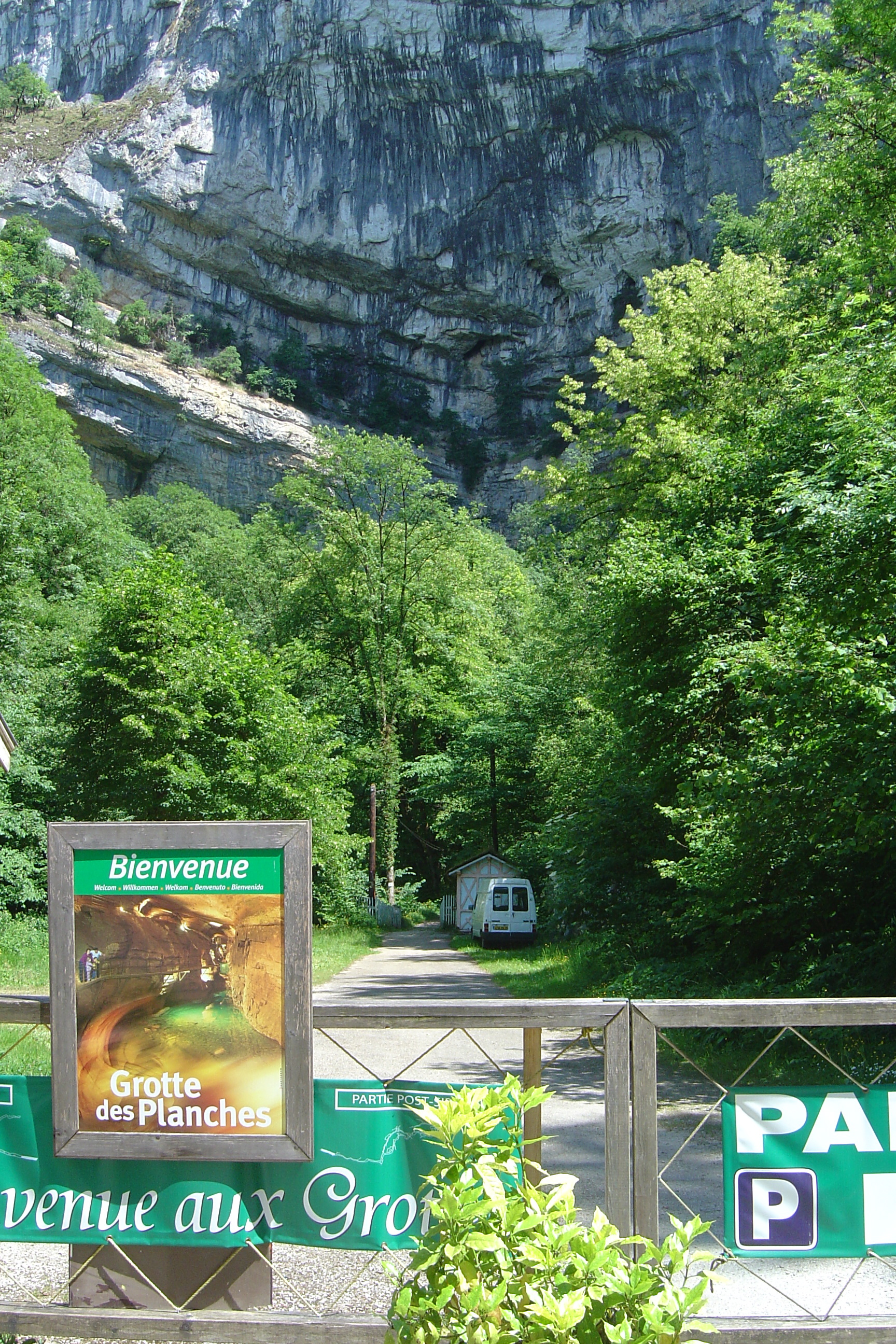
Les Planches Caves

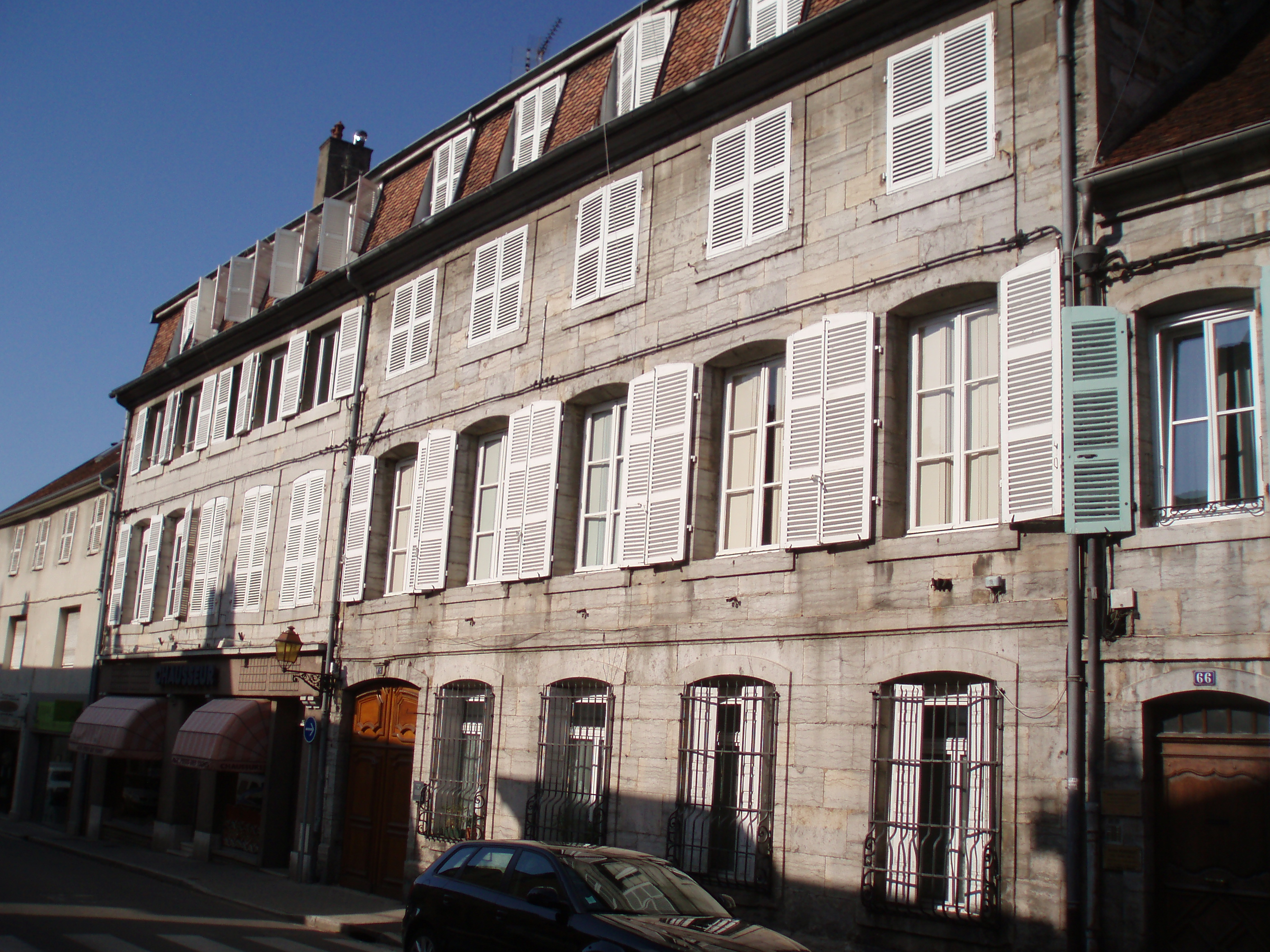
The Hotel de Brossia

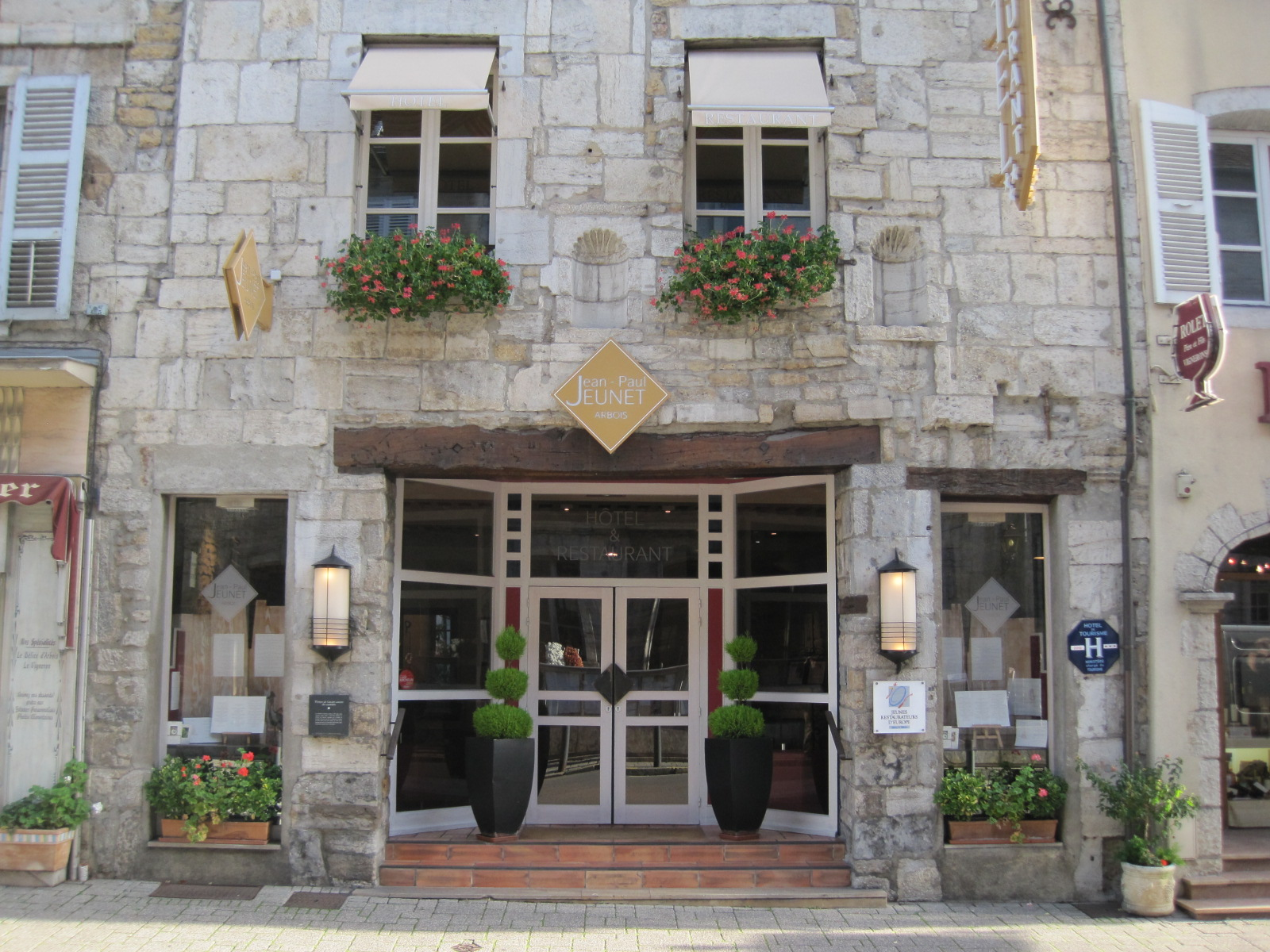
The Maison Jeunet Restaurant

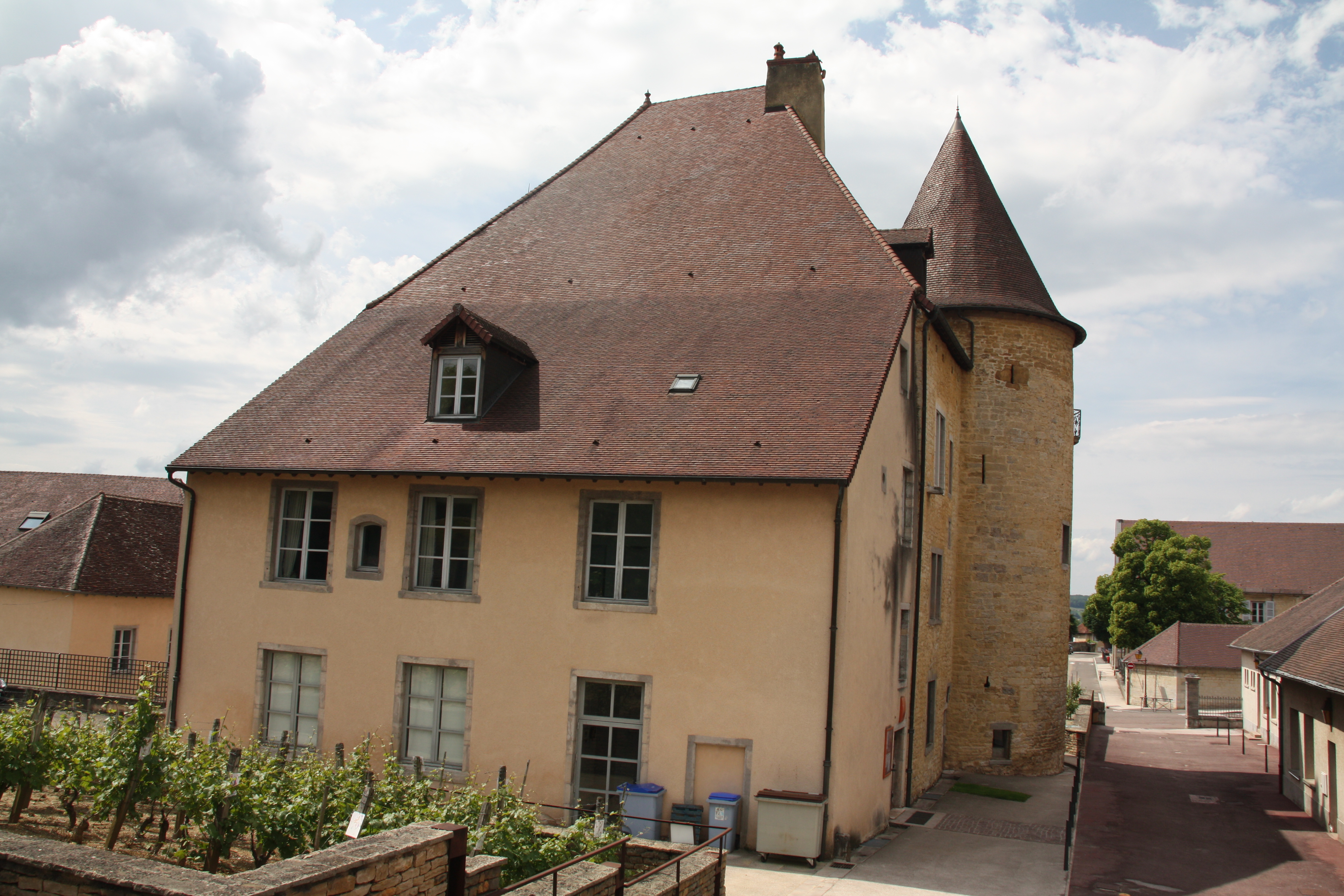
The Wine Museum

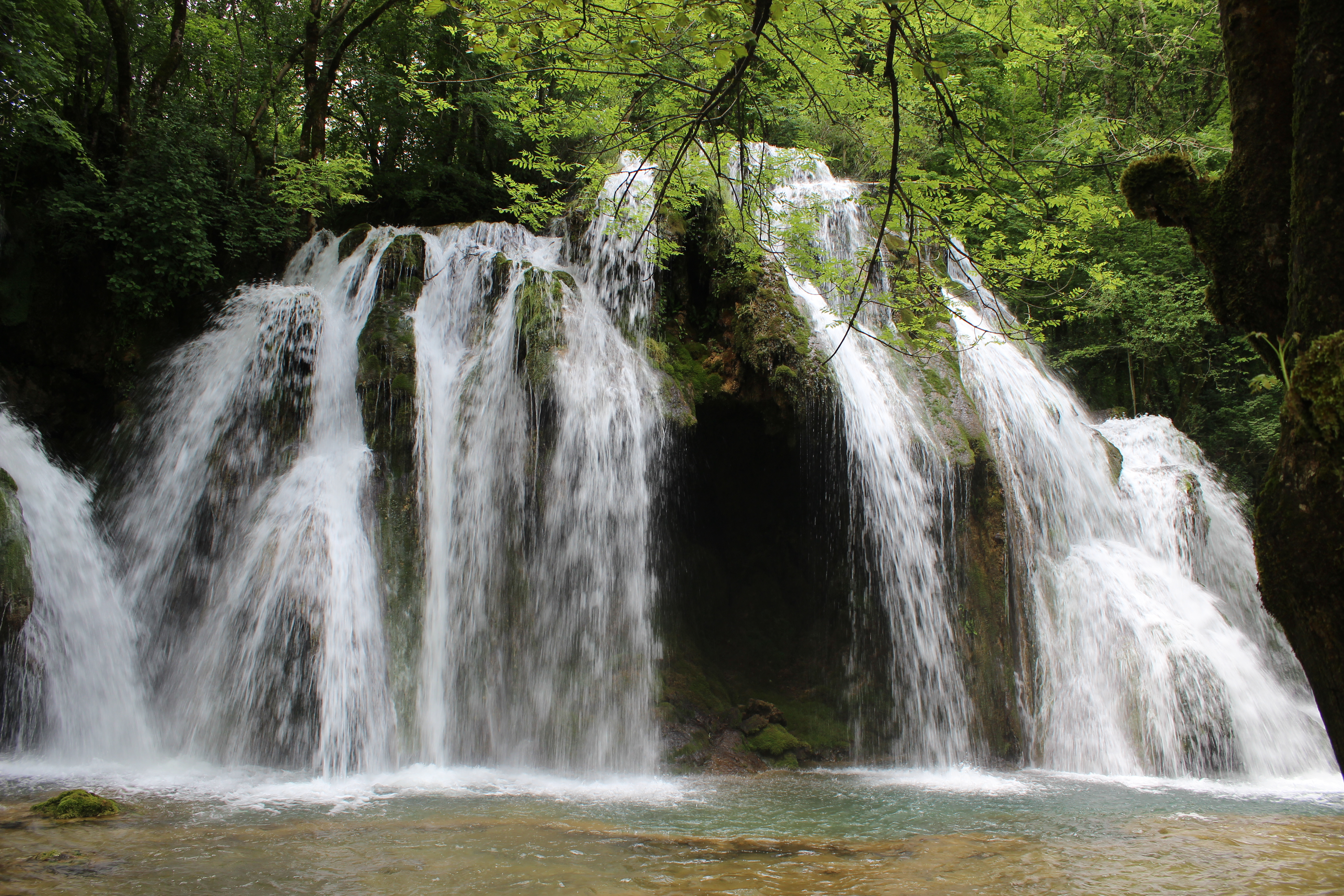
The Cascade des Tufs waterfall

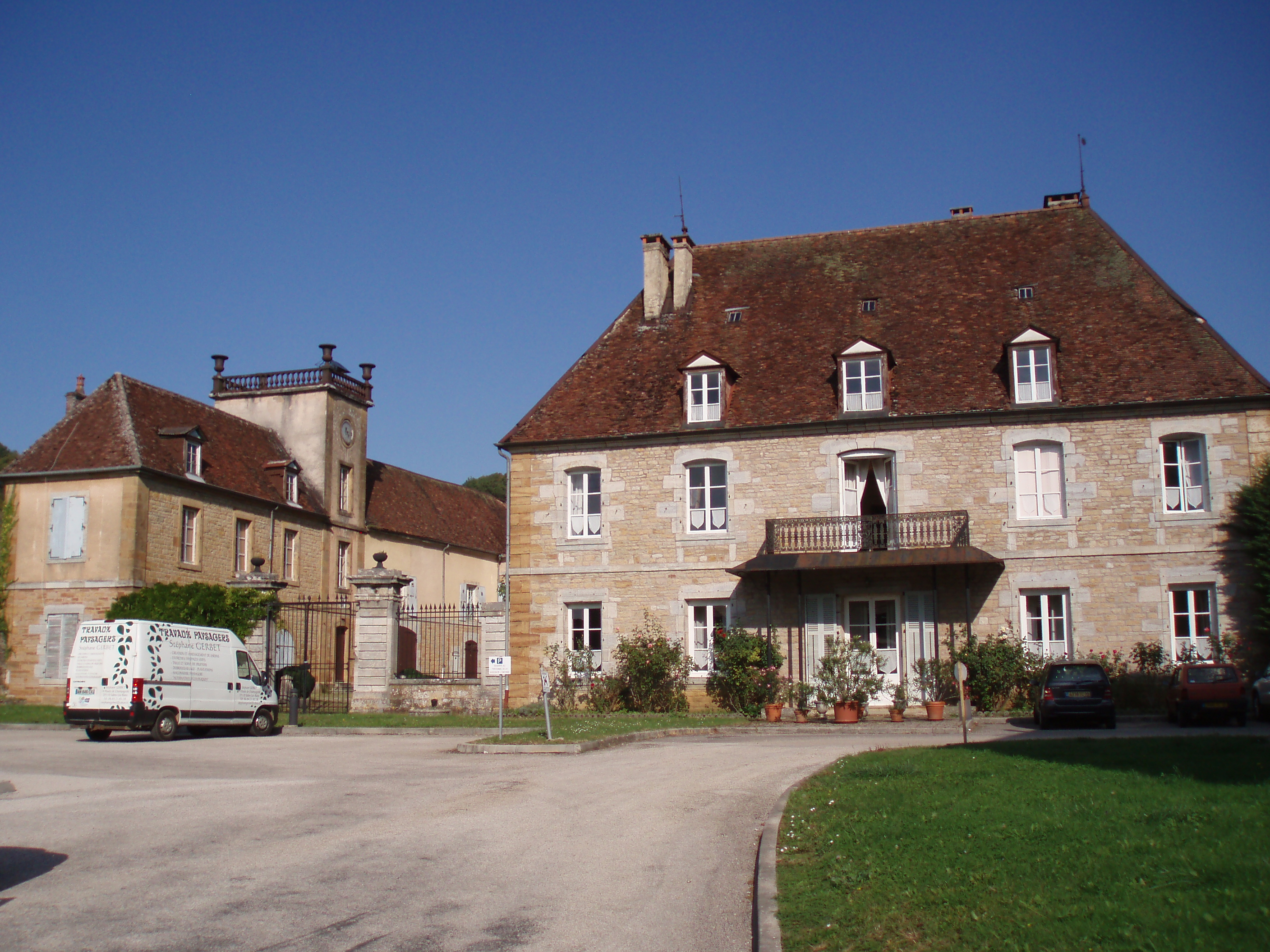
The Chateau Delort

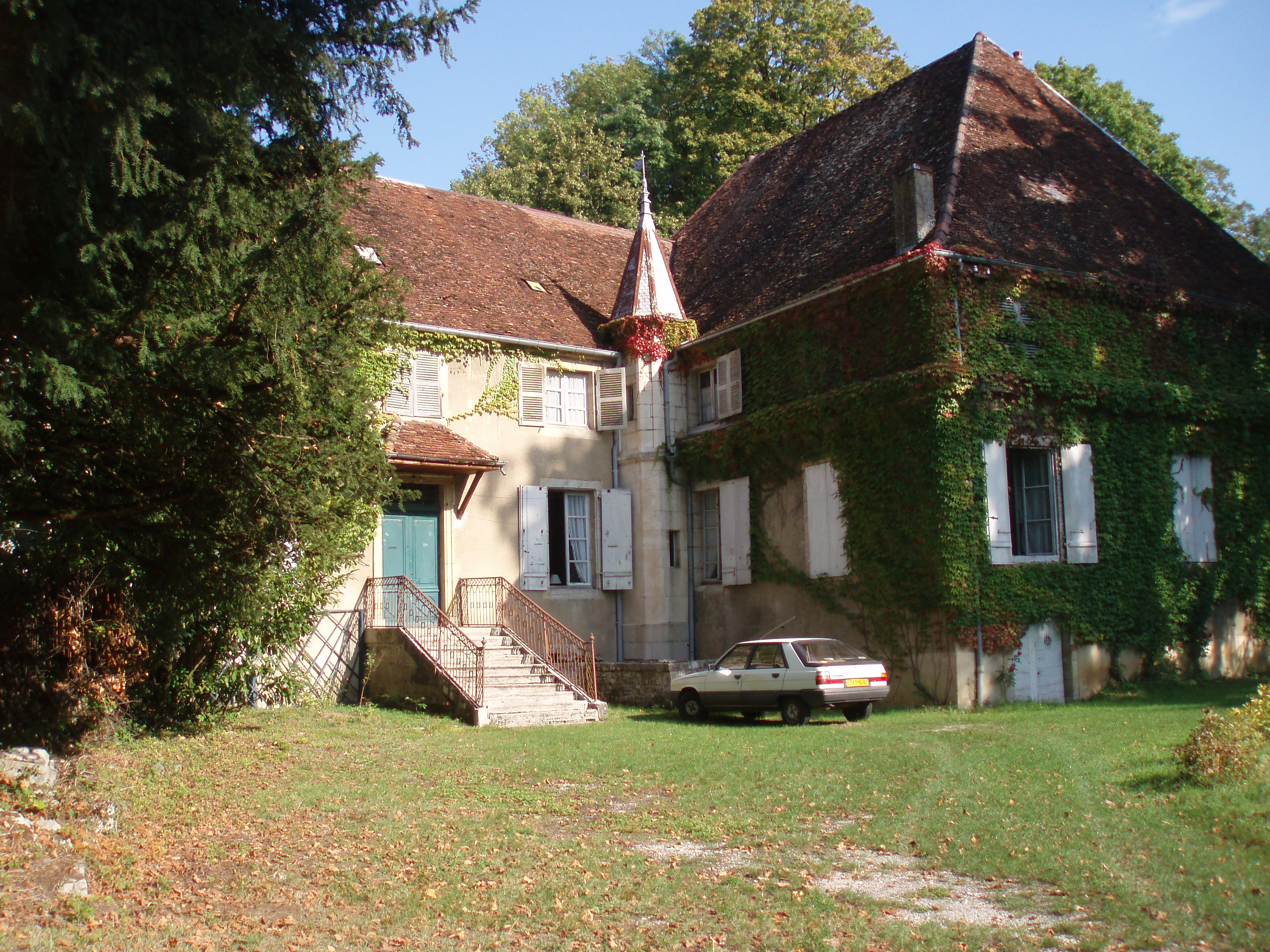
The Chateau de Verreux

=== Religious heritage ===
The commune has several religious buildings and structures that are registered as historical monuments:

- The old Ursuline Convent (18th century)
- The Church of Saint-Just (11th century) The Church of Saint-Just has a 12th-century nave, a 13th-century vault, a 16th-century chancel, and a 17th-century church tower. The organ is rated as a historic monument and was restored in 1985. The church contains a very large number of items that are registered as historical objects.

Other religious sites of interest

- The old Collegiate College of Notre-Dame (14th-18th centuries), Rue Notre-Dame, converted into a wheat market in 1802 and today a Cultural Centre;
- The Chapel of Notre-Dame Libératrice (17th century) at l'Hermitage (Avenue Pasteur). The Church has a group of items that is registered as an historical object:
  - An Altar, Retable, Altar seating, 2 Credenzas, and a frame (17th century)
- The Presbytery contains several items that are registered as historical objects:
  - A Painting: The Nativity (16th century)
  - A Pitcher and Basin (18th century)
  - A Statuette/Reliquary: The Immaculate Virgin (1854)
  - A Cross: Christ on the Cross (18th century)
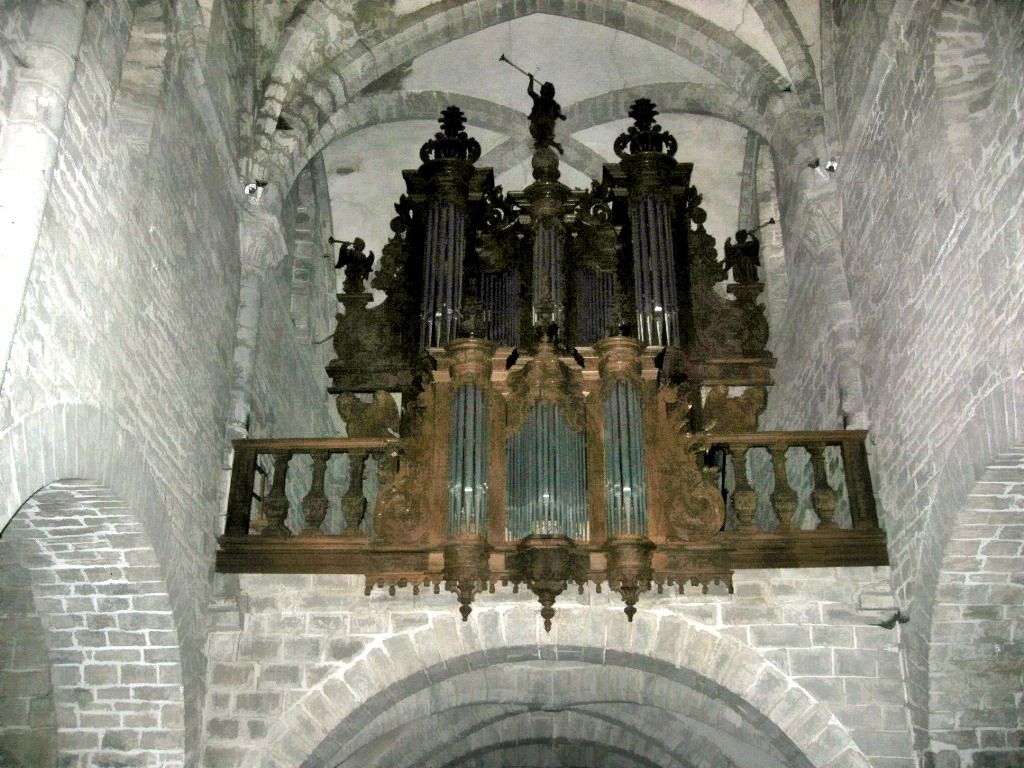
The Organ in Saint-Just

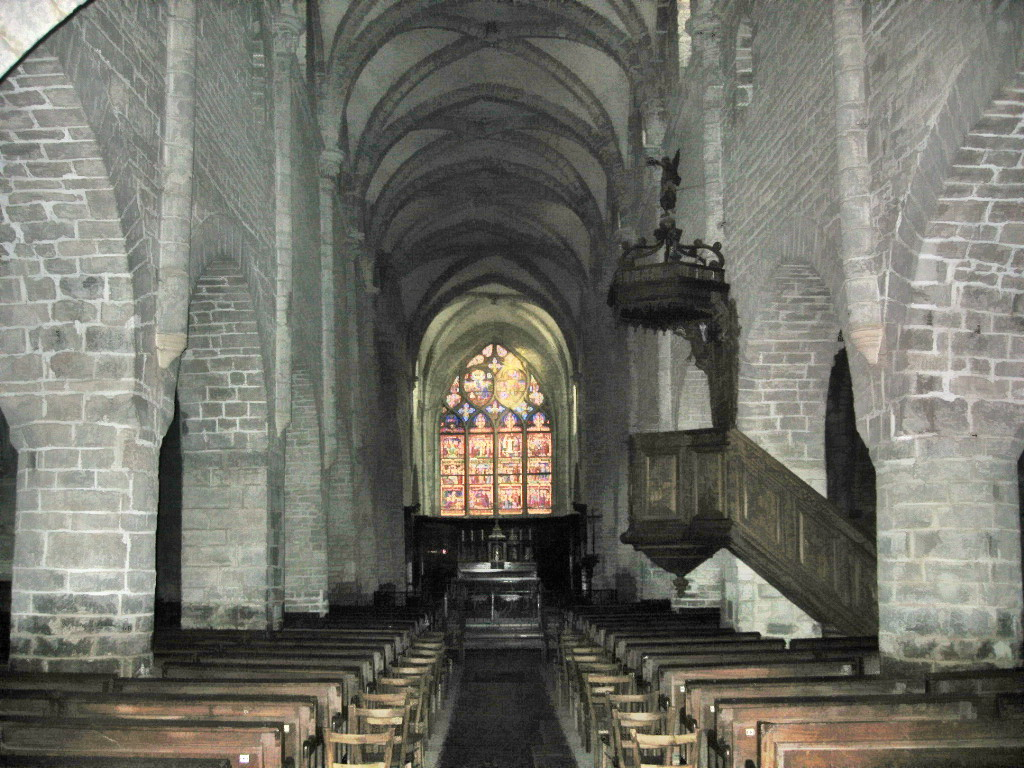
The Nave of Saint-Just

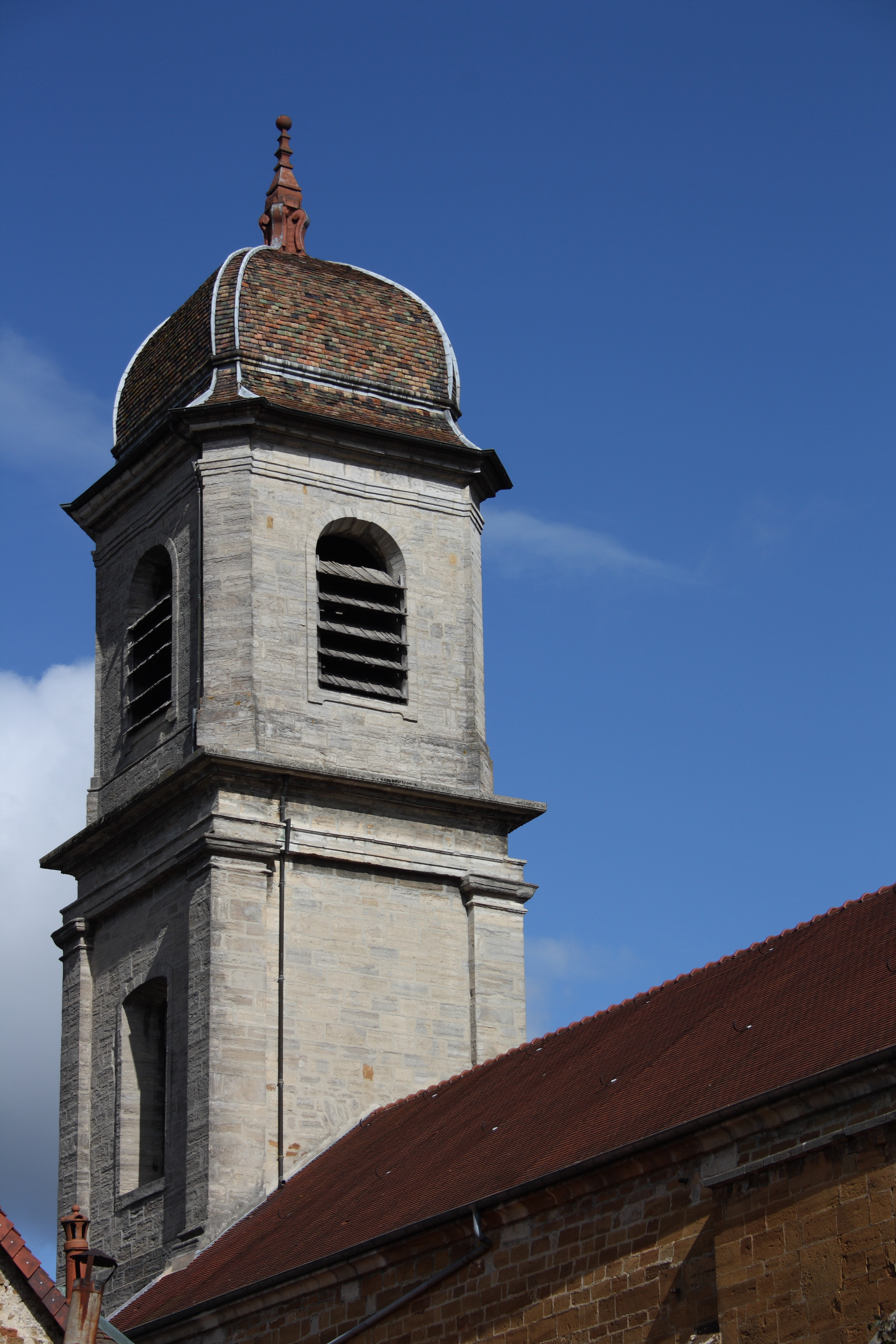
The Collegiate of Notre-Dame

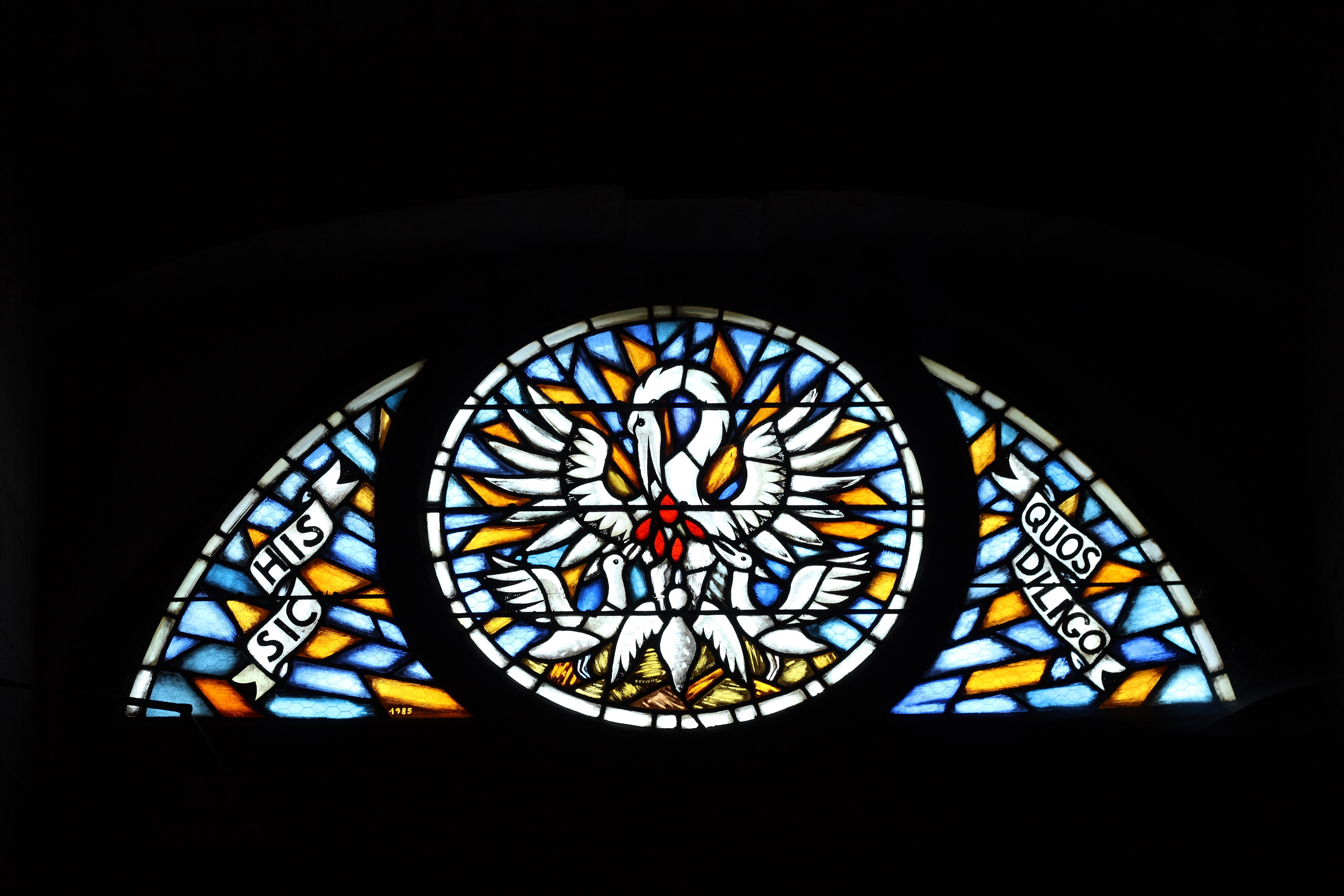
Stained glass window in the Church of Saint-Just

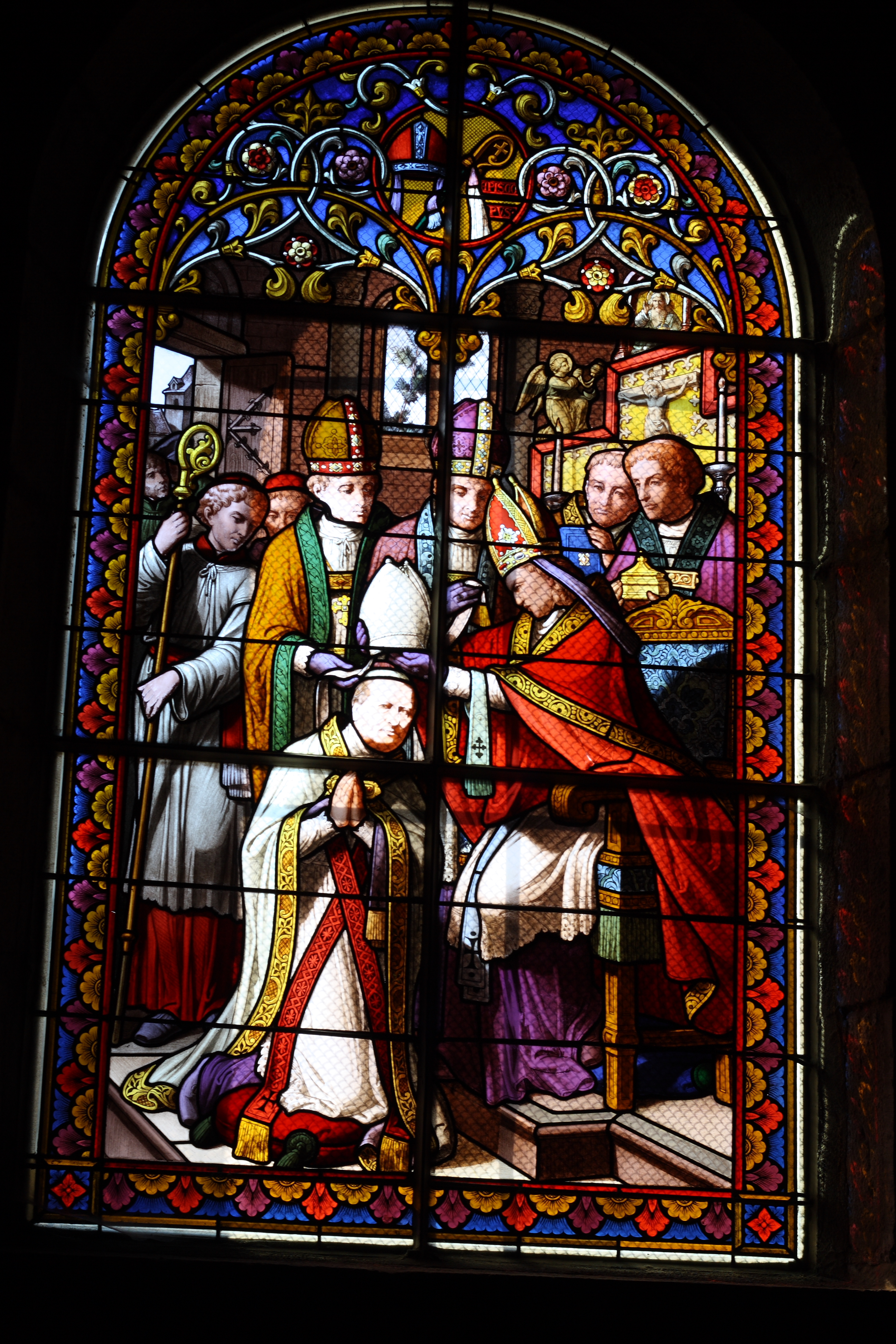
Stained glass window in the Church of Saint-Just

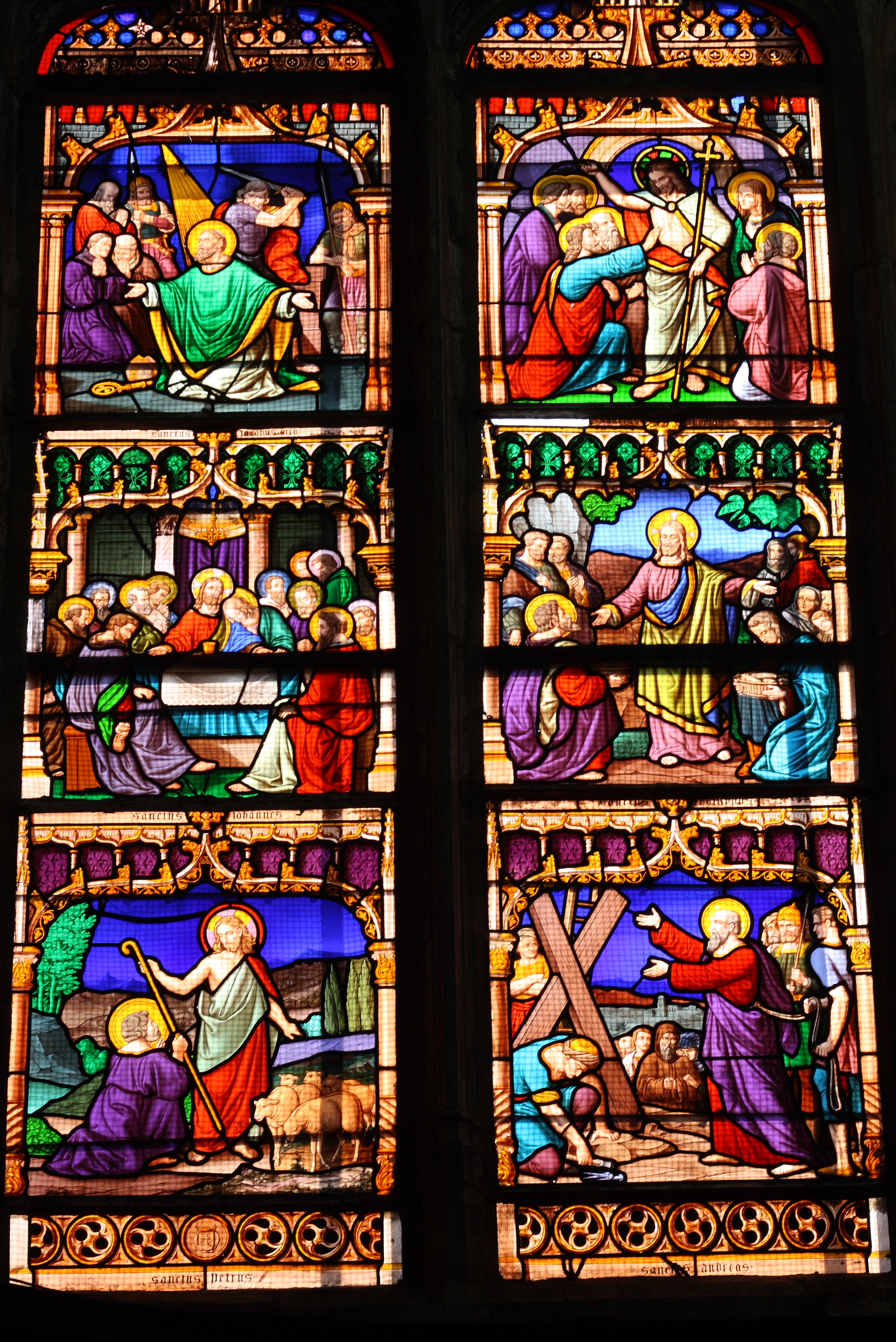
Stained glass window in the Church of Saint-Just

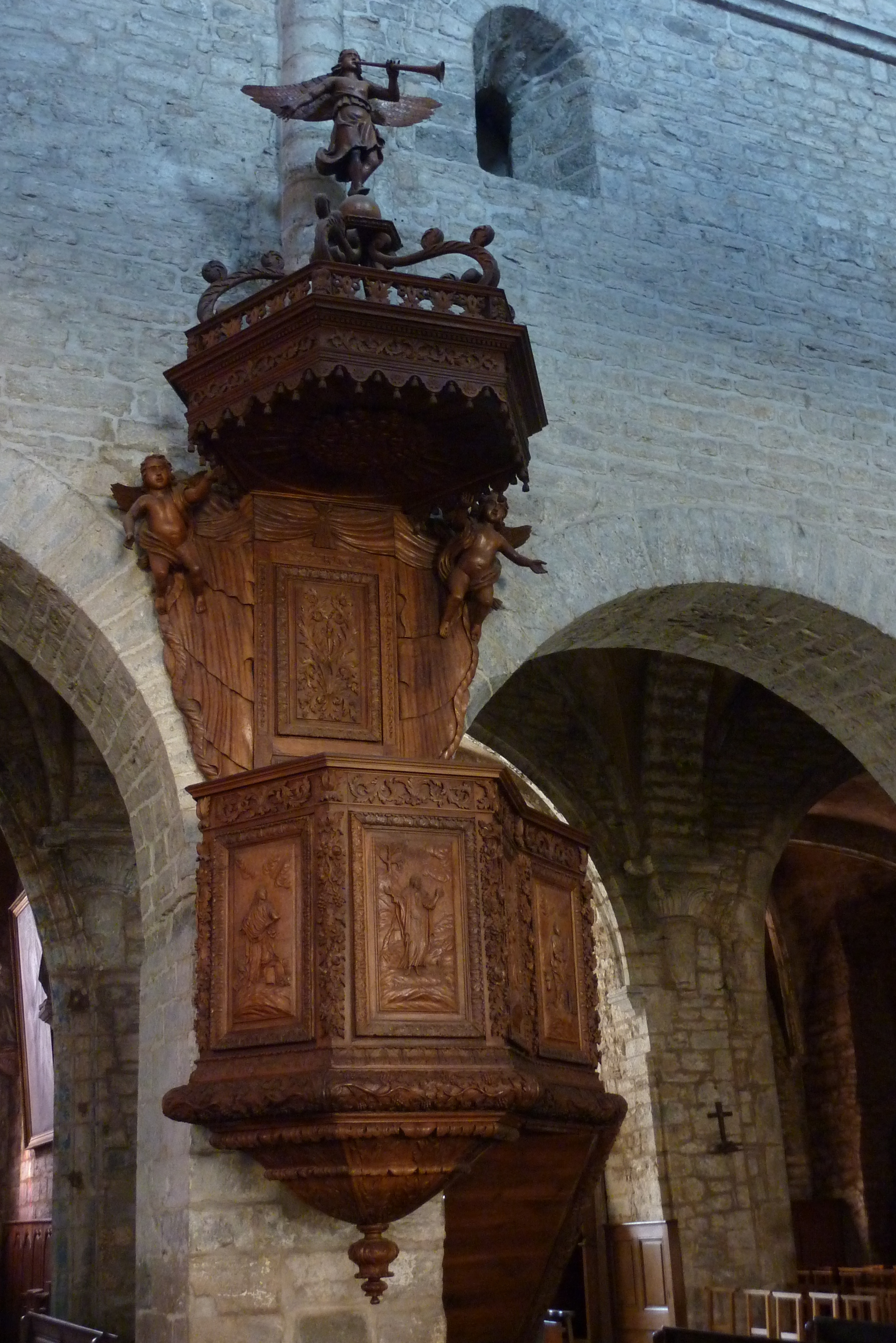
Pulpit in the Church of Saint-Just

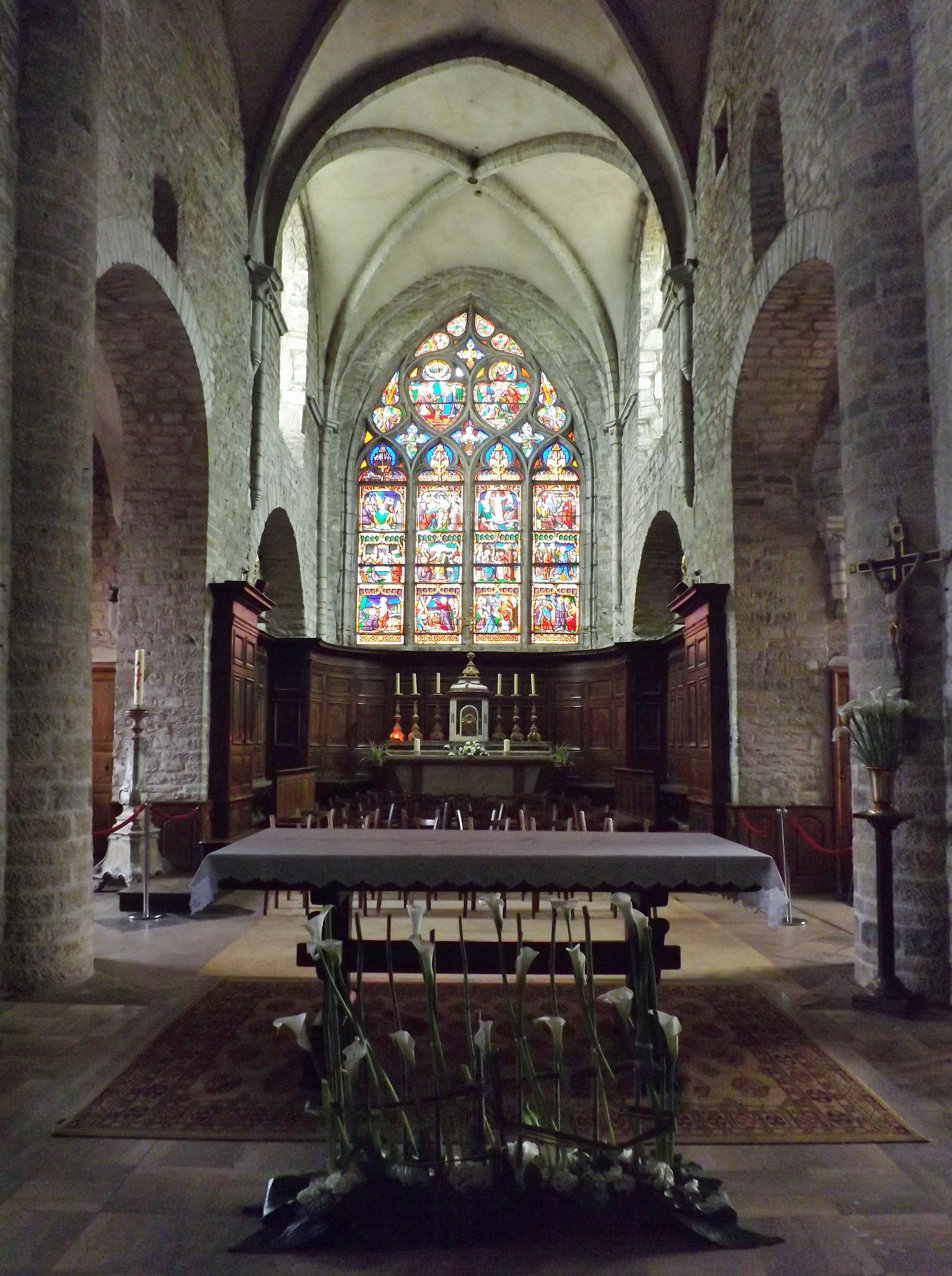
The Altar in Saint-Just

== Personalities ==
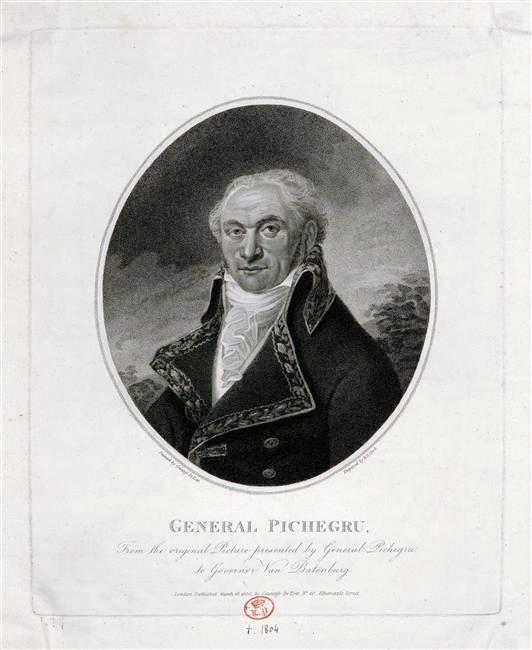
Jean-Charles Pichegru

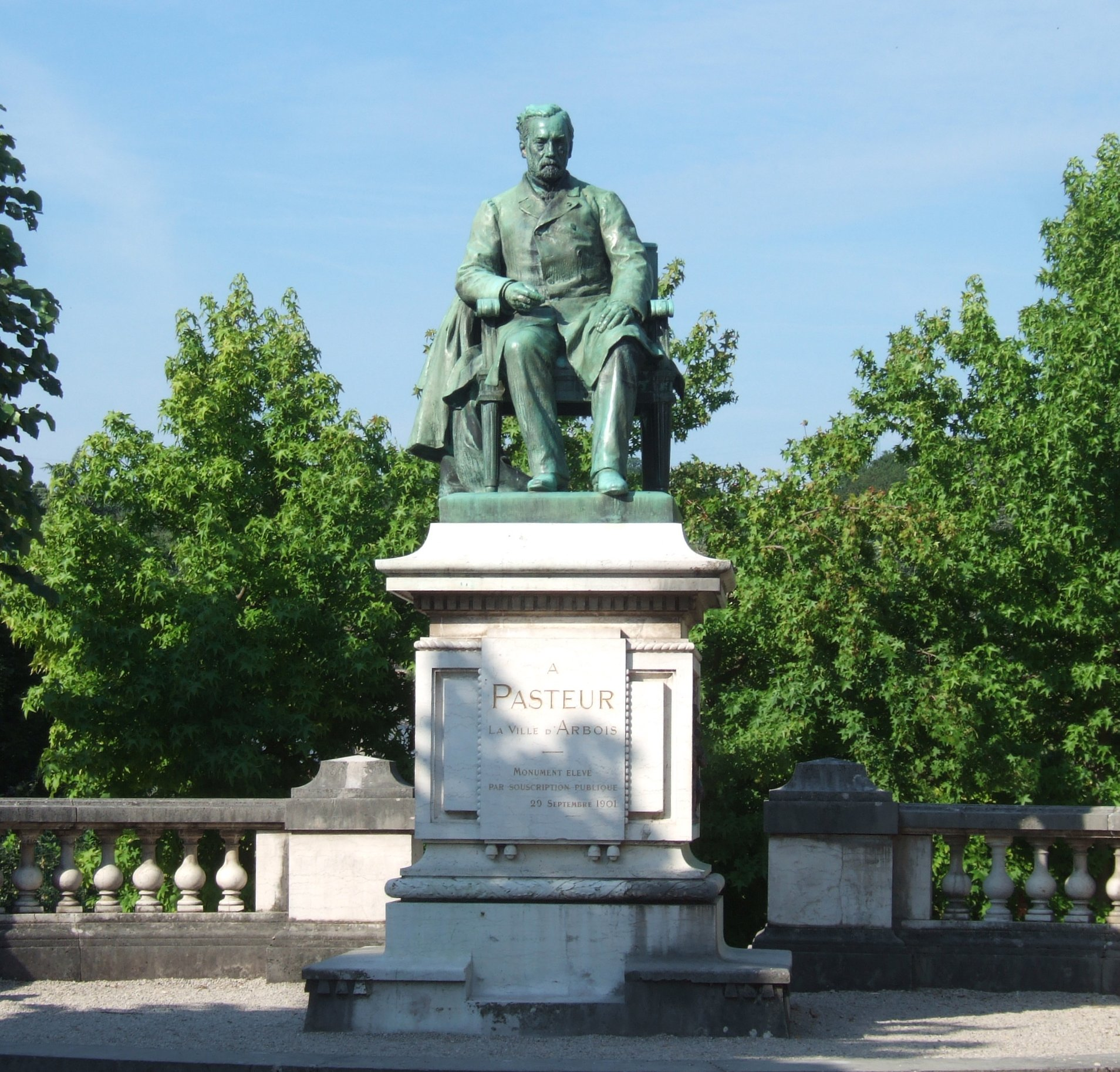
Monument to Louis Pasteur in Arbois

=== Born in Arbois ===
- Jean Vuillemin, Doctor and poet from the 16th century;
- Joseph Morel (?-1595), Captain of the County, Defender of Arbois during the siege by troops of French General Armand de Gontaut-Biron;
- Jean Étienne Joseph Baud (1734-1803), sub-prefect of Saint-Claude;
- Jean Étienne Baron (1736-1803), sub-prefect of Saint-Claude;
- Pierre Bouvenot (1748-1833), Magistrate, President of the Court of Arbois;
- Jean-Baptiste Courvoisier (1749-1803), Lawyer at the Parliament of Franche-Comté;
- Pierre Claude Bousson (1752-1845), Captain of the 3rd regiment of Dragoons and Knight of the Order of Saint Louis;
- Ignace François Bousson (1759-1825), General and Noble of the Empire, Knight of the Legion of Honour;
- Jean-Charles Pichegru (1761-1804), General, Commander in Chief of the commandant en chef de l'Army of the Rhine, MP for Jura;
- François Guinchard (1764-?), Captain of the Army;
- Jean-Antoine David (1767-1799), General of Brigade;
- Jacques-Antoine-Adrien Delort (1773-1848), General and Noble of the Empire;
- Charles Anne Joseph Domet de Mont (1777-1848), Soldier, Geologist, Councillor for Jura, and Knight of the Legion of Honour;
- Charles Victor Barbier (1787-1860), Captain of the Army;
- Claude Charles Joseph Gabriel Jolliton (1774-1836), Captain, Knight of the Legion of Honour;
- Jean-Pierre Jarre (1775-1856), Captain, Knight of the Legion of Honour;
- Claude François Boisson (1784-1836), Adjutant to the 4th Regiment of Hussars, Saint Helena Medal;
- Jean-François Saillard (1785-1839), Captain, Knight of the Legion of Honour and the Order of Saint-Louis;
- François-Joseph Noir (1787-?), Sergeant in the Old Guard, Saint Helena Medal;
- Anne Claude Belon d'Aligny (?-1834), Noble of the Empire;
- Auguste Napoléon Parandier (1804-1905), Engineer, Inspector-General of Bridges and Dykes;
- Alphonse Joseph Charles de Moréal Brevans (1823-?), artist-painter and designer;
- Auguste Pointelin (1839-1933), painter-landscape gardener;
- Jules Viennet, sculptor in the 19th century;
- Ernest Caroillon (1861-?), cleric and historian;
- Emmanuel Templeux (1871-1957), artist-painter;
- Joseph Sylvestre Sauget (1871-1955), botanist;
- André Baud (1879-1950), politician;
- Charles Brune (1891-1956), politician;
- Jean Badré (1913-2001), Officer in the French Army then Priest and Bishop, decorated with the Croix de Guerre, the Resistance Medal, and the Legion of Honour;
- Gabriel Girard (1920-1944), a maquisard who participated in an attack on the German police on 14 March 1944, arrested on 26 March, condemned to death on 30 May, and executed on 1 June at the Citadel of Besançon;
- François Chambelland (1923-1941), resistance fighter, arrested on 1 March 1941 and shot on 18 September at the Citadel of Besançon;
- Jean-Luc Bouilleret (1953-), Bishop of Besançon;
- Jean-Paul Jeunet (1954-), Chef at Arbois (2 Michelin Stars);
- Yves Gravel (-), Painter

=== Residents ===
- Jean-Baptiste Patrauld (1751-1817), born at Ray-sur-Saône and died at Villemoutiers, friar at Arbois, professor of mathématics for Napoleon I and for Jean-Charles Pichegru at the Royal Military School of Brienne-le-Château;
- Louis Pasteur (1822-1895), chemist, physician, microbiologist.
- René Garoz, resistance fighter originally from Lons-le-Saunier, participated in an attack on the German police on 14 March 1944, at Arbois, arrested on 26 March, condemned to death on 30 May, and executed on 1 June at the Citadel of Besançon;
- Joseph Nechvatal (1951-), painter, doctor of philosophy of art and new technologies, professor at the School of Visual Arts in New York City. He developed a computer virus programme at the Pasteur House during his stay at Arbois from 1990 to 1993.

== See also ==
- French wine
- Straw wine
- Communes of the Jura department
