= Pupillin =

Commune in Bourgogne-Franche-Comté, France

- Commune
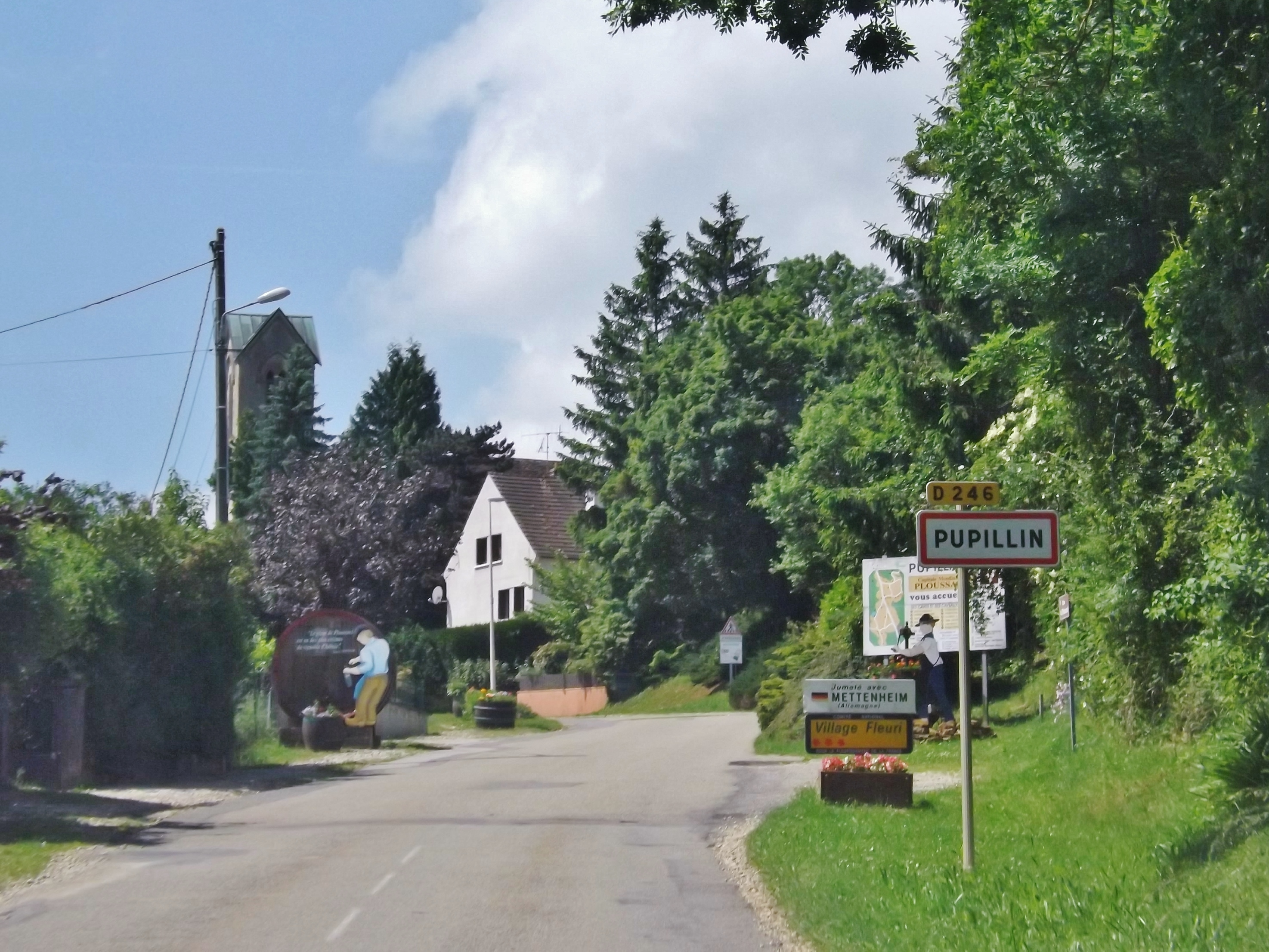
- The road into Pupillin
- Location of Pupillin
- Location within France Location within Bourgogne-Franche-Comté
- Coordinates: 46°53′02″N 5°45′42″E
- Country: France
- Region: Bourgogne-Franche-Comté
- Department: Jura
- Arrondissement: Dole
- Canton: Arbois
- Intercommunality: CC Arbois, Poligny, Salins – Cœur du Jura

Government
  - Mayor (2020–2026): Jean-Luc Beaupoil
- Area^{1}: 6.61 km^{2} (2.55 sq mi)
- Highest elevation: 622 m (2,041 ft)
- Lowest elevation: 238 m (781 ft)
- Population (2023): 248
  - Density: 37.5/km^{2} (97.2/sq mi)
- Time zone: UTC+01:00 (CET)
  - Summer (DST): UTC+02:00 (CEST)
- INSEE/Postal code: 39446 /39600
- ^{1} French Land Register data, which excludes lakes, ponds, glaciers > 1 km^{2} (0.386 sq mi or 247 acres) and river estuaries.

Pupillin is a commune in the Jura department in Bourgogne-Franche-Comté in eastern France.

== Population ==
Historical population
Year	Pop.	±% p.a.
1968	158	—
1975	148	−0.93%
1982	186	+3.32%
1990	213	+1.71%
1999	218	+0.26%
2007	256	+2.03%
2012	247	−0.71%
2017	237	−0.82%
2023	248	+0.76%
Source: INSEE

== Geography ==
Pupillin is located in the hills above Arbois, and is famed locally for its extensive vineyards, where monks were already growing grapes 1,000 years ago. Its marl soils and steep slopes provide excellent growing conditions for the local Poulsard and Savagnin grape varieties, the latter of which produces the renowned local Vin Jaune or Yellow Wine. The village even boasts the title of Capital of Ploussard, adopting the spelling of the grape variety which is particular to this village.

Pupillin is an authorised, special mention on bottles of APO Arbois wine.

== See also ==
- Communes of the Jura department
