= Enfariné noir =

French wine grape variety

- Grape (Vitis)
- Color of berry skin: Red
- Species: Vitis vinifera
- Also called: (more)
- Origin: France
- Notable regions: Aisne, Aube, Marne, Meuse and Seine-et-Marne departments

Enfariné noir (or Gouais noir) is a red French wine grape variety that is grown predominantly in the Jura wine region of eastern France. Despite being known under the synonym Gouais noir in the Aisne, Aube, Marne, Meuse and Seine-et-Marne departments, the grape has no known connection to the Gouais blanc wine grape that is the parent of several wine grape varieties such as Chardonnay, Gamay and Melon de Bourgogne. While once widely planted throughout the Franche-Comté, the grape is now nearly extinct with less than 1 hectare (2.5 acres) of the variety planted in 2008.

== History ==
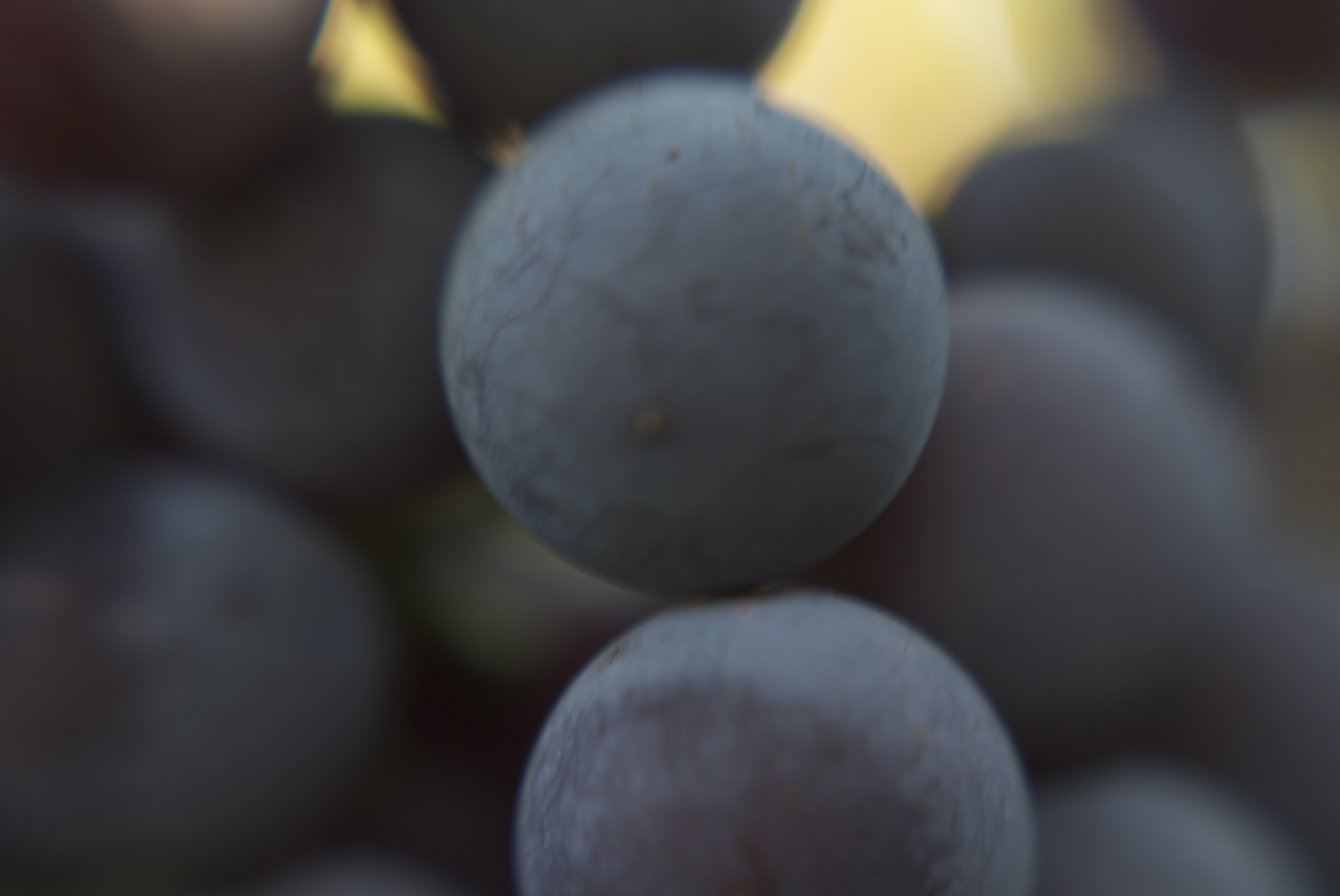
The name Enfariné comes from the French word farine and refers to the dusting or "bloom" of indigenous yeast that covers the berries as they ripen.

The name Enfariné comes from the French word farine meaning flour. It comes from the "bloom" or "blush" (now known to be indigenous yeast) that covers ripening grapes, looking like flour dusting. Some ampelographers, such as Pierre Galet, speculate that the grape originated in the Aube department in what is now part of the Champagne wine region.

The first written record of Enfariné noir comes from a February 3, 1731 decree from the parliament of Besançon in the Doubs department of the Franche-Comté. This decree mandated that all plantings of several grape varieties, including Enfariné, Foirard noir, Foirard blanc, Maldoux, Valet noir and Barclan blanc, that were planted after 1702 had to be uprooted and replaced with cereal crops. According to an 1856 report, this parliamentary decree resulted in a decreasing of vineyard plantings by more than a third by 1732.

The synonym Gouais noir has long been attached to Enfariné noir but ampelographers have determined that Enfariné noir is not a color mutation of Gouais blanc with no known connection between the two grapes. There is some speculation from ampelographers like Galet that the variety may have some connection to Gueuche noir of which it shares several synonyms.

== Viticulture ==
Enfariné noir is a late ripening variety that can be very productive and high yielding if not kept in check by winter bud pruning, low vigor rootstock and perhaps even green harvesting. The vine tends to create large cluster thick-skin berries that tend to be larger than other Vitis vinifera varieties. There are very few viticultural hazards that Enfariné noir is susceptible to with the vine being resistant to most grapevine diseases.

== Wine regions ==
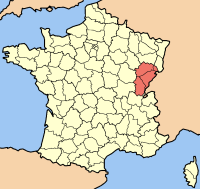
The Franche-Comté region where Enfariné noir was once widely planted

Enfariné noir was once widely planted throughout the Franche-Comté but over the last couple centuries its numbers have dramatically decreased and now the variety is nearly extinct. In 2008, less than 1 hectare (2.5 acre) of the vine was reported with the vast majority being found in the Jura wine region. Here producers such as Domaine Ganevat, Domaine des Cavarodes, Étienne Thiebaud and Domaine Jean Bourdy have worked to replant and sustain the variety in conservation vineyards. The results from these conservation vineyards often goes into vin de pays where it is often blended with Poulsard.

== Styles ==
According to Master of Wine Jancis Robinson Enfariné noir tends to produce wines with high acid levels that can be useful as a blending component, especially for light bodied reds meant to be consumed early, or in sparkling wine production.

== Synonyms ==
Over the years Enfariné noir has been known under a variety of synonyms, including Bourgogne, Bregin bleu, Brezin de Pampan, Chagnot, Chaigneau, Chamoisien, Chineau, Encendre, Enfarine, Enfariné du Jura, Gaillard (in Burgundy and along the Saône valley), Gau, Goix noir, Got noir, Gouache, Gouai noir, Gouailler, Gouais, Gouais noir, Gouais violet, Gouape, Gouat gau, Gouet, Grisard, Grison (in the arrondissement of Dole), Hureau, Lombard, Lurio, Mureau, Neri blau, Nerre, Petit Goix, Saint Martin, Urio and Urion.
