= Mondeuse noire =

Variety of grape

- Grape (Vitis)
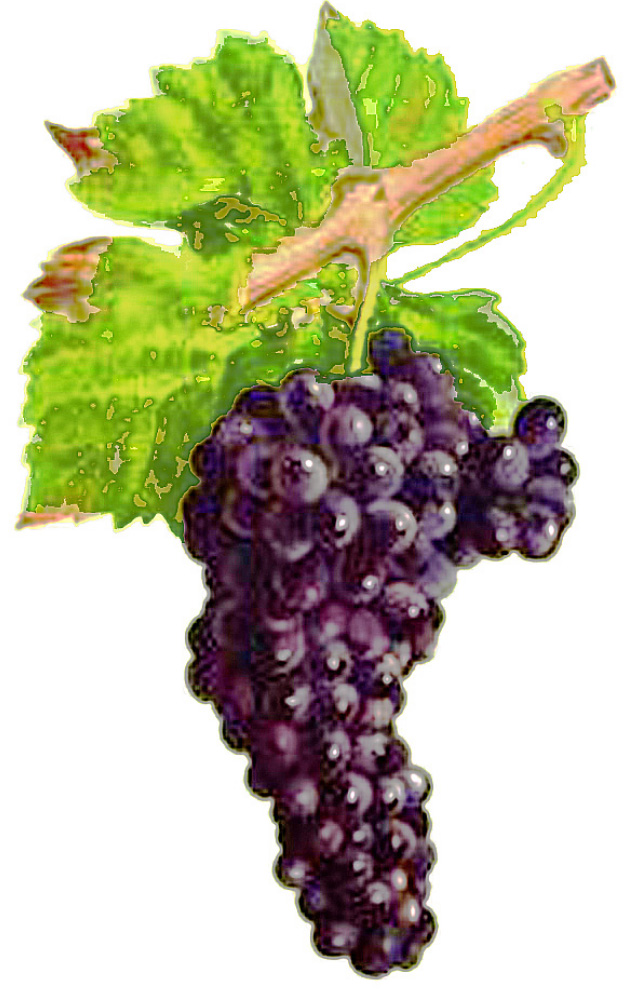
- Mondeuse in Viala & Vermorel
- Color of berry skin: Noir
- Species: Vitis vinifera
- Also called: see list of synonyms
- Origin: France
- Notable regions: Savoy
- VIVC number: 7921

Mondeuse noire (French: [mɔ̃.døz nwaʁ]) is a red French wine grape variety that is grown primarily in the Savoy region of eastern France. The grape can also be found in Argentina, Australia, California, Switzerland and Sicily. Plantings of Mondeuse noire was hit hard during the phylloxera epidemic of the mid to late 19th century which nearly wiped out the vine from eastern France. While the grape recovered slightly in the 20th century, French plantations of Mondeuse noire fell sharply in the 1970s, with just over 200 hectares (490 acres) left in France in 2000. In the early 21st century, it seems the variety has increased somewhat in popularity, as it can give good wines if the planting site is chosen carefully.

It was previously suggested that Mondeuse noire was identical to the northern Italian wine grape variety Refosco dal Peduncolo Rosso due to the similarity of the wines. In California, many plantings of Mondeuse noire were called Refosco, further adding to the confusion. DNA analysis has shown that this is not the case, and that the two varieties are unrelated. Mondeuse noire is very similar to Muscardin which is found in Southern Rhône where it is one of the thirteen grape varieties permitted in the wine Châteauneuf-du-Pape. One difference is that Muscardin has less sensitivity to downy mildew.

Ampelographers also thought that Mondeuse noire was a color mutation of Mondeuse blanche but DNA evidence has shown that not to be the case with the two varieties having a parent-offspring relationship though it is not yet clear which variety is the parent and which is the offspring. References to Mondeuse usually are to Mondeuse noire rather than to Mondeuse blanche. Mondeuse noire does have a pink-berried color mutant, Mondeuse grise, which was on the verge of extinction until ampelographer Pierre Galet was able to identify vines and have cuttings planted at the Domaine de Vassal conservation vineyard in Montpellier run by the Institut National de la Recherche Agronomique (INRA).

In Savoie, Mondeuse noire is used in blending with Gamay, Pinot noir and Poulsard where it contributes its dark color and high acid levels to the wine that allow the wines to age well. The grape is a permitted variety in the Appellation d'origine contrôlée (AOC) wines of Bugey in the Ain department and Vin de Savoie.

== History ==
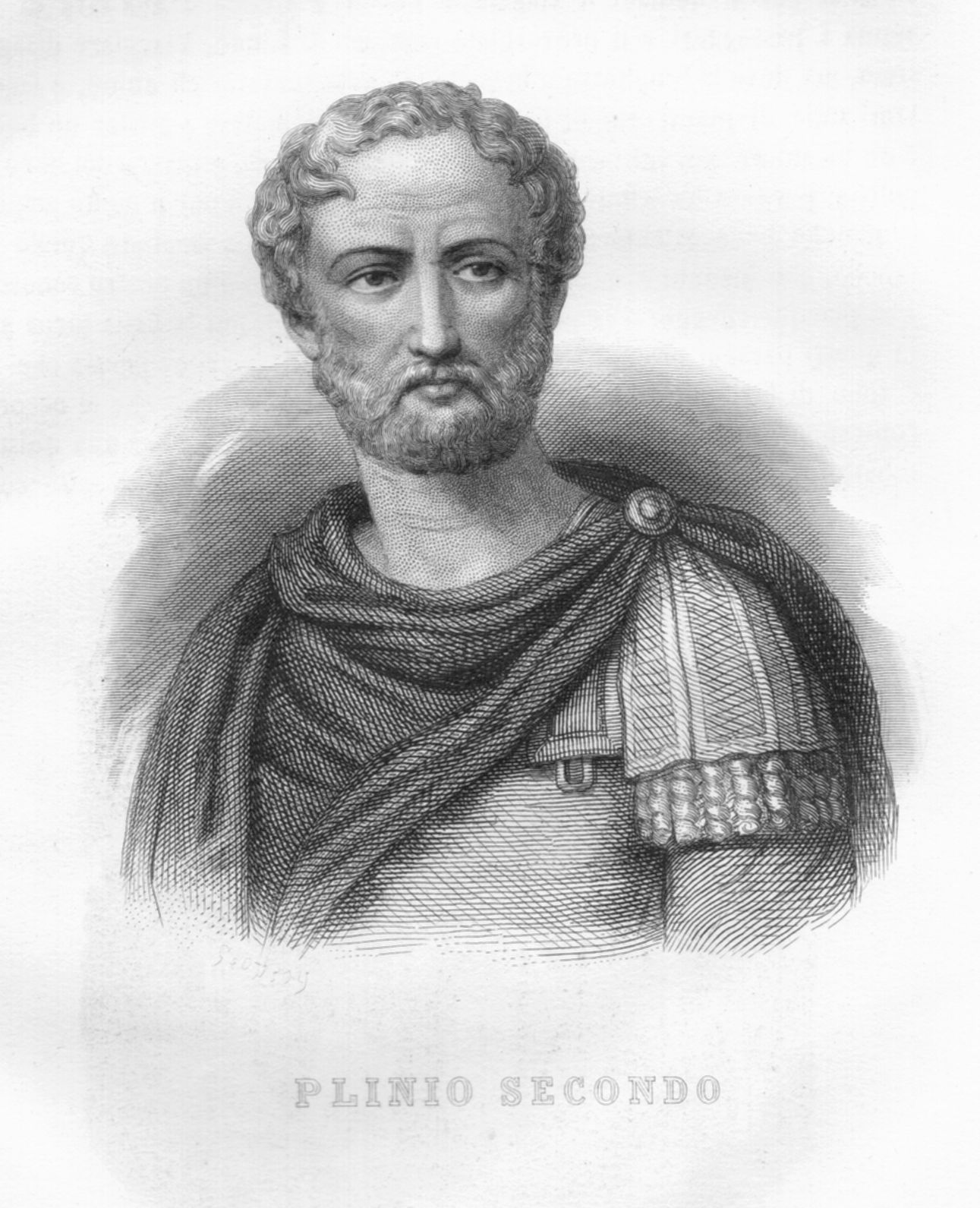
Mondeuse noire is one of the grape varieties speculated to have been the Allobrogica grape described by Pliny the Elder (pictured) and other ancient Roman writers.

There are several theories on the origin of the name Mondeuse. It could be derived from:

1. the Franco-Provençal terms for pruning, émonder and monder, which could be a reference to the fact that Mondeuse noire vines begin shedding their leaves before the grapes are harvested; or
2. the words moduse and moda, which have been historically applied to grape varieties that yield a high proportion of must; or
3. the French term mal doux, which means "badly sweet" and may be a reference to the bitter flavors of Mondeuse noire berries when sampled off the vine. To this day, the synonym Maldoux is still associated with Mondeuse noire in wine regions such as Jura in eastern France.

Most ampelographers believe that Mondeuse noire is indigenous to the Dauphiné region of southeastern France in an area that is now part of the Drôme, Hautes-Alpes and Isère departments. An early theory, popularized in 1887 by French ampelographer Pierre Tochon, is that Mondeuse noire could be the Ancient Roman grape Allobrogica described by Pliny the Elder and Columella as well as the 2nd century Greek writer Celsus. Ampelographers disagree about the identity of this grape, which grew widely in the land of the Allobroges after whom it is named for, with other theories speculating that the grape was instead the ancestor of Pinot noir or Syrah.

The first mention of Mondeuse noire, under the synonym Maldoux, dates to a February 3, 1731 decree from the parliament of Besançon in the Doubs department of the Franche-Comté. This decree mandated that all plantings of several grape varieties, including Maldoux, Enfariné, Foirard noir, Foirard blanc, Valet noir and Barclan blanc, that were planted after 1702 had to be uprooted and replaced with cereal crops. Under the name Mondeuse noire, the grape was noted in records from 1845 growing in the valley of the Isère.

== Relationship to other grapes ==
Mondeuse noire was once thought to be dark-berried color mutation of Mondeuse blanche, a variety that is best known for being the mother vine to the Rhône wine grape Syrah. However, in the early 21st century, DNA profiling showed that the two grapes actually had parent-offspring relationship though it is not yet known which grape is the parent and which is the offspring. This relationship makes Mondeuse noire, which is also known under the synonym Grosse Syrah, either a grandparent or half-sibling to Syrah.

When Mondeuse noire was first introduced to California in the 19th century, some plantings of the vine were misidentified as the Italian wine grape Refosco dal Peduncolo Rosso. This confusion was exacerbated in the 1960s when cuttings of Mondeuse noire labeled as "Refosco" were taken by the University of California, Davis from a vineyard in Amador County that was established in 1880s and propagated. In 1990s ampelographers began suspecting that these cuttings were not Refosco but rather Mondeuse noire, a fact later confirmed by DNA profiling.

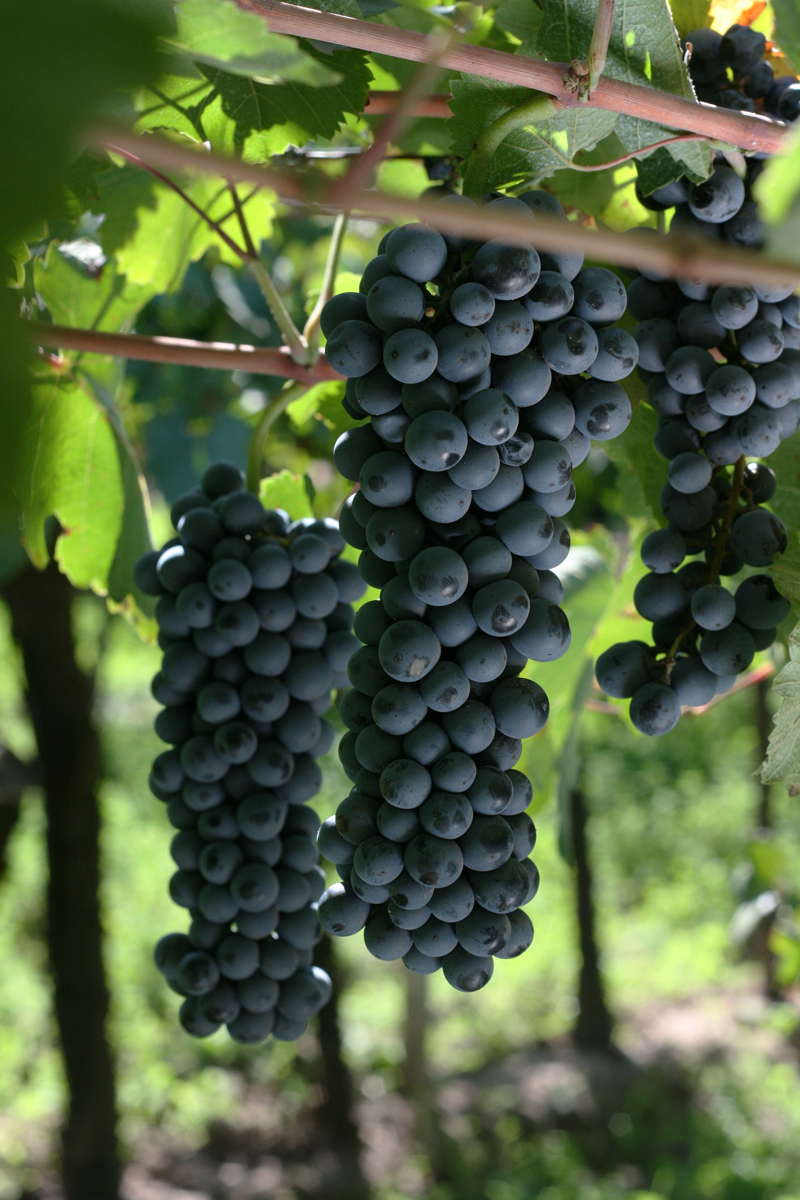
Though the exact relationship has not yet been determined, DNA analysis has shown that Mondeuse noire has some connection to Douce noir (pictured) that is grown in Argentina (as Bonarda) and California (as Charbono).

In addition to the confusion with Refosco, some plantings of Mondeuse noire in the Russian River Valley were discovered to actually be an offspring of Mondeuse noire, Calzin. This crossing of Mondeuse noire and Zinfandel was created by UC-Davis viticulturist Harold Olmo in 1937 and later developed a white-berried color mutation known as Helena. Also in the late 20th and early 21st century, it was discovered that some of the plantings of Petite Sirah were actually field blends of true Petite Sirah (Durif) as well as several other varieties including Mondeuse noire.

Though the exact relationship is not yet known, DNA analysis has also shown that Mondeuse noire has some relationship to the Savoie wine grape Douce noir which is known as Charbono in California and Bonarda in Argentina.

=== Mondeuse grise ===
While Mondeuse noire and Mondeuse blanche are not color mutations of one or the other, DNA evidence has confirmed that, like Pinot gris and Pinot noir, Mondeuse grise was a pink-berried mutation of Mondeuse noire. First described by ampelographer Victor Pulliat in the late 19th century, the vine was thought to be extinct until plantings were identified by Pierre Galet in the 1950s. From these plantings, cuttings were taken and the vine was planted at the Domaine de Vassal conservation vineyard in Montpellier ran by the Institut National de la Recherche Agronomique (INRA).

Today, outside of the plantings at the INRA's conservation vineyards, the only significant plantings of Mondeuse grise are being propagated as Persagne grise by Michel Grisard in Savoie.

== Viticulture ==
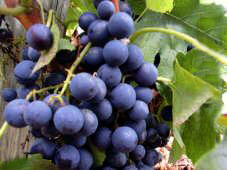
Mondeuse growing in Arbin, Savoie.

Mondeuse noire is a mid-ripening grape variety that tends to thrive on stony vineyard soils that have a high limestone and clay content. The vine can be very vigorous and high yielding which requires the cordons to be pruned short during the winter to keep the vine in check. Among the viticultural hazards that Mondeuse noire is susceptible to include chlorosis, mites, downy and powdery mildew. The vine is also very sensitive to drought conditions which may require irrigation in the vineyard.

In Savoie, Mondeuse noire plantings are most often trained in spur pruned systems.

== Wine regions ==
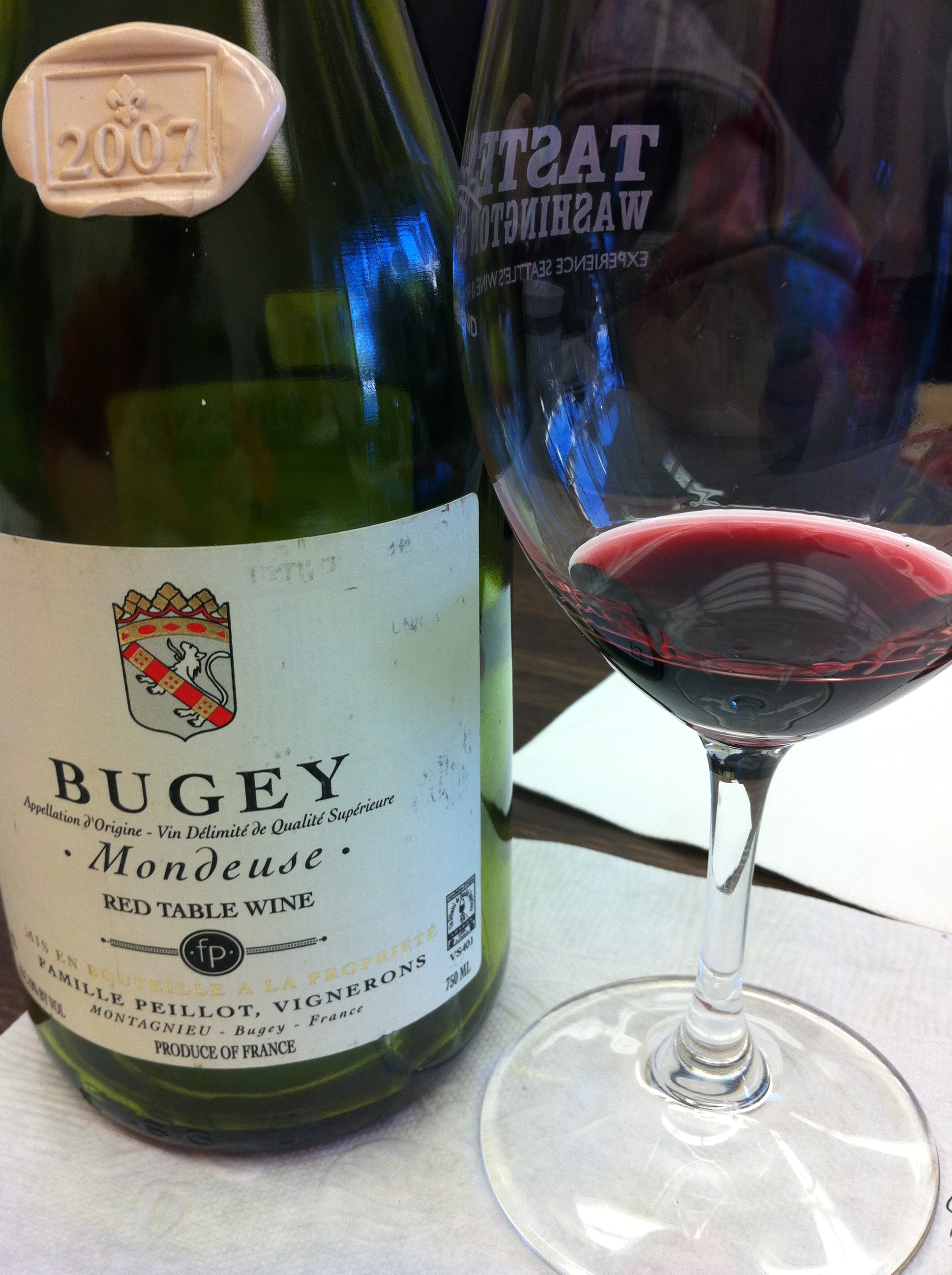
A Mondeuse noire wine from 2007 when Bugey was a Vin Délimité de Qualité Supérieure (VDQS) classified wine.

In 2009, there were 300 hectares (741 acres) of Mondeuse noire planted in France the vast majority of it in the Savoie wine region and the departments of eastern France. Here it is a permitted grape variety in the Appellation d'origine contrôlée (AOC) wines of Bugey in the Ain department and Vin de Savoie as well as the vin de pays wines of the region labeled under zonal designation of Vin de Pays d'Allobrogie. In Bugey, Mondeuse noire is permitted to be blended with Gamay and Pinot noir in the red and rosé wines of the AOC provided that the grapes are harvested to a yield no greater than 45 hectoliters/hectare (approximately 2.4 tonnes/acre) and the finished reaches at least 9% alcohol by volume. Bugey wines can also allow one of the villages in the region along the Rhone and Ain to hyphenate their names along to the AOC designation provided the harvest is restricted to no more than 40 hl/ha and the wine is made above the minimum alcohol level of 9.5%.

The Vin de Savoie AOC covers 1,500 hectares (3,705 acres) northeast of Lyon towards to the Swiss border. Here Mondeuse noire is grown and permitted to be blended with Gamay and Pinot noir in the red and rosé wines of the AOC. Here yields are restricted to 60 hl/ha (approximately 3.2 tonnes/acre) for the basic AOC and 55 hl/ha for cru classified wine and minimum alcohol levels are 9.5% for basic AOC and 10% for cru classified. While rarely used, Mondeuse noire is also permitted in the sparkling Vin de Savoie Mousseux or semi-sparkling Vin de Savoie Pétillant wines of the region. Like Pinot noir, which is a red wine grape used in Champagne, Mondeuse noire destined for sparkling wine production would be pressed soon after harvest in order to avoid having the white grape juice tinted by the color phenolics in the skins that are usually leached out by the maceration process.

In Switzerland, the grape is known as Gros Rouge and in the 19th century was the most widely planted red grape variety planted along the shores of Lake Geneva in what is now the Vaud, Valais and Geneva cantons. However, plantings of Mondeuse noire sharply declined throughout the 20th century and by 2009 there were only 4 hectares (10 acres) of the grape scattered throughout the Geneva and Vaud cantons.

=== In the New World ===
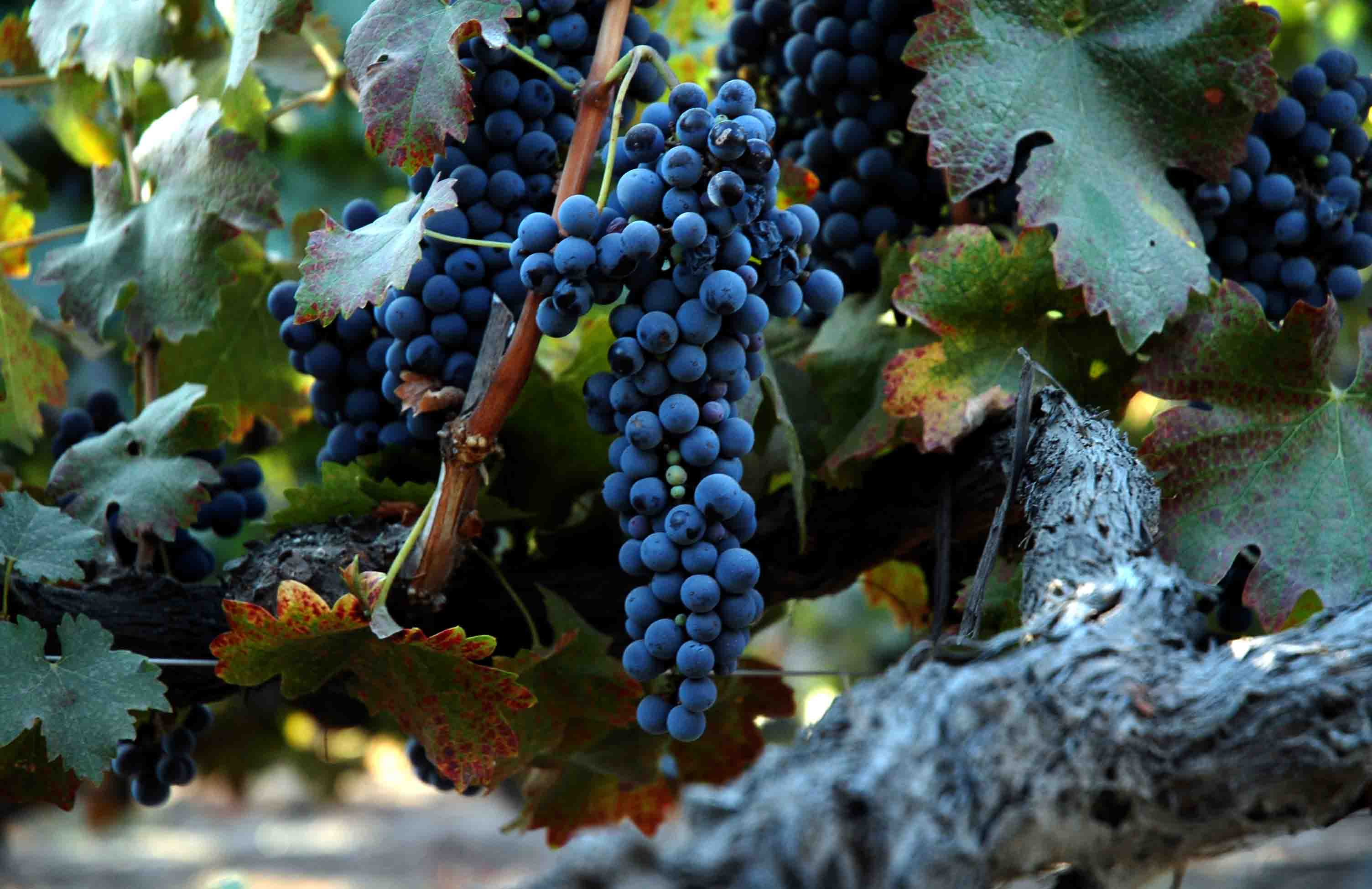
In some New World wine regions, such as Australia, Mondeuse noire is co-fermented/blended with Syrah/Shiraz (pictured).

Outside of Europe, Mondeuse noire can be found in New World wine region of Australia where producers such as Brown Brothers Milawa Vineyard grow the grape in Victoria. Among Brown Brothers 1.2 hectares (3 acres) of Mondeuse noire are 100 year plus old vines that date back to 1907. Here the variety is often co-fermented with Syrah and Cabernet Sauvignon.

Mondeuse noire has been planted in California since at least the 1880s when it was described by Charles Krug as one of the varieties that "ambitious winemen" were planting along with Cabernet Sauvignon, Petite Sirah, Miller Burgundy (likely Pinot Meunier), Crabb Burgundy and Malbec. Today, however, it is difficult to get an accurate count of Mondeuse noire plantings due to the longstanding confusion and mis-identification of plantings as being Refosco (and later confusion with Calzin). While the University of California, Davis officially corrected the error in 2005, the state of California was still counting Mondeuse noire and Refosco plantings as one and the same in their 2008 acreage reports. Some producers, such as Lagier-Meredith in Napa Valley, which is owned by UC-Davis geneticist Carole Meredith, have been able to independently confirm that their plantings of Mondeuse noire as authentic.

In the United States, Mondeuse noire is used to produce wines in several American Viticultural Areas including the Van Duzer Corridor AVA of Oregon's Willamette Valley at Pamar Vineyard and Johann Vineyard. Central Coast, El Dorado, Santa Cruz Mountains and Santa Maria Valley AVAs in California as well as the Southern Oregon AVAs of the Rogue Valley and Umpqua Valley AVA.

== Styles ==
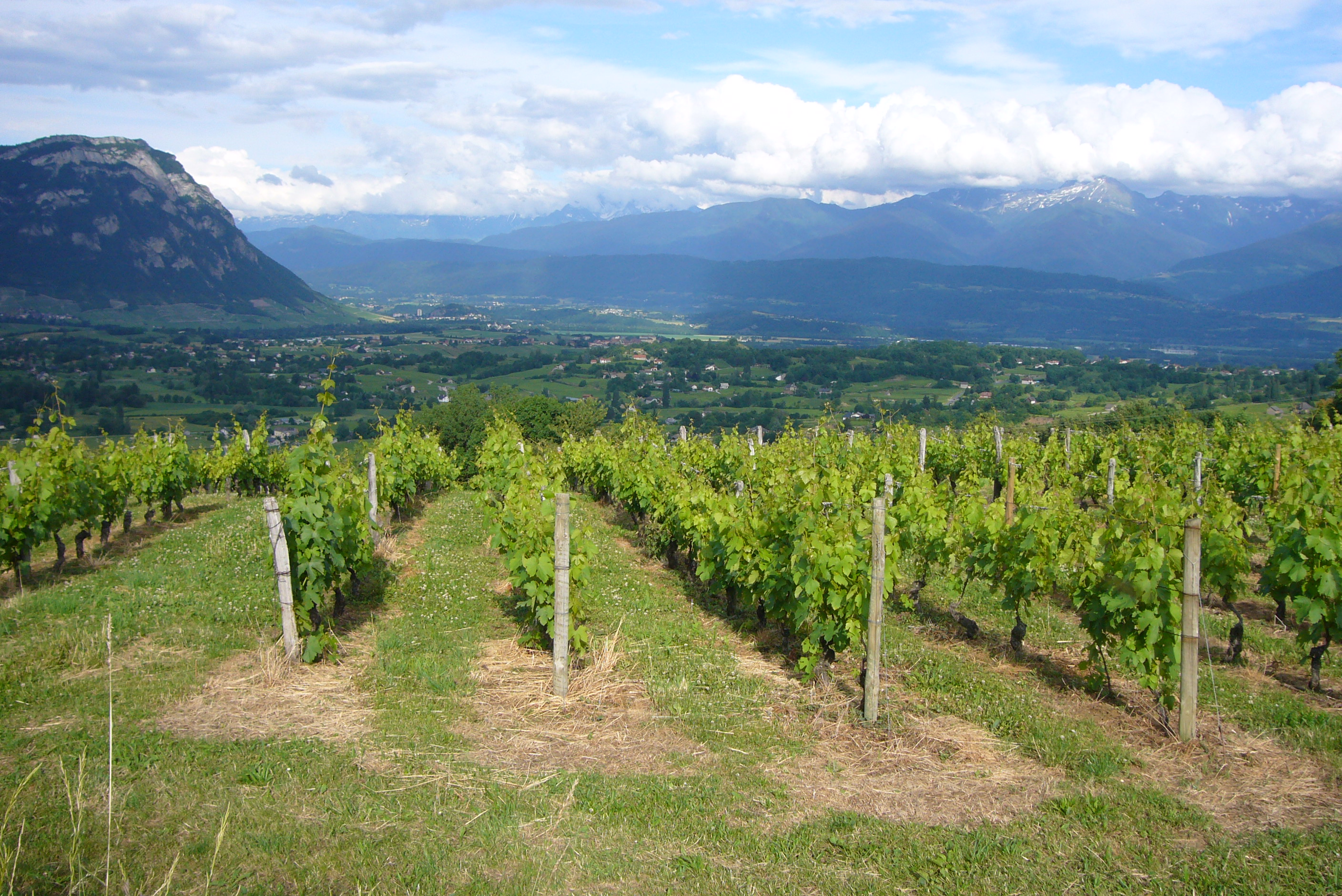
Master of Wine Clive Coates notes that in the cool alpine vineyards of Savoie (pictured) that Mondeuse noire can sometimes have difficulties ripening which will influence the character of the resulting wine.

According to Master of Wine Jancis Robinson, Mondeuse noire tends to produce deeply colored and very aromatic wines that can be very tannic but often have good aging potential. Some examples will have "bitter cherry bite" that can be reminiscent of some Italian styles of wine. In California, the grape is often blended with other varieties such as Syrah and tends to produce dark and spicy wines.

Wine expert Oz Clarke notes that one of the reasons why Mondeuse noire was often associated with the Friuli-Venezia Giulia wine grape Refosco dal Peduncolo Rosso was likely due to "Italianate intensity" of the wines produced from the grape with their bitter cherry notes and dark plum fruit.

Master of Wine Clive Coates notes that Mondeuse noire sometimes has difficulties fully ripening in the cool alpine climates of Savoie and eastern France which can lead to some examples of the wine being very acidic, tart and lacking fruit. However, wine expert Hugh Johnson believes that Mondeuse noire is often "underrated" and in Savoie has the potential to produce "forthright, fruity reds".

== Synonyms ==
Over the years Mondeuse noire has been known under a variety of synonyms including: Angelique, Argillet, Argilliere, Begeain, Begean, Bon Savoyan, Chetouan, Cintuan, Cotillon Des Dames, Gascon, Grand Chetuan, Grand Picot, Grand Picou, Gros Chetuan, Gros Picot, Gros Piquot, Gros Plant, Gros Rouge (in the Vaud and Geneva cantons of Switzerland), Gros Rouge Du Pays, Grosse Sirah, Gueyne, Guyenne, La Dame, Languedoc, Largillet, Maldoux (in Jura), Mandouse, Mandoux, Mandouze, Mantouse, Margilien, Margillin, Marlanche noire, Marsanne noire, Marsanne Ronde, Marve, Maudos, Maudoux, Meximieux, Molette, Molette noire, Mondeuse Rouge, Morlanche Mouteuse, Parcense, Persagne (in the Ain department), Persaigne, Persance, Persanne, Petite Persaigne (in the Rhône department), Pinot Vache, Plant Maldoux (in Jura), Plant Maudos, Plant Medoc, Plant Modo, Plant Modol, Plant noir, Prossaigne, Refosco, Rodo (in Portugal), Rouget, Salanaise, Savoe, Savoete, Savouai, Savouette, Savoyan (in the Isère department), Savoyanche, Savoyange, Savoyanne, Savoyant, Savoyard, Savoyen, Savoyet, Syrah Grosse, Terran, Terrano, Tornarin, Tournarin, Tournerin and Vache.
