= Vin jaune =

Type of French white wine from the Jura region

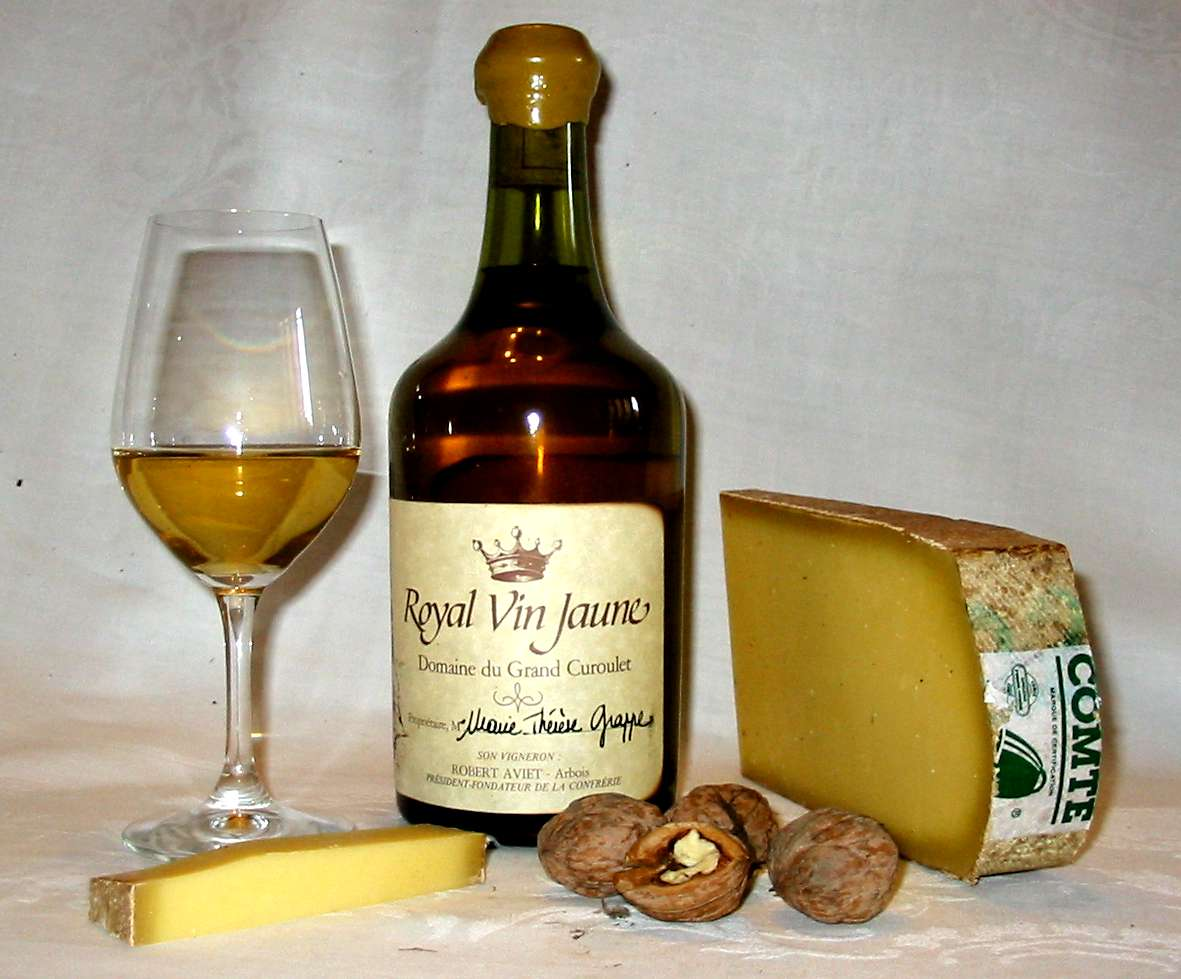
Vin jaune with Comté cheese and walnuts, a typical regional combination in Jura

Vin jaune (French for 'yellow wine') is a special and characteristic type of white wine made in the Jura region in eastern France. It is similar to dry fino Sherry and gets its character from being matured in a barrel under a film of yeast, known as the voile, on the wine's surface. Vin jaune shares many similarities with Sherry, including some aromas, but unlike Sherry, it is not a fortified wine. The wine is made from the Savagnin grape, with some of the most premium examples coming from the marl based vineyards in the Château-Chalon AOC. In other French wine regions, there has been experimentation in producing similar style wines from Chardonnay and other local grape varieties using cultured yeast such as the vin de voile wine produced in the Gaillac.

== Production ==
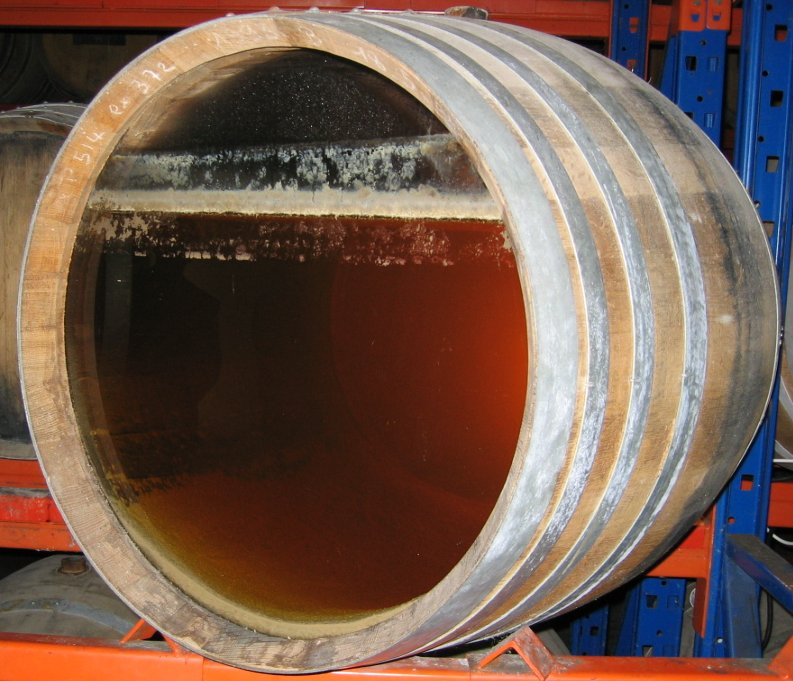
228L barrel of vin jaune in the course of maturation at the age of three years: Note the part des anges (angel's share) created by evaporation which is not topped up, permitting the formation of a voile (veil) of active yeast Saccharomyces cerevisiae type bayanus on its surface.

Vin jaune is made from late harvest Savagnin grapes, a white variety in the Traminer family which is less aromatic than the better-known Gewürztraminer. The grapes are usually harvested in late October when the sugars have developed enough to have a potential alcohol level of 13–15% for the finished wine. The grapes are fermented slowly and then kept in small old oak casks that hold 228 liters (60 gallons). The casks are not topped up, as they are with most wines, so evaporation creates an air gap above the wine. A film of yeast grows over the wine, protecting it partially (but not totally) from oxidation. In Jura, this film is called the voile (veil), but it is similar to the "flor" familiar from Sherry production. The voile yeast has many similar properties to "flor" but thrives better in a lower alcohol environment and develops less heavily and thickly than "flor" does.

The voile typically takes two to three years to develop fully. While the voile is incomplete, the wine is exposed to slight levels of oxidation that provoke chemical changes, producing acetaldehyde (as well as ethanol, standard alcohol) and sotolon, an aroma compound derived from alpha-ketobutyric acid. These compounds contribute to the unique flavors and aromas associated with vin jaune. Winemakers must carefully observe the wine throughout the aging process as there is a risk of it developing the wine fault of volatile acidity.

The wine acquires its characteristic yellow color and nutty flavors as it ages for the requisite time of six years and three months, the time that must elapse between harvest and bottling, although at certain points during this time the wine is not necessarily in the cask. After the allotted time, only about 62% of the original wine remains. The vin jaune is then bottled in special squat bottles that hold 62 cl (21 ounces), called clavelins. Historically the bottle size alludes to the amount of wine that remains from each litre after six years of aging and evaporation.

Vin jaune has been found to be produced from grapes that possess identical DNA to grape seeds unearthed in archaeological digs of medieval sites.

== Wine regions ==
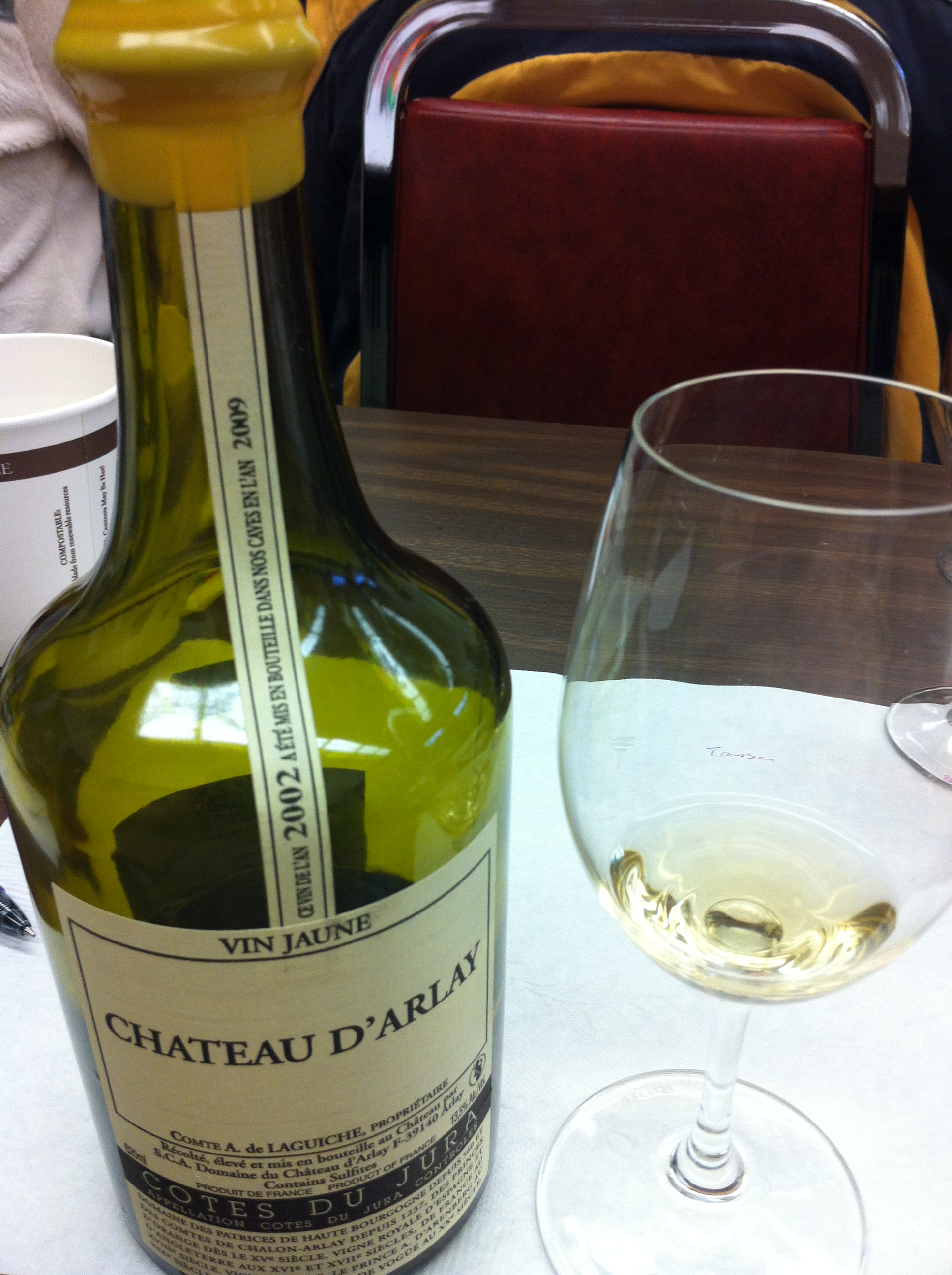
A vin jaune from the Cotes du Jura AOC

The Appellation d'origine contrôlée regions permitted to produce vin jaune include Château-Chalon AOC, Arbois Vin Jaune AOC, Cotes du Jura vin Jaune AOC and Vin Jaune de L'Etoile. Those protected "appellations" have existed since 1936. There are also a few other vin jaune-style wines made in France outside the Jura region, such as Gaillac. The term vin de voile referring to the yeast film, thus indicates this style of wine.

== Wine style and serving ==
Vin jaune is often served at cellar temperature 13–15 °C (55–60 °F) and the wine is sometimes decanted, exposing it to more oxygen prior to serving in order to stimulate the wine's unique aromas. The wine can be paired with savory food dishes with local Jura cuisine often including chicken recipes where the wine is cooked with the chicken itself and as a sauce component. Another common pairing is the local Comté cheese that is produced in the Franche-Comté region.

== La Percée du Vin Jaune ==
A festival called La Percée du Vin Jaune (Opening of the Yellow Wine) is held in the last week of January or the first week of February each year to celebrate release of the newly released vintage, which due to the legal requirements for aging will be the one harvested in the autumn seven years earlier. Recent events, including tasting sessions, have attracted over 30,000 visitors. Each year, a different venue is chosen. They are as follows:

- 1997 : Poligny
- 1998 : Arbois
- 1999 : Château-Chalon and Voiteur
- 2000 : L'Étoile
- 2001 : Gevingey
- 2002 : Montigny-lès-Arsures
- 2003 : Arlay
- 2004 : Cramans
- 2005 : Saint-Lothain
- 2006 : Lons-le-Saunier
- 2007 : Salins-les-Bains
- 2008 : Vincelles
- 2009 : Passenans and Frontenay
- 2010 : Poligny
- 2011 : Arbois
- 2012 : Ruffey-sur-Seille
- 2013 : Voiteur
- 2014 : Perrigny and Conliège
- 2015 : Montigny-lès-Arsures
- 2016 : Lons-le-Saunier
- 2017 : Not held
- 2018 : L'Étoile
- 2019 : Poligny
- 2020 : Ruffey-sur-Seille
- 2021 : Not held (COVID-19)
- 2022 : Cramans
- 2023 : Voiteur
- 2024 : Arbois
