= Yellow wine =

Yellow wine may refer to:

- Vin jaune, a type of French white wine from the Jura region
- Huangjiu, a type of Chinese alcoholic beverage made from a variety of grains
