= Gros plant =

Gros plant is a synonym for several wine grape varieties including:

- Dolcetto
- Folle Blanche
- Gueuche noir
- Peloursin
