= Gueuche noir =

Variety of grape

Gueuche noir is a red French wine grape variety that has been historically grown in the Franche-Comté of eastern France but is now close to being extinct. Though its exact relationship has not yet been determined by DNA analysis, ampelographers believe that the grape variety is closely related to the Hunnic grape Gouais blanc which is notable for being the mother vine to several grape varieties including Chardonnay and Gamay. There also might be a relationship between Gueuche noir and the Jura wine grape Enfariné noir.

== History ==
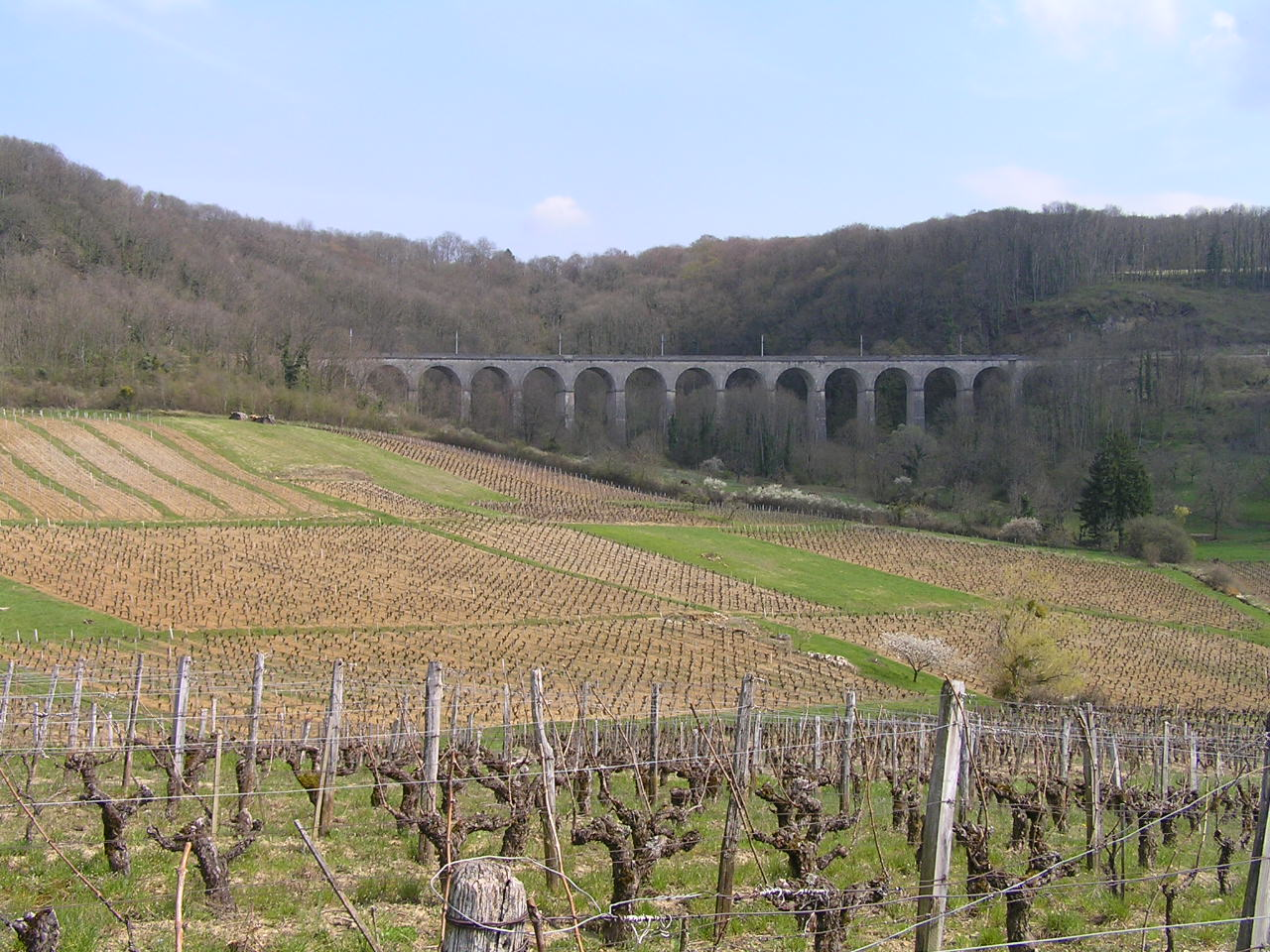
Vineyard in the Franche-Comté region where Gueuche noir has been historically grown.

Records indicate that Gueuche noir has been growing in the Franche-Comté at least the 18th century. Under the synonym Foirard noir, the grape may have been one of the varieties listed on a February 3, 1731 parliamentary decree from Besançon in the Doubs department that mandated that all plantings of Enfariné noir, Foirard noir, Foirard blanc, Valet noir and Barclan blanc that were planted after 1702 to be uprooted and replaced with cereal crops.

The exact origins of Gueuche noir are not yet known but early DNA analysis suggest a strong relationship between the grape and the genetically prolific Gouais blanc vine which is the mother and grandparent to several Vitis vinifera varieties. In the 20th century, ampelographers such as Pierre Galet and Jean Guicherd have speculated that Gueuche noir may have some relationship to the Jura variety Enfariné noir.

== Viticulture ==
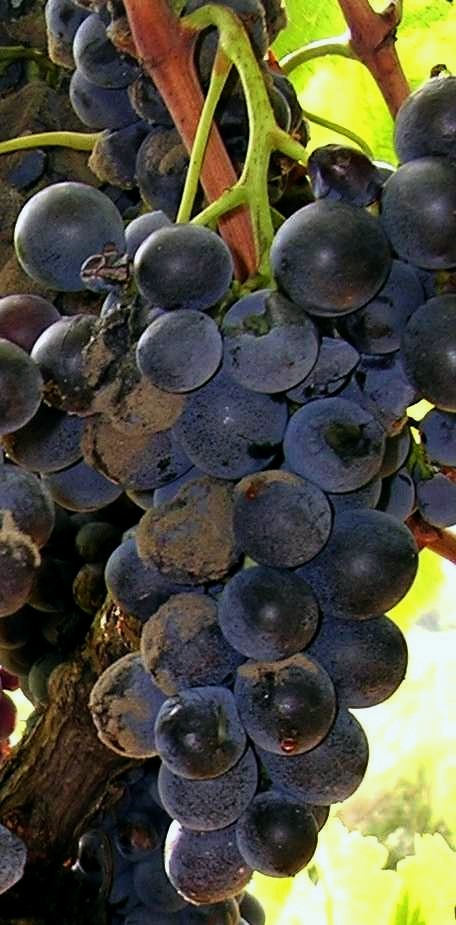
While infection of Botrytis cinerea can be welcomed in some white grape varieties, in red wine grapes such as Gueuche noir it contributes to the viticultural hazard of botrytis bunch rot (pictured).

Gueuche noir is a mid to late-ripening grape variety that can be very fertile and high yielding. The grape's thin skins and small, compact bunches are susceptible to a number of viticultural hazards including fungal disease like downy and powdery mildew as well as botrytis bunch rot.

== Wines regions ==
While once widely planted in the Franche-Comté, today the grape is nearly extinct and is currently not listed in France's official registry of grape varieties permitted for use in Appellation d'Origine Contrôlée (AOC) wine production. In the commune of Liesle in the Doubs department, Domaine des Cavarodes has been rehabilitating an old vineyard that includes old vines of Gueuche noir that are between the ages of 50–100 years. These vines are field blended with several other grape varieties including Gamay, Enfariné noir, Pinot noir, Pinot Meunier, Poulsard, Trousseau, Argant, Blauer Portugieser and Mézy. The grapes are harvested together and used to produce a red blend under the Vin de Pays de Franche-Comté designation.

Another Jura wine producer, Domaine Ganevat in Rotalier, has also replanted a small vineyard with new Gueuche noir vines that they use in the blend for their early-drinking nouveau wine.

== Styles ==
According to ampelographer Pierre Galet, Gueuche noir tends to have difficulties ripening in the Franche-Comté with varietal examples of the grape often being very acidic and "hard" tasting.

== Synonyms ==
Over the years Gueuche noir has been known under a variety of synonyms including: Espagnon, Foirard, Foirard noir (in Poligny, Jura), Gouais, Gros plant, Guat, Plant d'Anjou noir, Plant d'Arlay (in Salins-les-Bains), Plant de Saint-Remy and Plant de Treffort (in the Ain department).
