= Château-Chalon AOC =

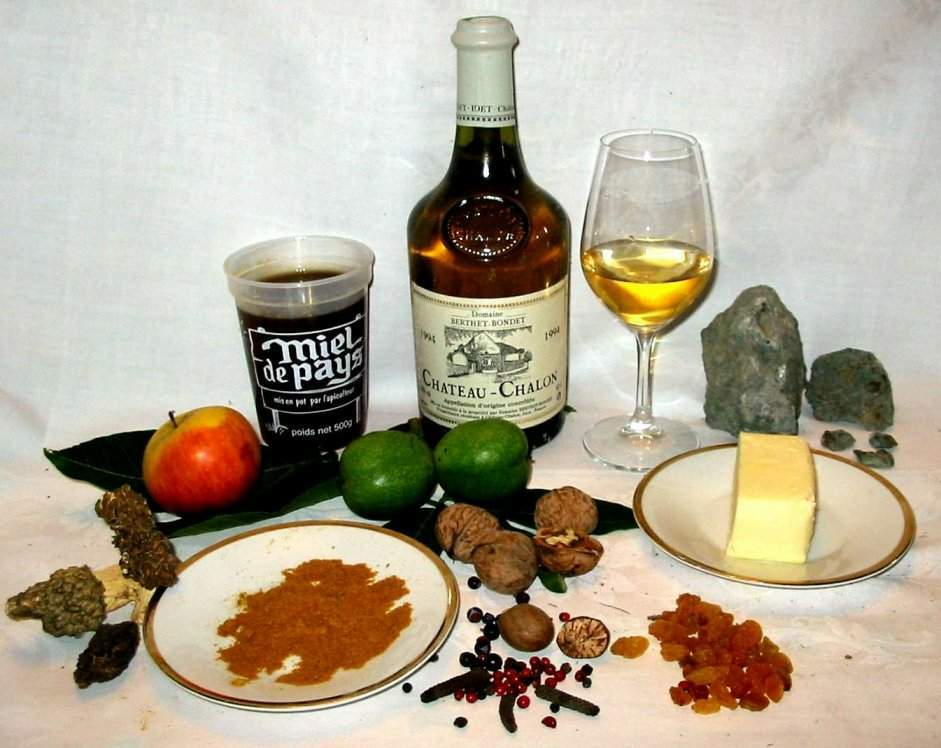
A bottle of Château-Chalon together with the many items whose flavours can be found in young or mature Château-Chalon and other examples of vins jaune. Notice the characteristic shape of the 62 cl clavelin bottle.

Château-Chalon (French pronunciation: [ʃato ʃalɔ̃]) is an Appellation d'Origine Contrôlée for wines made in the Jura wine region of France, around the village of Château-Chalon. Only white wines from the Savagnin grape made in the vin jaune ("yellow wine") style can be made using this appellation. However, the Château-Chalon wines are not explicitly labeled as vin jaune. It is bottled in the traditional bottle called clavelin that is of a peculiar shape and with a capacity of 62 cl, which is, according to local legend, the amount left of a litre of wine after aging in cask for six years and three months - the legal minimum for Chateau Chalon. Once bottled, the wine is of great longevity, and can age for several decades.

== Climate and geography ==
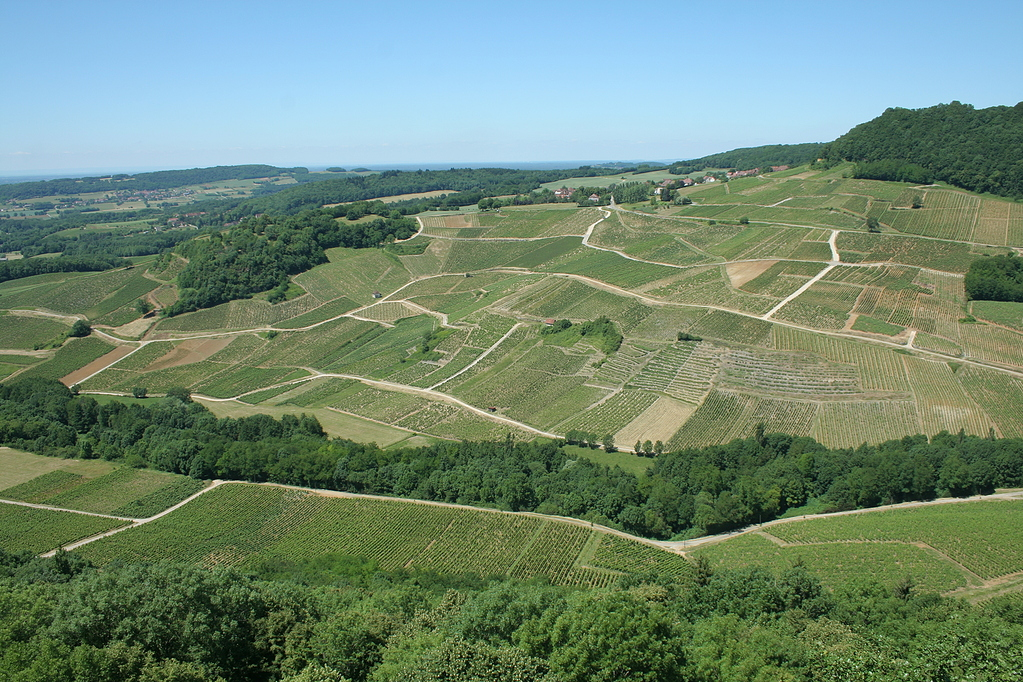
Vineyards.

Château-Chalon is located in hilly terrain in the eastern French wine region of Jura. The area has a continental climate, which includes very cold winters. The climate during harvest time is normally dry enough to be able to pick the grapes at a late harvest stage, normally in late October. The vineyard soils are composed of limestone marl.

== Wine production ==
The Château-Chalon AOC is dedicated exclusively to the production of vin jaune wine. There are other appellations within Jura that are permitted to produce AOC vin jaune, most notably the Côtes du Jura AOC, but Château-Chalon has specific regulations that are unique to this AOC. To begin with, the grapes must be harvested at brix levels that allow for a potential alcohol content of at least 12% in the finished wine; other regions will allow a minimum of 11.5%. While the grapes are harvested late, they are never botrytized, unlike other well known late harvest French wines such as Sauternes. After fermentation the wine must be stored for at least six years and three months prior to bottling. The majority of time is spent in wood casks that are only partially filled, allowing for a film of yeast, known as the voile or "veil", to develop across the surface. This voile yeast is similar to the benevolent flor yeast that is used in sherry production, and vin jaune shares some similarities in styles to sherry, though vin jaune is not fortified.

The producers of Château-Chalon are very particular about quality and will sacrifice an entire year's production, not making any wine, if the weather of a particular vintage was not favorable. In good years, production will average around 2000 hectoliters (52,835 gallons).

== Wine style ==
The vin jaune wine of Château-Chalon is known for its nutty flavors and aromas, and can develop additional curry notes as the wines ages due to presence of sotolon. The wine's yellow color ranges from pale to deep gold. The wines are often paired with the local AOC designated chicken from the nearby region of Bresse.
