= Cramans =

Commune in Bourgogne-Franche-Comté, France

- Commune
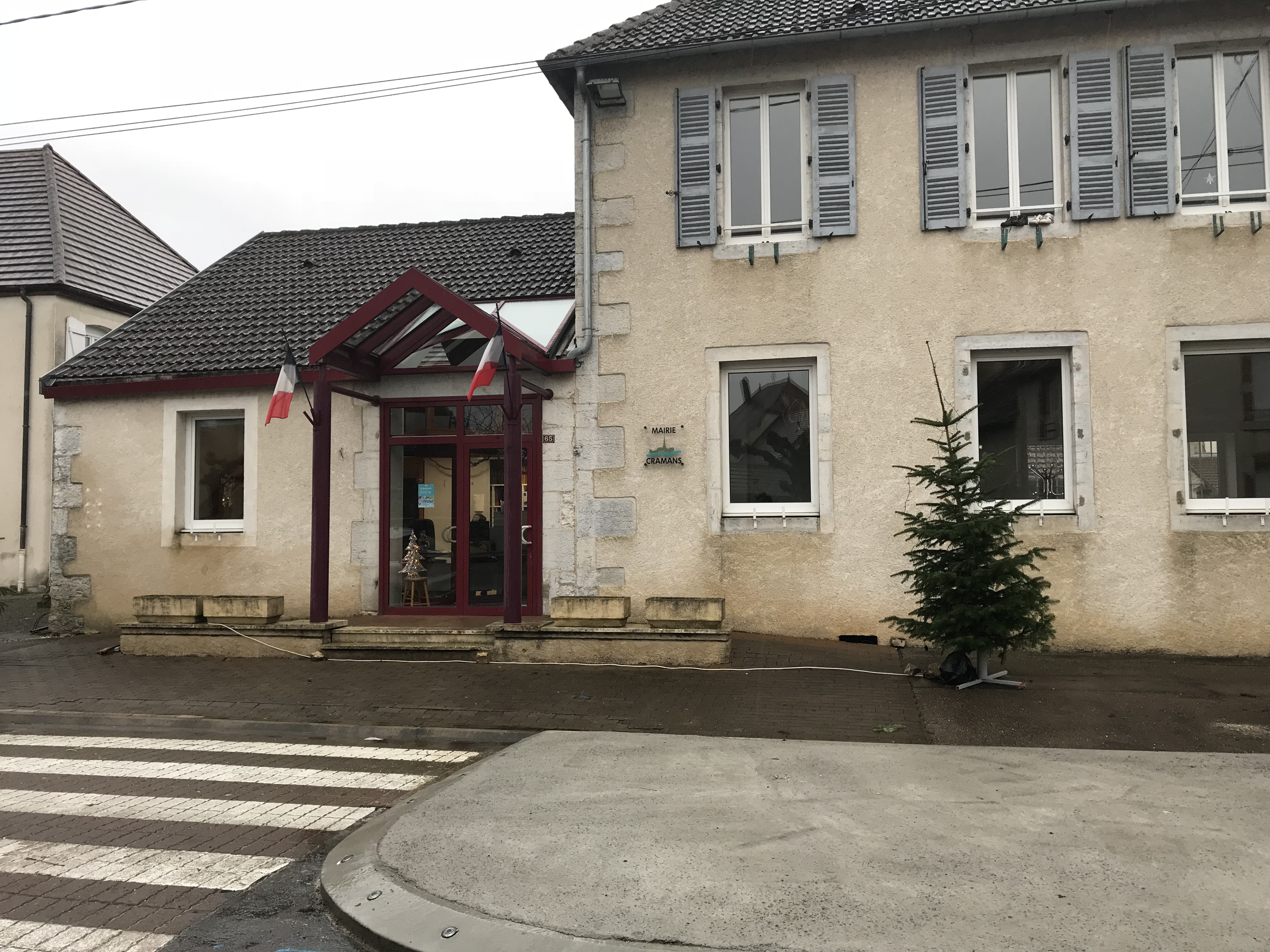
- The town hall in Cramans
- Location of Cramans
- Location within France Location within Bourgogne-Franche-Comté
- Coordinates: 47°00′48″N 5°46′48″E
- Country: France
- Region: Bourgogne-Franche-Comté
- Department: Jura
- Arrondissement: Dole
- Canton: Mont-sous-Vaudrey

Government
  - Mayor (2020–2026): Jean-Marie Truchot
- Area^{1}: 8.13 km^{2} (3.14 sq mi)
- Highest elevation: 340 m (1,120 ft)
- Lowest elevation: 229 m (751 ft)
- Population (2023): 509
  - Density: 62.6/km^{2} (162/sq mi)
- Time zone: UTC+01:00 (CET)
  - Summer (DST): UTC+02:00 (CEST)
- INSEE/Postal code: 39176 /39600
- ^{1} French Land Register data, which excludes lakes, ponds, glaciers > 1 km^{2} (0.386 sq mi or 247 acres) and river estuaries.

Cramans (French pronunciation: [kʁamɑ̃]) is a commune in the Jura department in Bourgogne-Franche-Comté in eastern France.

== Population ==
Historical population
Year	Pop.	±% p.a.
1968	361	—
1975	337	−0.98%
1982	380	+1.73%
1990	454	+2.25%
1999	430	−0.60%
2007	473	+1.20%
2012	505	+1.32%
2017	524	+0.74%
2023	509	−0.48%
Source: INSEE

== See also ==
- Communes of the Jura department
