= Voiteur =

- Commune
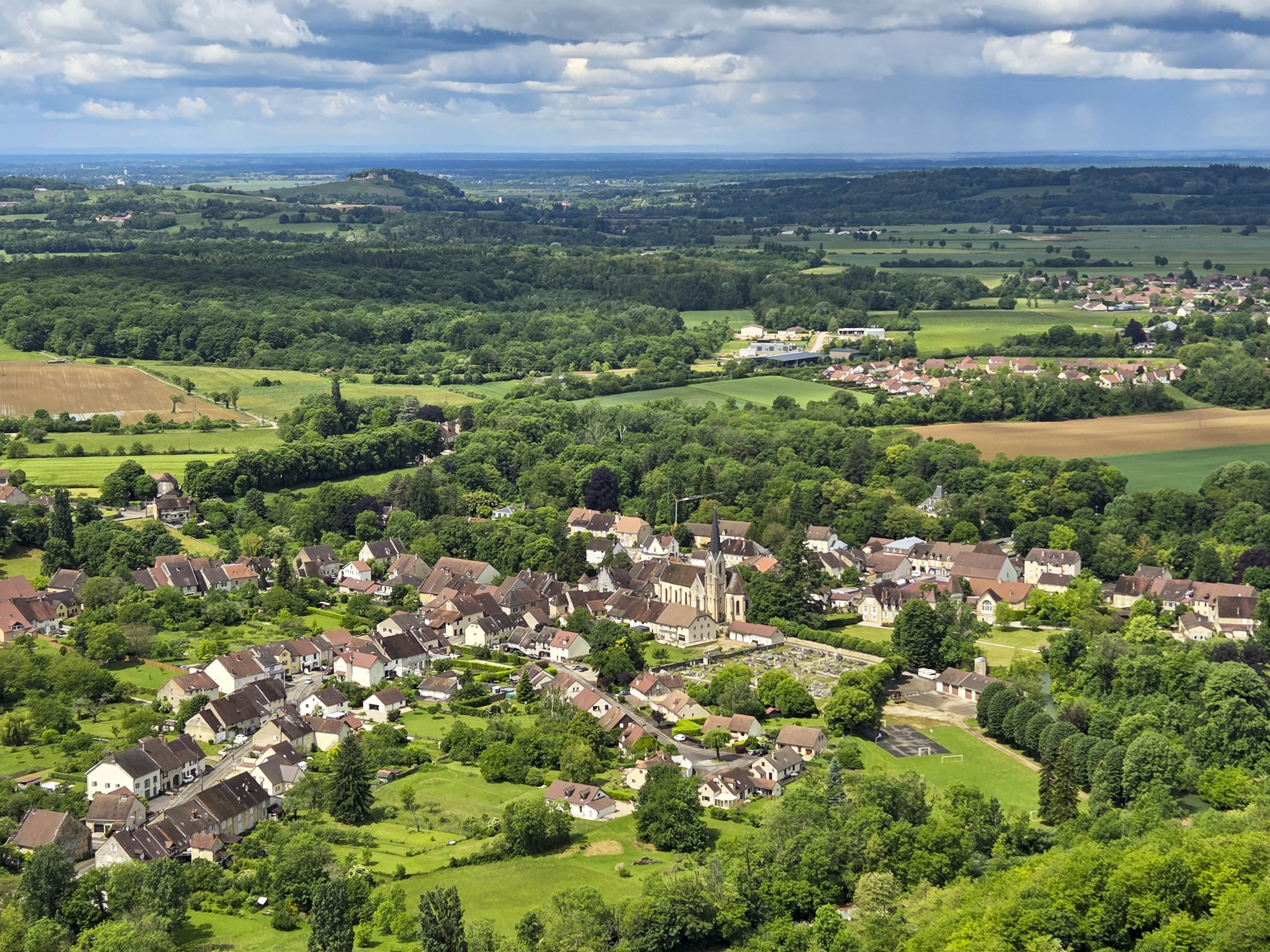
- General view of Voiteur

- Coat of arms
- Location of Voiteur
- Location within France Location within Bourgogne-Franche-Comté
- Coordinates: 46°45′18″N 5°36′44″E
- Country: France
- Region: Bourgogne-Franche-Comté
- Department: Jura
- Arrondissement: Lons-le-Saunier
- Canton: Poligny
- Intercommunality: Bresse Haute Seille

Government
  - Mayor (2020–2026): Corinne Linda
- Area^{1}: 9.42 km^{2} (3.64 sq mi)
- Highest elevation: 497 m (1,631 ft)
- Lowest elevation: 245 m (804 ft)
- Population (2023): 788
  - Density: 83.7/km^{2} (217/sq mi)
- Time zone: UTC+01:00 (CET)
  - Summer (DST): UTC+02:00 (CEST)
- INSEE/Postal code: 39582 /39210
- ^{1} French Land Register data, which excludes lakes, ponds, glaciers > 1 km^{2} (0.386 sq mi or 247 acres) and river estuaries.

Voiteur (French pronunciation: [vwatœʁ]) is a commune in the Jura department in the Bourgogne-Franche-Comté region in eastern France.

== Population ==
Historical population
Year	Pop.	±% p.a.
1968	724	—
1975	719	−0.10%
1982	731	+0.24%
1990	713	−0.31%
1999	718	+0.08%
2007	777	+0.99%
2012	748	−0.76%
2017	746	−0.05%
2023	788	+0.92%
Source: INSEE

== See also ==
- Communes of the Jura department
