= Poulsard =

Variety of grape

- Grape (Vitis)
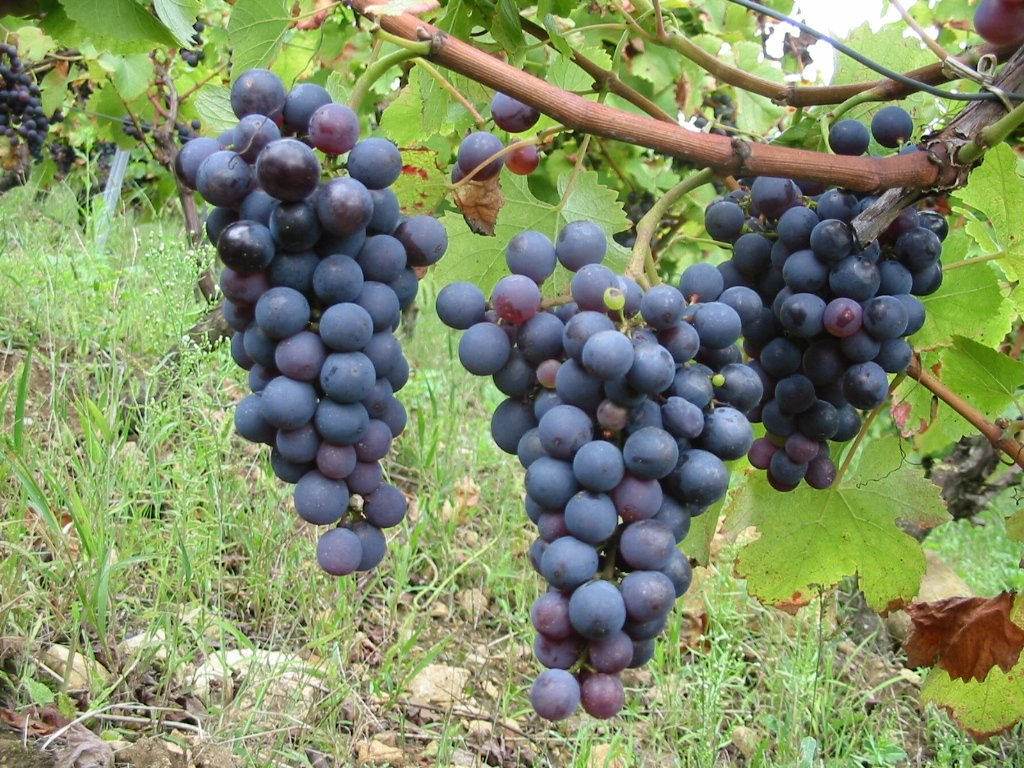
- Poulsard grapes
- Color of berry skin: Noir
- Species: Vitis vinifera
- Also called: Ploussard
- Origin: France
- VIVC number: 9643

Poulsard (also Ploussard) is a red French wine grape variety from the Jura wine region. The name Ploussard is used mainly around the town of Pupillin but can appear on wine labels throughout Jura as an authorized synonyms. While technically a dark-skinned noir grape, the skins of Poulsard are very thin with low amounts of color -phenols and produces very pale colored red wines, even with extended maceration and can be used to produce white wines. Because of this, Poulsard is often blended with other red-skin varieties or used to produce lightly colored rosé wines. Additionally the grape is used to make blanc de noir white wines and sparkling cremants.

Poulsard is an authorized grape variety in the Appellation d'Origine Contrôlée (AOC) wines of Arbois AOC, Côtes du Jura AOC, Crémant du Jura AOC, L'Etoile AOC and Macvin du Jura AOC. Outside Jura, Poulsard is also grown in Bugey AOC of the Ain département in eastern France.

== Wine regions ==
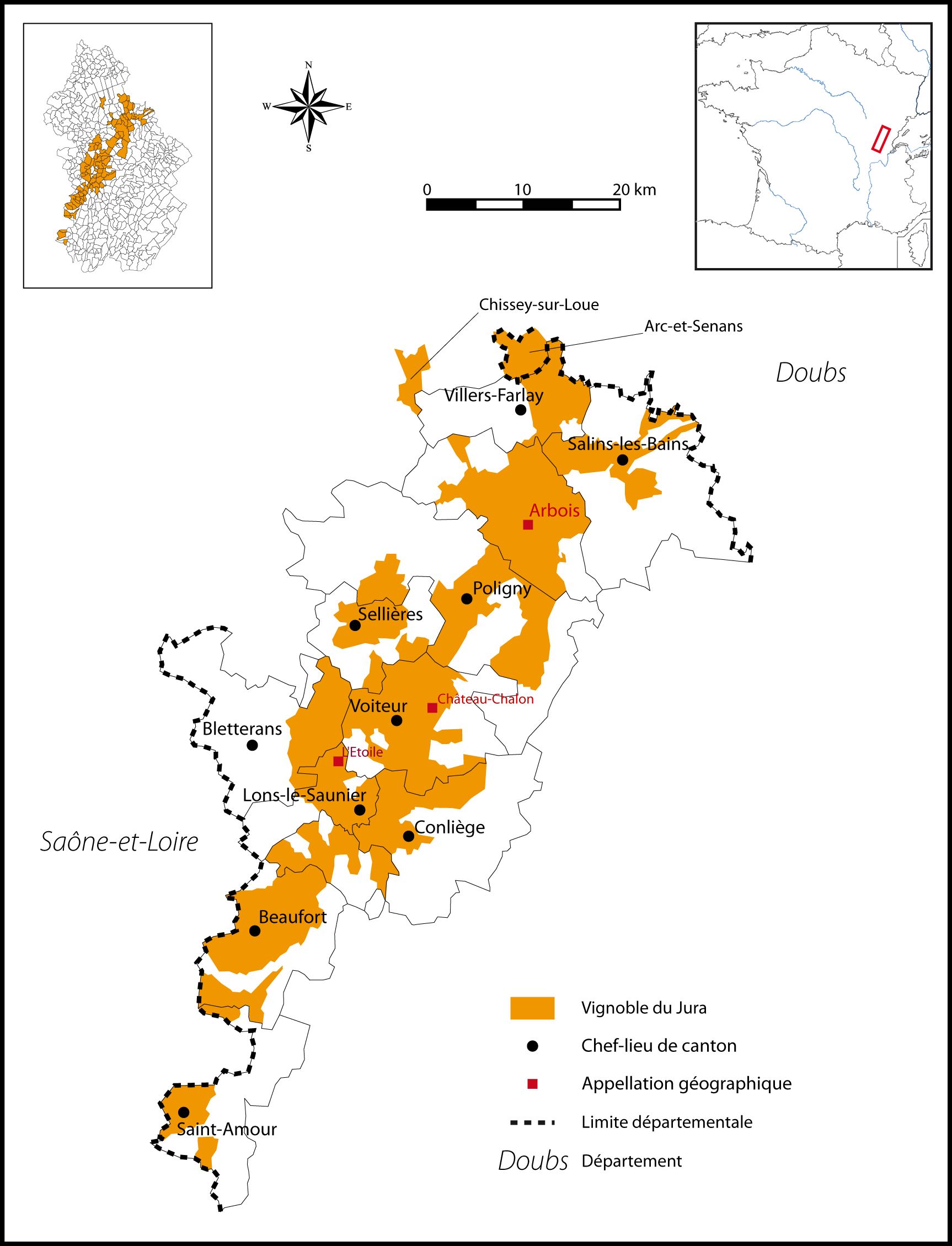
Poulsard is found primarily in the Jura wine region of eastern France.

Poulsard is found almost exclusively in eastern France, particularly in the Jura between Burgundy and Switzerland where it has been grown since the 15th century. Because of its versatility and its distinctive floral aromas, the grape was once the most widely planted grape variety in Jura but because of various viticultural difficulties and changing trends in the wine market, its numbers have declined. However, it is still the second most widely planted in Jura.

It is a permitted grape in several Jura AOCs including the Arbois and Côtes du Jura AOC where it is blended with Trousseau noir and Pinot noir to produce red and rosé; the L'Etoile AOC where it is used to produce a blanc de noir white wine and the Crémant du Jura AOC where it is used to make white and sparkling rosé. Outside Jura, it is grown in the Bugey wine region located near the Beaujolais wine region. There Poulsard is blended with Gamay, Pinot noir and Mondeuse noire to produce light reds.

== Viticulture ==
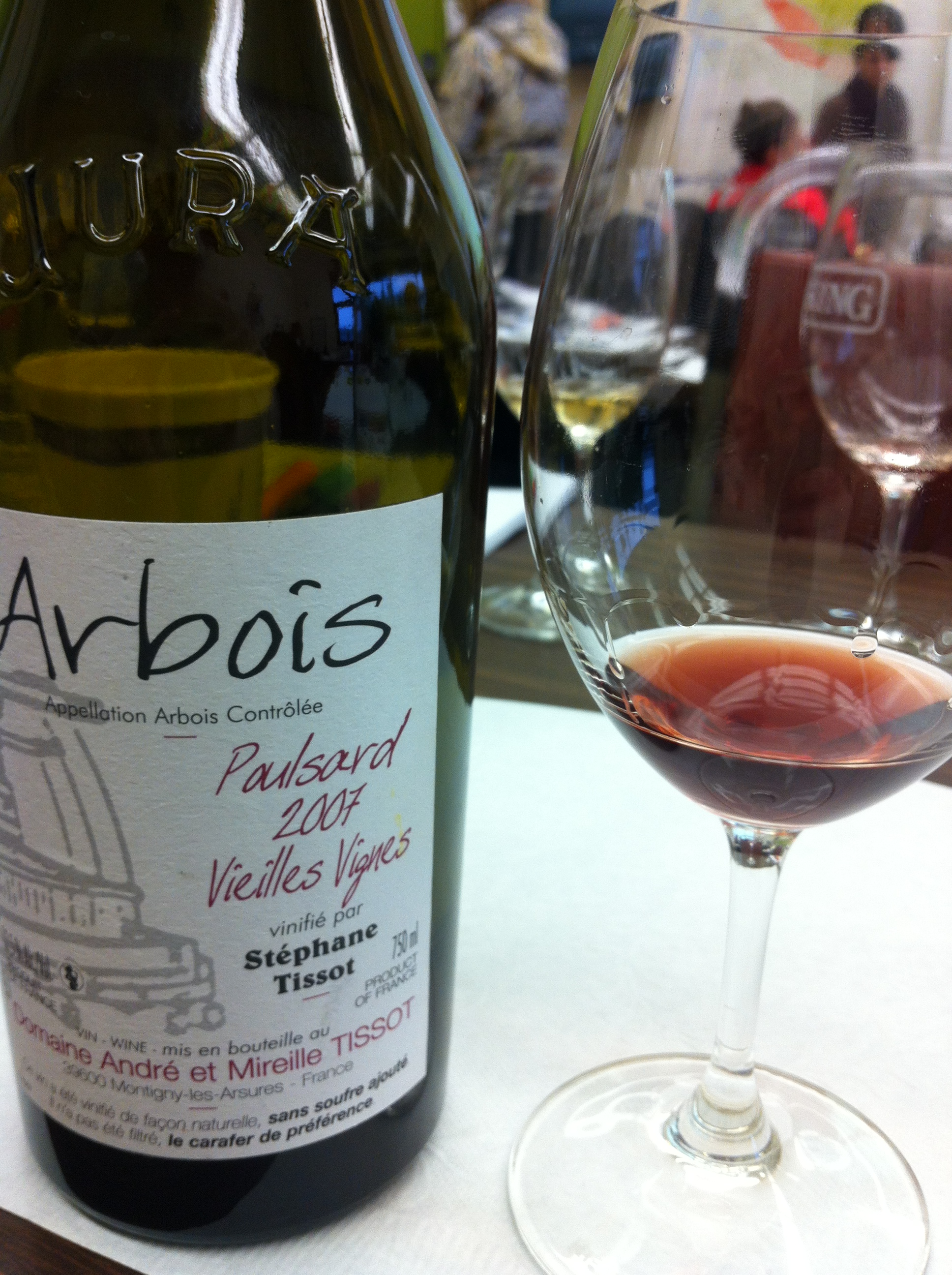
A Poulsard from Arbois.

While the grape can grow in many different vineyard soils, in Jura it is most often planted on shale marl, limestone and clay soils. The grape clusters produce tightly compacted bunches with thin-skinned oval berries that have a light violet to black color.

The Poulsard vine tends to buds early, which makes it prone to the viticultural hazard of early spring time frost. In some vintages, coulure can set in and affect yields (which are usually very low to begin with). Additionally the vine is very susceptible to various grape diseases including downy mildew, grey rot and oidium. These issues, coupled with its low phenolics and coloring pigments, have contributed to the grape's decline in overall plantings, though it still maintains its presence in Jura.

Historically, Poulsard has been used in eastern France as a table grape but its thin skin has made transport of the grape beyond local villages difficult.

=== Clones ===
Over the centuries the Poulsard grape has developed a number of mutations that have allowed clones of the variety to emerge. In addition to the light red-berried form that is most commonly found, there is a completely white-skin and separate pink-skinned variety of Poulsard as well as deeply aromatic, darker skin variety musqué clone.

== Wine styles ==
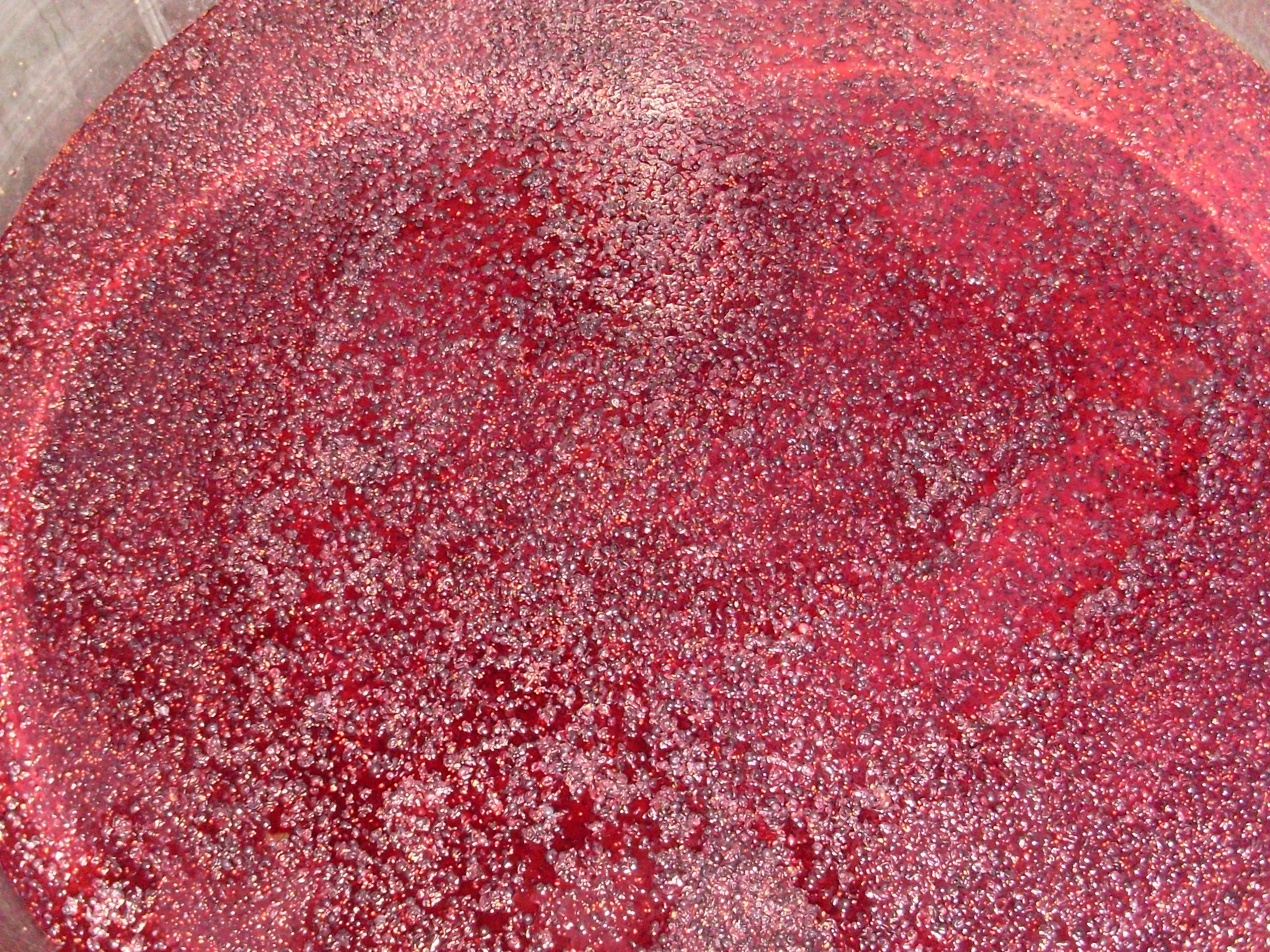
It is through the maceration process (example shown with Pinot noir) that color is leached from the skins into the fermenting must. However, the skins of Poulsard have a very low amount of color pigmentation so even after a week of extended maceration the must usually only has a very pale color.

Though technically a red-skinned noir grape, Poulsard often produces Vin gris either due to low extraction of color compounds or from oxidation of the must that lightens the color even further. While most red skin grape contribute color over a matter of hours to a few days during the maceration process where the skin is kept in contact with the fermenting must, the amount of pigment in Poulsard is so low that even after a week of extended maceration very little color has seeped into the must. It is for this reason that Poulsard is often used in the production of white and lightly colored rosé wines, though officially more than 80% of the harvest in Jura is used for red wine production.

Though Poulsard can be used to produce a varietal wine, it is often blended the grape with other varieties either for enhanced color or to allow the Poulsard to contributes to the aroma of the blend. Among the grapes that Poulsard are often blended with is Trousseau noir, Trousseau gris, and Pinot noir.

== Synonyms ==
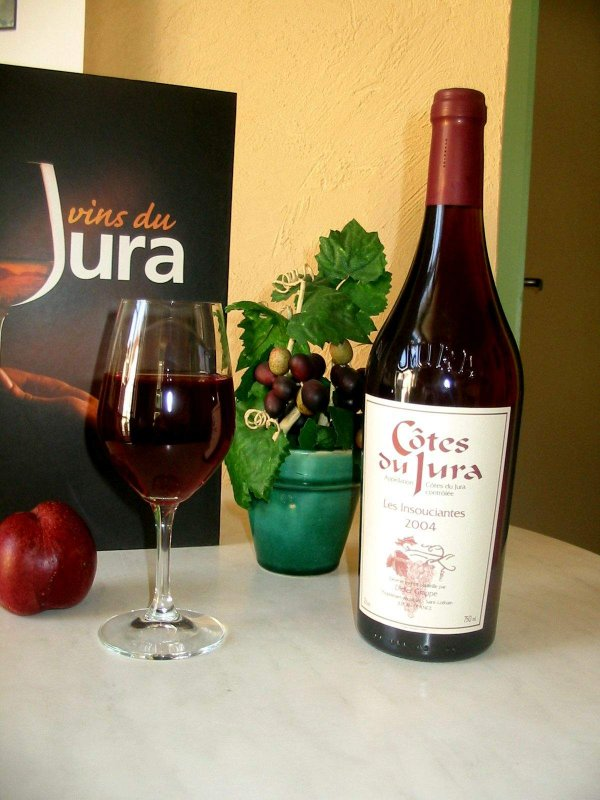
A light red Jura wine made from Poulsard and Trousseau

Poulsard and its wines have been known under a variety of synonyms including Belossard, Blussart, Blussard Blau, Blussard Frueh Blau, Blussard Modry, Cornelle, Drille-de-Coq, Kleinblaettrige Fingertraube, Malvasier Schwarz, Mècle, Mescle, Méthie, Miècle, Olivette, Pandouleau, Pelossard, Peloussard, Pendulot, Plant d'Arbois, Pleusard, Pleusart, Plousard, Ploussard, Plussart, Pulceau, Pulsar, Pulsard, Quille de coq, Raisin Perle and Yurskii Zhemchug.

The white clone version of Poulsard blanc shares many similar synonyms in addition to Blussard weiss, Pelossart, Pulsar Belyi and Quille de Coque.
