= Château-Chalon =

Commune in Bourgogne-Franche-Comté, France

- Commune
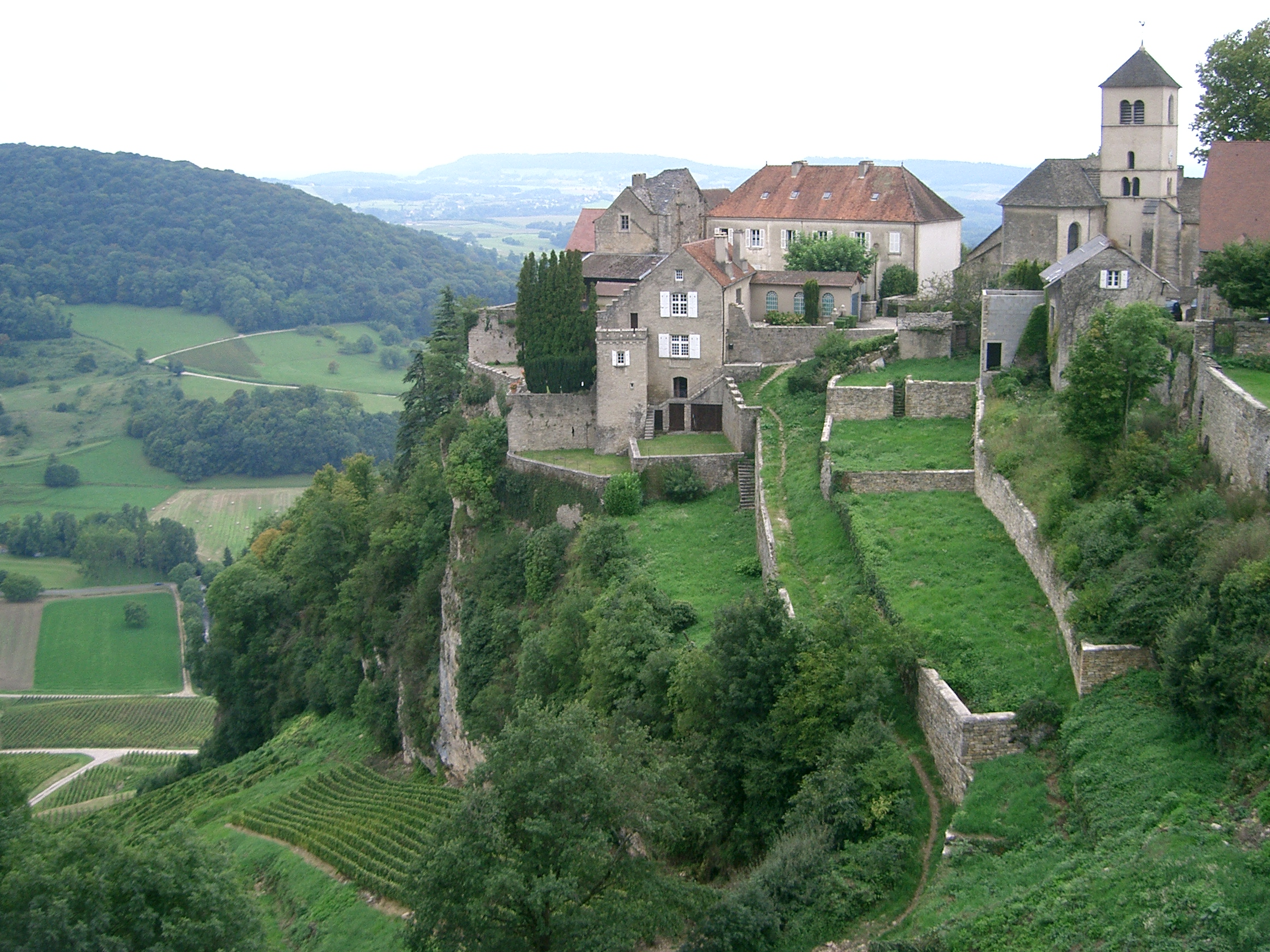
- The Benedictine house in Château-Chalon

- Coat of arms
- Location of Château-Chalon
- Location within France Location within Bourgogne-Franche-Comté
- Coordinates: 46°45′20″N 5°37′36″E
- Country: France
- Region: Bourgogne-Franche-Comté
- Department: Jura
- Arrondissement: Lons-le-Saunier
- Canton: Poligny

Government
  - Mayor (2020–2026): Christian Vuillaume
- Area^{1}: 10.17 km^{2} (3.93 sq mi)
- Highest elevation: 563 m (1,847 ft)
- Lowest elevation: 254 m (833 ft)
- Population (2023): 149
  - Density: 14.7/km^{2} (37.9/sq mi)
- Time zone: UTC+01:00 (CET)
  - Summer (DST): UTC+02:00 (CEST)
- INSEE/Postal code: 39114 /39210
- ^{1} French Land Register data, which excludes lakes, ponds, glaciers > 1 km^{2} (0.386 sq mi or 247 acres) and river estuaries.

Château-Chalon (French pronunciation: [ʃato ʃalɔ̃]; Arpitan: Tsétiâ-Tsalon) is a commune in the Jura department, Bourgogne-Franche-Comté, eastern France.

The commune is perched on a cliff in the first fold of the Jura Mountains. It is reached from the west by a road with numerous hairpin curves. Its location has earned its nomination as one of the Most Beautiful Villages of France.

Although the west side of the village is a sheer cliff, the east side slopes gently away in vineyards known for their wine, including their white wine, Château-Chalon AOC.

== Population ==
Historical population
Year	Pop.	±% p.a.
1968	192	—
1975	160	−2.57%
1982	156	−0.36%
1990	153	−0.24%
1999	160	+0.50%
2007	167	+0.54%
2012	153	−1.74%
2017	146	−0.93%
2023	149	+0.34%
Source: INSEE

== See also ==
- Communes of the Jura department
