= Jura wine =

French wine produced in the Jura département

Coordinates: 46°52′17″N 5°54′48″E

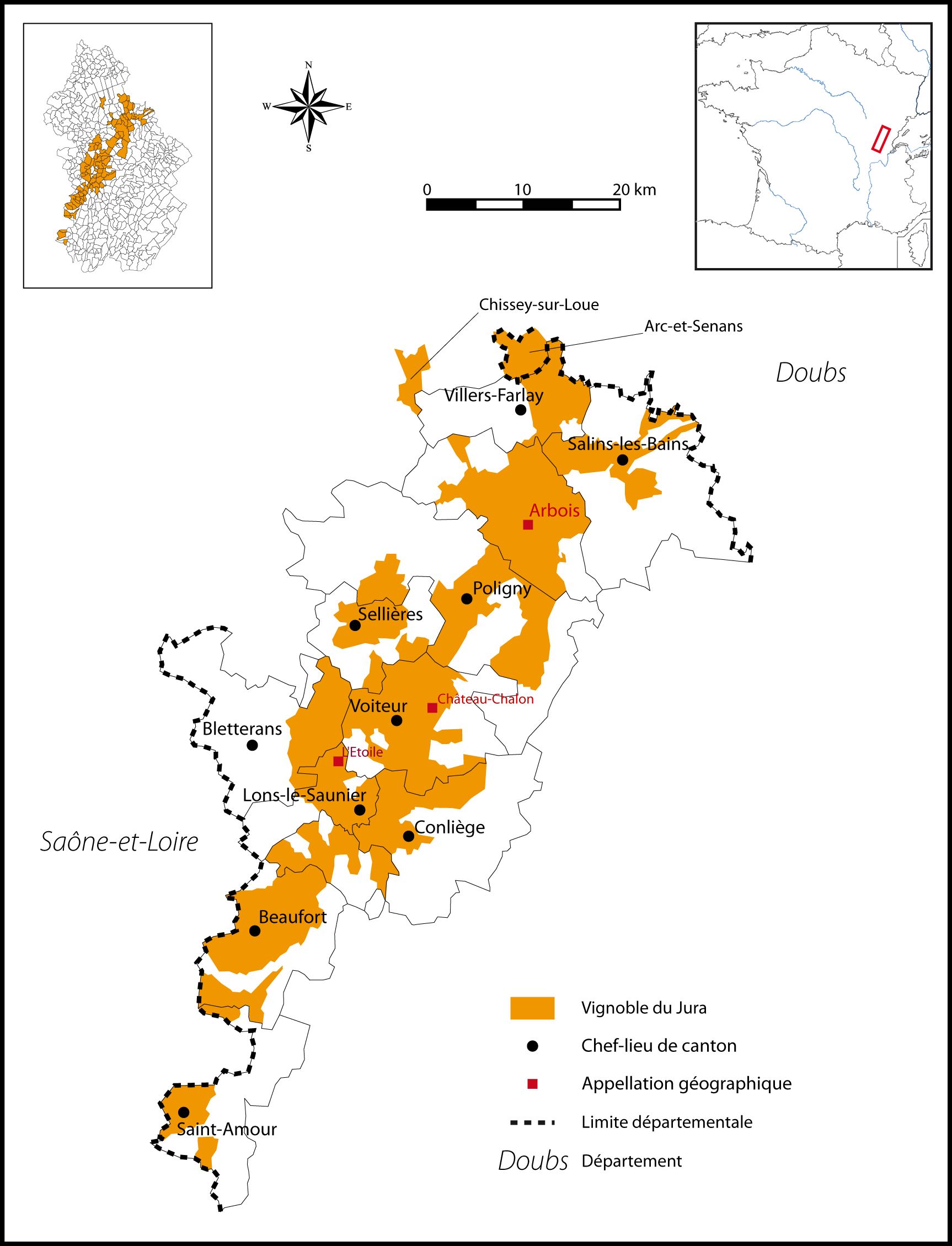
Detailed map of the Jura wine region.

Jura wine is French wine produced in the Jura département. Located between Burgundy and Switzerland, this cool climate wine region produces wines with some similarity to Burgundy and Swiss wine. Jura wines are distinctive and unusual wines, the most famous being vin jaune, which is made by a similar process to Sherry, developing under a flor-like strain of yeast. This is made from the local Savagnin grape variety. Other grape varieties include Poulsard, Trousseau, and Chardonnay. Other wine styles found in Jura includes a vin de paille made from Chardonnay, Poulsard and Savagnin, a sparkling Crémant du Jura made from slightly unripe Chardonnay grapes, and a vin de liqueur known as Macvin du Jura made by adding marc to halt fermentation. The renowned French chemist and biologist Louis Pasteur was born and raised in the Jura region and owned a vineyard near Arbois.

== Climate and geography ==
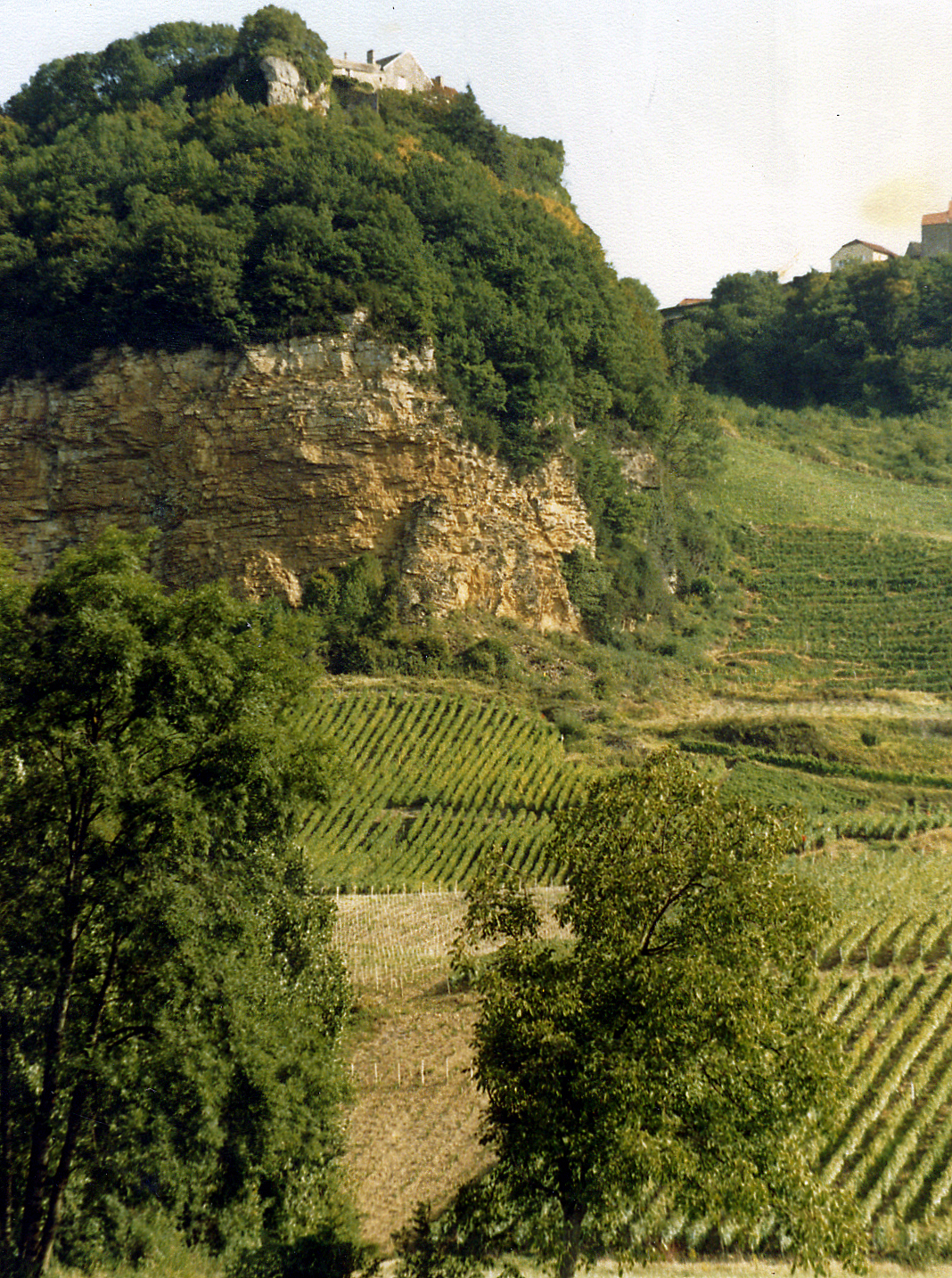
Hillside in Jura with vineyards.

The climate of Jura, one of France’s smallest wine regions, with about 1,950 hectares under vine, around 230 wineries, and annual production of roughly 11 million bottles, is continental with many similarities to Burgundy but can be more aggressively cold, especially in the winter time. Ripeness levels of the grapes is always a concern for winemakers of the area and harvest times are often delayed as long as possible (usually well into late October) to try to achieve the highest sugar levels possible. The 2024 season was reportedly one of Jura’s most difficult in recent history after frost, heavy rain, poor flowering, and persistent downy mildew sharply reduced yields. The 2024 vintage had estimated losses of 60-71% in parts of the region. To help lessen the threat of autumn frost, grapevines are often trained to the Guyot system.

The majority of the region's vineyards are found at elevations of 250–400 metres (800–1,300 feet) between the plains of the Bresse region and the Jura Mountains. Jura was once far larger before phylloxera but remains small today partly because potential vineyard land overlaps with the Comté cheese appellation. The towns of Lons-le-Saunier and Arbois are the principal cities in the wine region. The vineyard soils tend to be composed of mostly clay in the lower flat lands with more limestone based soils in the higher elevation. Deposits of marl are scattered throughout the region with some of the area's most regarded vineyards being found on those sites. Many vineyard slopes are quite steep which creates problems with soil erosion.

== Wine regions ==
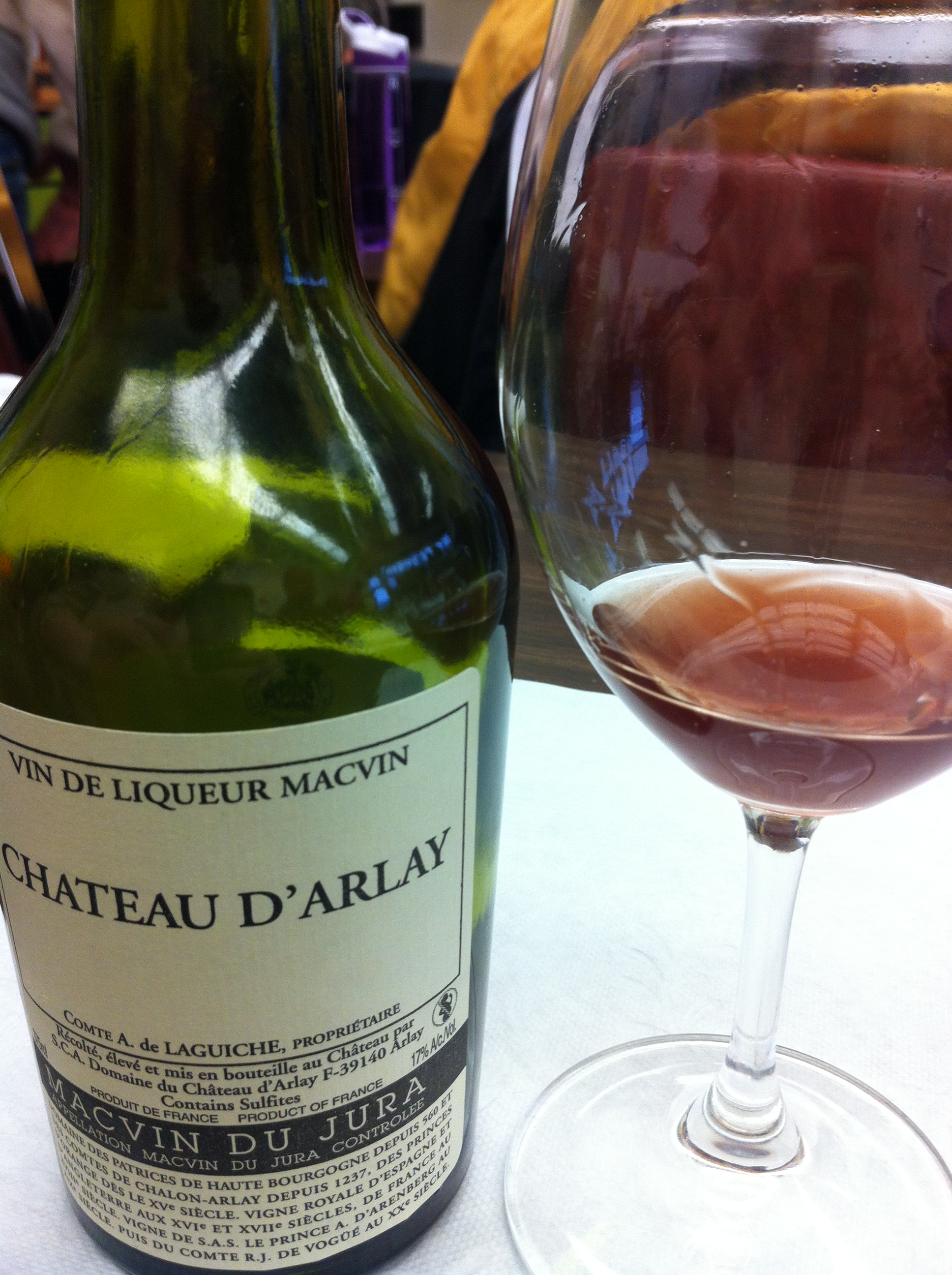
A red Macvin du Jura.

Jura comprises seven AOCs in total, including four geographical appellations and three product AOCs: Macvin, Marc, and Crémant.

- Arbois is an Appellation d'Origine Contrôlée for wines made in the Jura wine region of France, around the town of Arbois. It was the first controlled appellation to be attributed in France, in 1936. Red and rosé wines can be produced from Poulsard (locally stylized to Ploussard), Trousseau, and Pinot noir grapes, and white wines from Chardonnay and Savagnin grapes.
- Château-Chalon AOC is an Appellation d'Origine Contrôlée for wines made around the village of Château-Chalon. Only white wines from the Savagnin grape made in the vin jaune ("yellow wine") style can be made using this appellation. However, the Château-Chalon wines are not explicitly labeled as vin jaune. The wine is known for its longevity, and ability to age for several decades.
- Crémant du Jura is an Appellation d'Origine Contrôlée for sparkling wines. White and rosé sparkling wines can be produced. White wines must be at least 70% Chardonnay, Pinot Noir and Trousseau with the remainder 30% left up to the producer. Rose wines must be at least 50% Pinot Noir, Trousseau or Poulsard. The regions other grape varieties like Savagnin are sometimes blended in as well. Although the AOC only dates to 1995, the production method dates back to the late 1700s. The AOC standard mandates that the grapes be hand-picked, transported in crates with holes that let the grapes oxidise, and the pressing utilizes grape clusters. More recently many organic and biodynamic producers have made high quality brut nature or brut zero expressions made from Chardonnay. Crémant du Jura has been noted as a major category in its own right and an economic driver for the region.
- Côtes du Jura became an Appellation d'Origine Contrôlée in 1937. It produces red and rosé wines from Poulsard, Trousseau, and Pinot noir grapes, and white wines from Chardonnay and Savagnin grapes.
- L'Étoile is an Appellation d'Origine Contrôlée producing wines from Chardonnay, Savagnin, and Poulsard grapes. The wine is produced on 4 communes: L'Étoile, Plainoiseau, Quintigny, and Saint-Didier. (There are two common legends concerning the origin of the name, which means "star". One origin story attributes the name to the five hills that surround the village. The second attributes the name to the small, star-shaped pentacrite fossils that abound in the soil.)
- Macvin du Jura is an Appellation d'Origine Contrôlée producing late harvest vin du Jura fortified with marc du Jura. On 14 November 1991 it received its AOC designation. It is the latest Jurassian AOC, becoming the third vin de liqueur to receive such a designation. Macvin has been in production since the fourteenth century. It is made from five permitted grape varieties, and can be red or rosé when produced from the Poulsard, Trousseau, and Pinot noir, or white when produced from Chardonnay or Savagnin. The grapes are harvested late in season when their sugar content is at its highest. The grape must/juice is allowed to ferment but then Marc du Jura, pomace-based eau-de-vie, is added at a ratio of one litre for every two of must. This halts fermentation, leaving behind residual sugar. Macvin is usually used as an aperitif, but the residual sweetness makes it an excellent dessert wine too.

== Grapes and wine ==
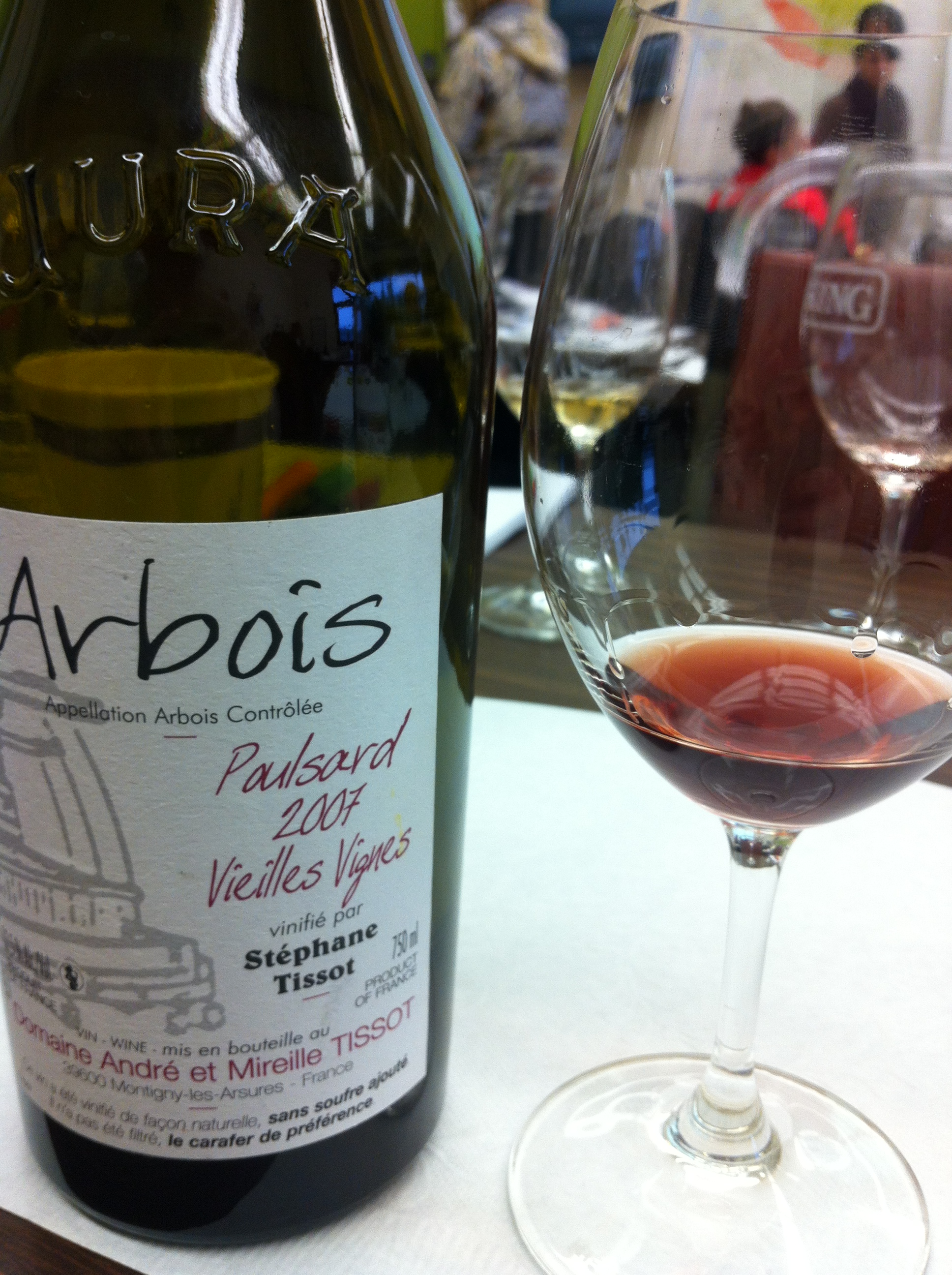
A Poulsard wine from the Arbois AOC.

The main grapes of the region are Chardonnay (known locally as Melon d'Arbois, Melon a Queue Rouge and Gamay Blanc), Savagnin (known locally as Naturé), Poulsard, Pinot noir, and Trousseau. Chardonnay and Pinot noir clippings were brought to the region from Burgundy during the Middle Ages and were used to a limited degree given that there were some 40 other grape varieties prevalent in Jura for most of its winemaking history. Towards the end of the 20th century both grapes began to increase in popularity, with Chardonnay now representing approximately 43% of plantings and Savagnin about 23%, according to regional figures, and is valued for its good sugar levels and early ripening.

Pinot noir is used to make a varietal style of wine or as a blend to deepen the color of the pale Poulsard grape. Pinor noir is reportedly increasingly important in the region’s modern red-wine identity, alongside Trousseau and Poulsard. By itself, Poulsard makes a rosé in the Arbois-Pupillin region that is characterized by an orange corail tint. The Poulsard grape is also one of the primary grapes for the vin de paille. The Trousseau grape performs best in the gravelly vineyards near Arbois that can give the grape the additional heat it needs to ripen into a deep colored, intensely flavored wine. The white Savagnin grape has some similarities with the possibly related Traminer and Gewürztraminer. While the grape is permitted in all styles of white Jura wine throughout the region it is mainly found in vin jaune where it produces a nutty, full bodied wine that can age for an extended period of time. Savagnin is the only variety allowed for a wine to carry the vin jaune name.

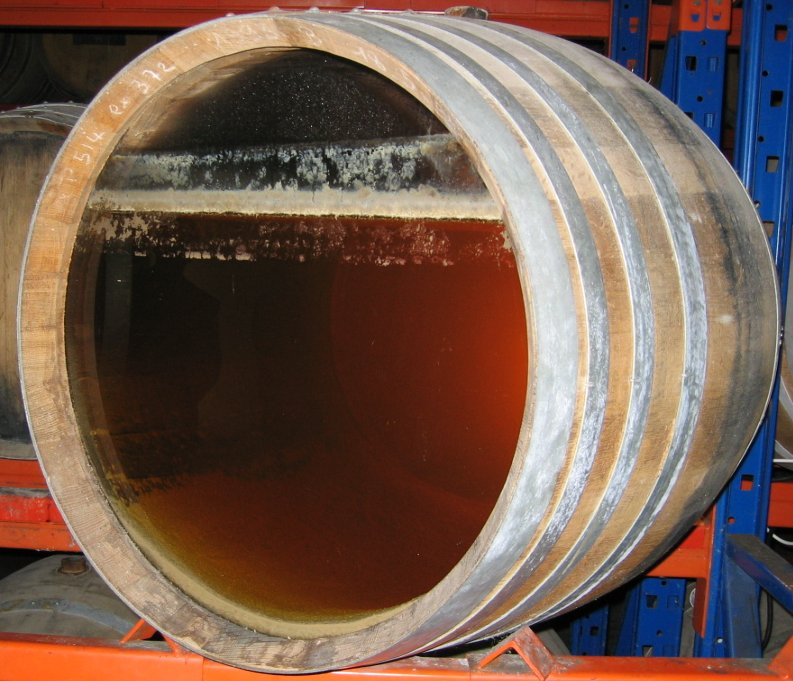
A barrel of vin jaune showing the film of yeast that develops on top and the effects of evaporation.

=== Vin jaune ===
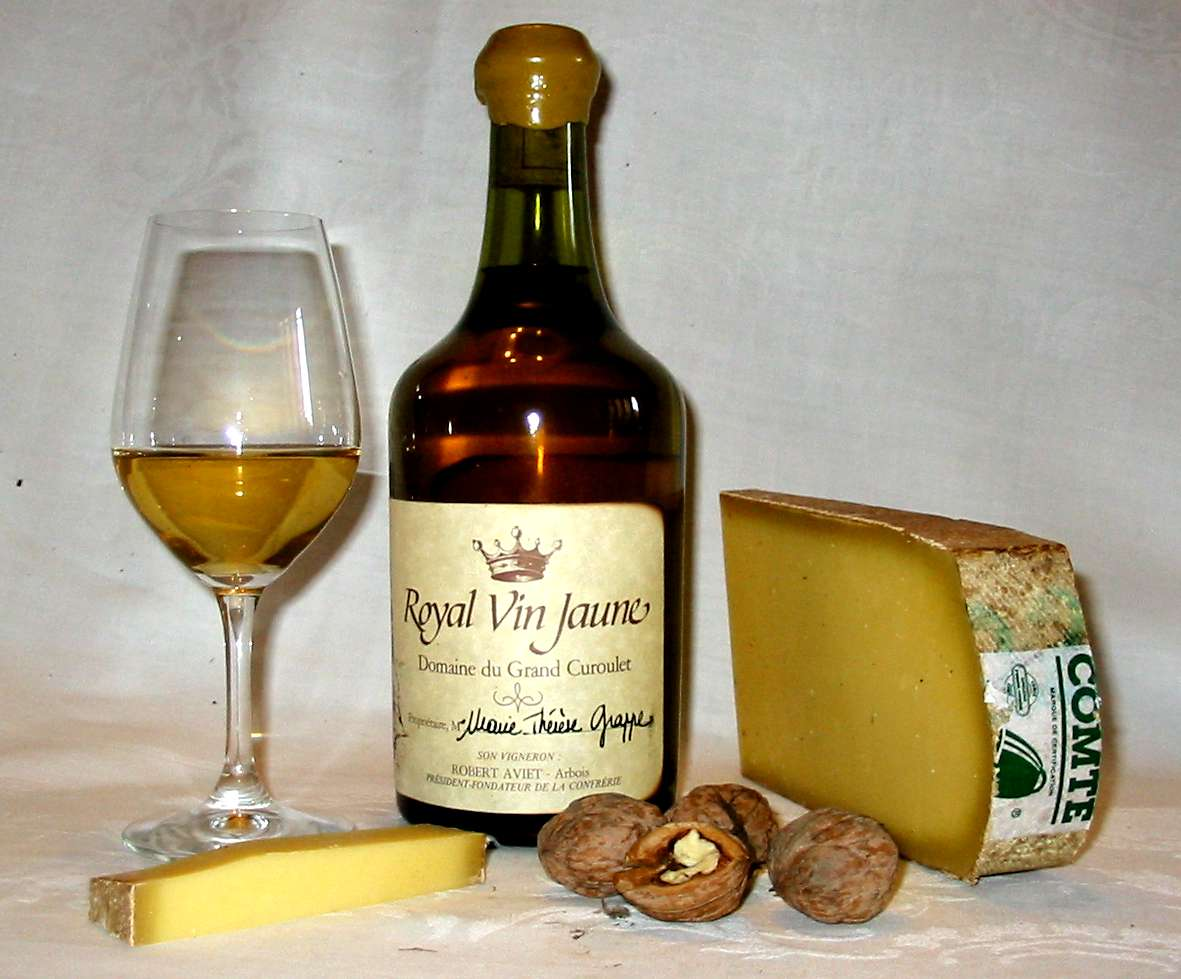
Vin Jaune ("yellow wine") of Jura in a clavelin wine bottle

Jura's most famous and distinguishable wine is vin jaune, which is often likened to sherry. The only permitted grape variety is Savagnin, aged under voile, with only a small share of total Jura production devoted to the style. After fermentation the wine is stored in Burgundian aging barrels for six years and three months before bottling. The barrels are filled up to the top but evaporation reduces the volume of liquid in the barrel and creates an air pocket at the top of the barrel. During this period the wine oxidizes and develops a veil of yeast (voile) often compared with Jerez flor although vin jaune remains distinct from Sherry in its grape varieties, cellar conditions, and the absence of fortification. The wine is then bottled in the signature 62-centilitre clavelin a format commonly explained as reflecting the wine lost to evaporation during its long aging period. Vin jaune is an intensely flavored wine that often requires decanting before drinking.

== Winemaking ==
Due to the cool climate, chaptalization is permitted in the Jura region and is sometimes a necessity to compensate for the low sugar levels in the underripe vintages. Most white wines in the region are aged in oak for several months prior to release, while red wines are often aged in stainless steel tanks and bottled early. Producers in the Jura include Gaspard Feuillet, Chateau Béthanie, Domaine Berthet-Bondet, Frédéric Lornet, and Henri Maire.
