= Vine pull schemes =

Programs for grape growers

Vine pull schemes are programs whereby grape growers receive a financial incentive to pull up their grape vines, a process known as arrachage in French. A large program of this kind was initiated by the European Union (EU) in 1988 to reduce the wine lake glut from overproduction and declining demand. In the first five years of the program, growers, mainly in southern France and southern Italy, were paid to destroy 320,000 hectares or 790,400 acres (3,199 km^{2}) of vineyard. This was the equivalent to the entire vineyard area of the world's fourth largest grower of grapes, the United States. The EU has recently resumed a vine pull scheme and Plan Bordeaux proposes additional vine pulls to increase prices for generic Bordeaux wine.

It is believed that this has contributed to the "global wine shortage". Research by the American financial services firm Morgan Stanley says demand for wine "exceeded supply by 300m cases in 2012".
