= Abergement-le-Petit =

Commune in Bourgogne-Franche-Comté, France

- Commune
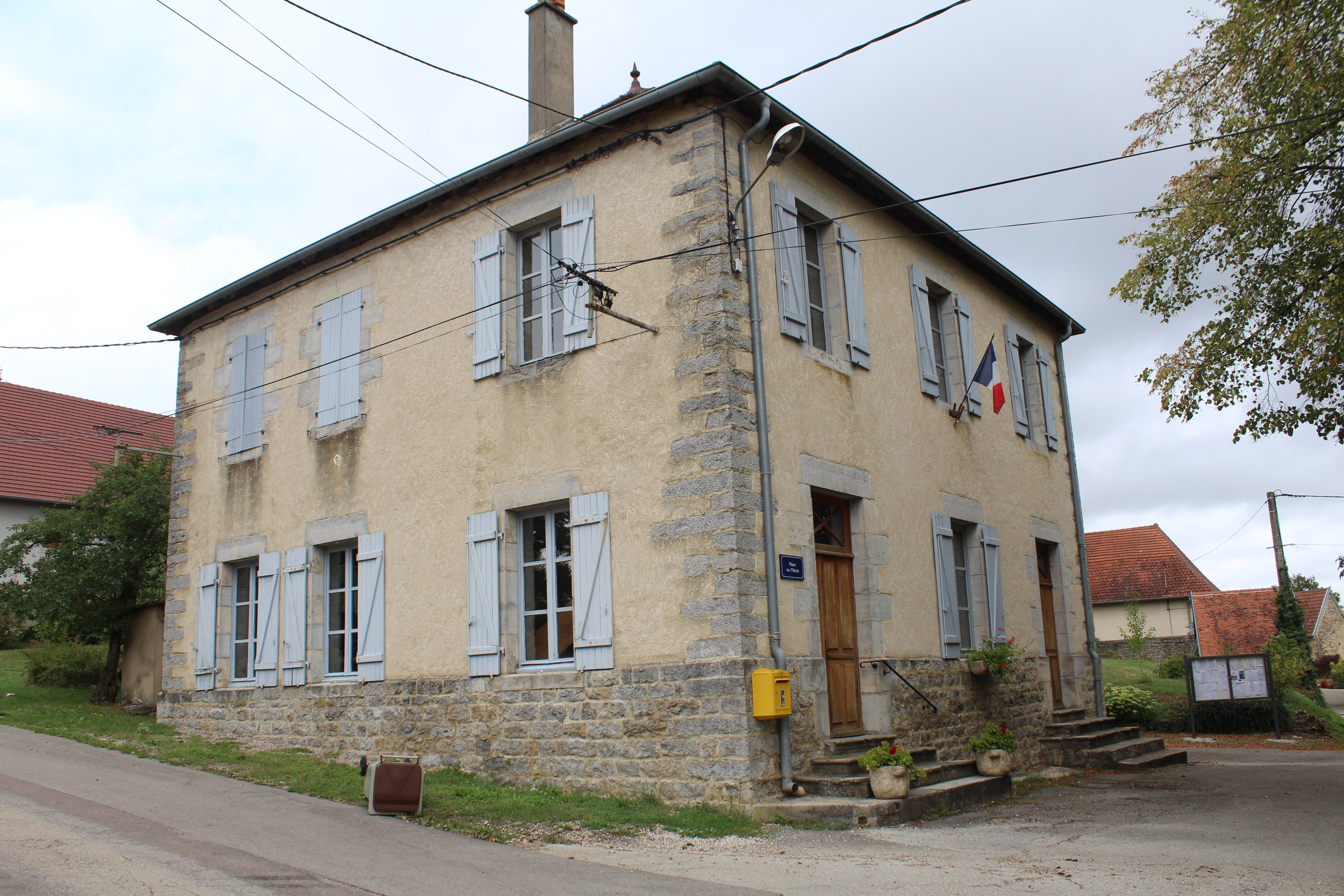
- The town hall in Abergement-le-Petit
- Location of Abergement-le-Petit
- Location within France Location within Bourgogne-Franche-Comté
- Coordinates: 46°54′12″N 5°41′47″E
- Country: France
- Region: Bourgogne-Franche-Comté
- Department: Jura
- Arrondissement: Lons-le-Saunier
- Canton: Bletterans
- Intercommunality: Arbois, Poligny, Salins – Cœur du Jura

Government
  - Mayor (2020–2026): André Vionnet
- Area^{1}: 1.52 km^{2} (0.59 sq mi)
- Highest elevation: 290 m (950 ft)
- Lowest elevation: 250 m (820 ft)
- Population (2023): 46
  - Density: 30/km^{2} (78/sq mi)
- Demonym(s): Abergementiers, Abergementières
- Time zone: UTC+01:00 (CET)
  - Summer (DST): UTC+02:00 (CEST)
- INSEE/Postal code: 39003 /39800
- ^{1} French Land Register data, which excludes lakes, ponds, glaciers > 1 km^{2} (0.386 sq mi or 247 acres) and river estuaries.

Abergement-le-Petit is a commune in the Jura department in the region of Bourgogne-Franche-Comté in eastern France.

== Population ==
Historical population

Year	Pop.	±% p.a.
1793	160	—
1821	197	+0.75%
1846	154	−0.98%
1872	113	−1.18%
1901	92	−0.71%
1926	65	−1.38%
1946	53	−1.02%
1962	51	−0.24%
1968	46	−1.71%

Year	Pop.	±% p.a.
1975	38	−2.69%
1982	32	−2.43%
1990	39	+2.50%
1999	43	+1.09%
2007	40	−0.90%
2012	38	−1.02%
2017	42	+2.02%
2023	46	+1.53%

Source: EHESS (1793-1999) and INSEE

== See also ==
- Communes of the Jura department
